= Umeå Centre for Global Health Research =

Swedish centre for excellence

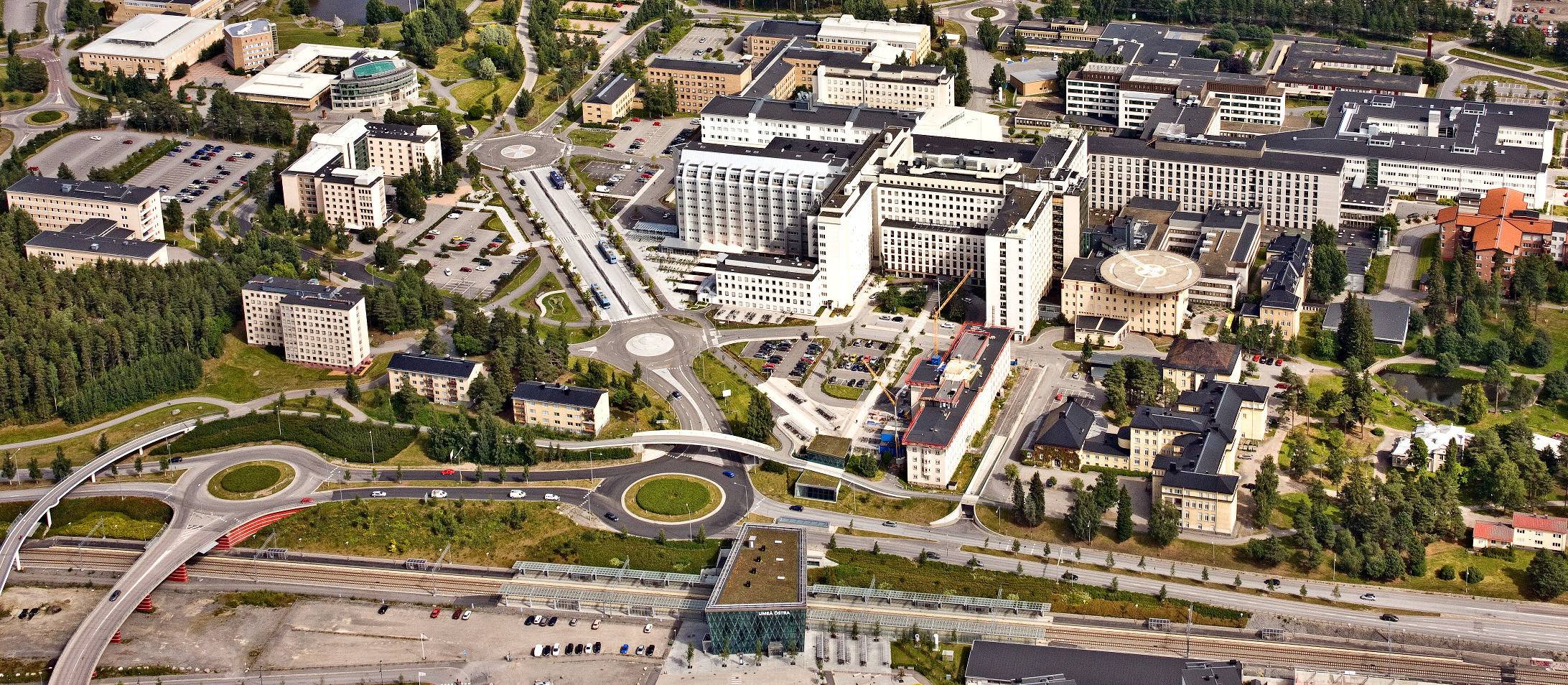
- UCGHR:s premises at Norrland University Hospital
- Abbreviation: UCGHR
- Formation: 2007; 19 years ago
- Type: research institute
- Headquarters: Umeå, Sweden
- Location: Norrland University Hospital
- Official language: English, Swedish
- Director: Peter Byass
- Main organ: Department of Epidemiology and Global Health
- Parent organization: Umeå University
- Affiliations: The International Network for the Demographic Evaluation of Populations and Their Health (INDEPTH)

The Umeå Centre for Global Health Research (UCGHR) was a centre of excellence within Umeå University in northern Sweden. The centre operated within the university's Department of Epidemiology and Global Health, and was led by a steering group chaired by a principal investigator.

UCGHR sought to engage with a global agenda on health research and practice, addressing critical issues in global health and facilitating collaboration between and within the North and South. The centre's long-term research programme has been developed against a background of international epidemiological research, as well as public health work within Sweden.

The centre was responsible for publishing the open-access academic journal Global Health Action.

== Research ==
Research conducted within UCGHR was interdisciplinary in nature, with staff and students working together from backgrounds in demography, public health sciences, epidemiology, medicine, economics, statistics and sociology. Research activities were clustered around five areas of expertise:

- The epidemiological transition – research aims to contribute to theoretical and methodological development of the epidemiological transition theory by contrasting disadvantaged communities in low-income countries to the well-developed setting of northern Sweden.
- A life course perspective on health interventions – research aims to design and evaluate health interventions targeting different stages of the life course, from the unborn child to old age, taking into account social context and gender aspects, and both advantaged and disadvantaged communities.
- Strengthening primary health care: the roles of rights, ethics and economic analyses – research is designed to inform key stakeholders involved in decision-making to strengthen primary health care in low-, middle- and high-income countries, using rights-based approaches integrated with economic analyses.
- Gender, social inequality and health – research is based on the generation of new knowledge on gender and health, with the aim of contributing to social changes within populations and in health systems.
- Climate change and health – research is intended to fill the knowledge gap regarding links between climate change and health, with a focus on non-communicable diseases, ageing populations, health sector responses in low-income countries and issues particular to the Arctic region.

Many of UCGHR's research projects were linked to INDEPTH (the International Network for the Demographic Evaluation of Populations and Their Health), a network of field sites in countries across Africa, Asia and South America. This network provides a platform to share and exchange vital health data between some of the world's poorest countries and enables comparative studies of global research questions related to disease development, urbanisation and migration as well as opportunities to develop methods and evaluate interventions.

== Education ==
Research training was essential to UCGHR. The Swedish Research School for Global Health was the result of a partnership between the centre and the Karolinska Institute, Stockholm. The school seeks to achieve multidisciplinary collaboration in education, research and training by coordinating courses and seminars in global health, and improving the quality of research training.
