= Mathias Dahlgren =

Swedish chef

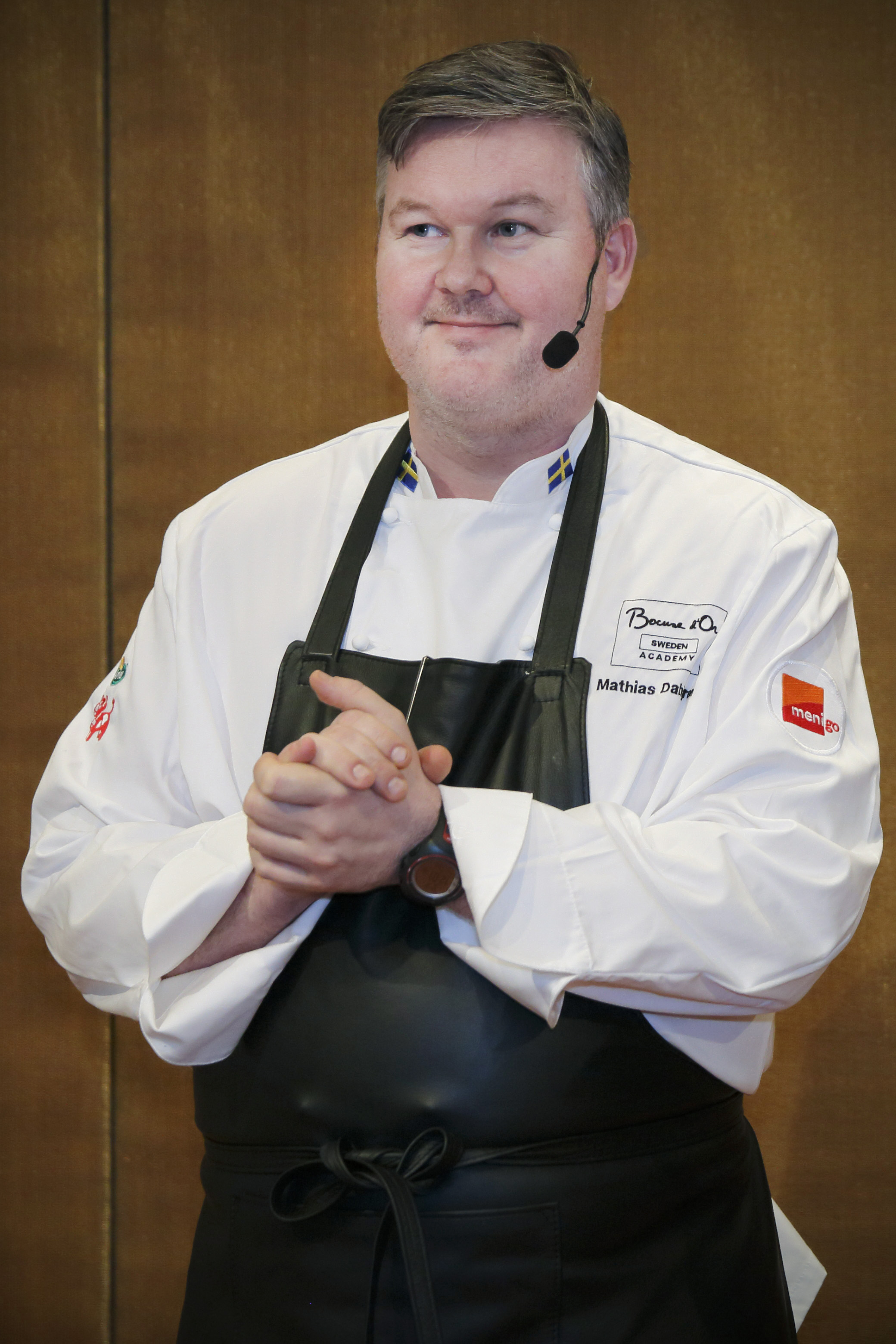
Mathias Dahlgren in 2014.

Mathias Dahlgren (born 10 March 1969 in Umeå) is a Swedish chef, who won the culinary championship Bocuse d'Or in 1997.

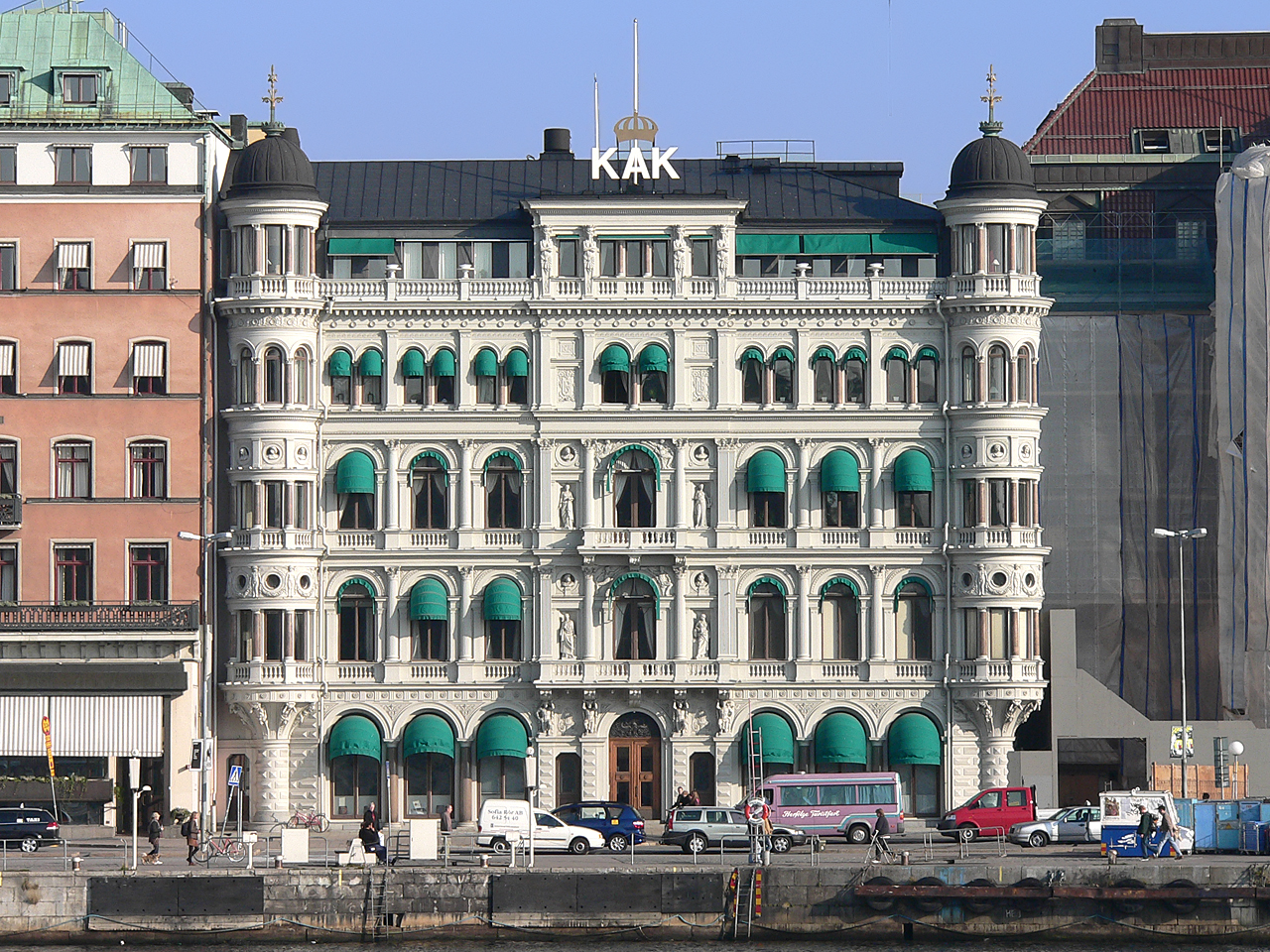
Restaurant Mathias Dahlgren

Four times selected the Swedish Chef of the Year, Dahlgren ran the Stockholm restaurant Bon Lloc, which had one Michelin star, from 1996 to 2005. In 2007, he opened the restaurant Mathias Dahlgren in the Stockholm Grand Hôtel, which received a Michelin star in 2008. Since 2008, Mathias Dahlgren has also been connected to the Umeå University School of Restaurant and Culinary Arts as an adjunct professor. In 2009, it was upgraded to two Michelin stars, only the second Swedish restaurant ever (the first one being Edsbacka krog) to receive this recognition. The side restaurant Matbaren in the same building was simultaneously elevated to one Michelin star status. Also he is placed as a newcomer (2009) on place 50 among the best restaurants in the world.

Since 2008, Mathias Dahlgren is an associate professor with the Umeå University School of Restaurant and Culinary Arts.

Dahlgren has, among other things, written the books Mathias Dahlgren kokbok (Prisma 2001), Bon Lloc with Ingar Nilsson (Prisma 2003) and Det naturliga köket with Jens Linder (Nordstedts 2010).

== Personal life ==
He grew up in the village of Storliden, two miles north of Umeå in Västerbotten. Until 2012, he was married to Anna, who also worked closely with him for many years. He is the older brother of the journalist Erica Dahlgren.
