= Bildmuseet =

Contemporary art museum in Sweden

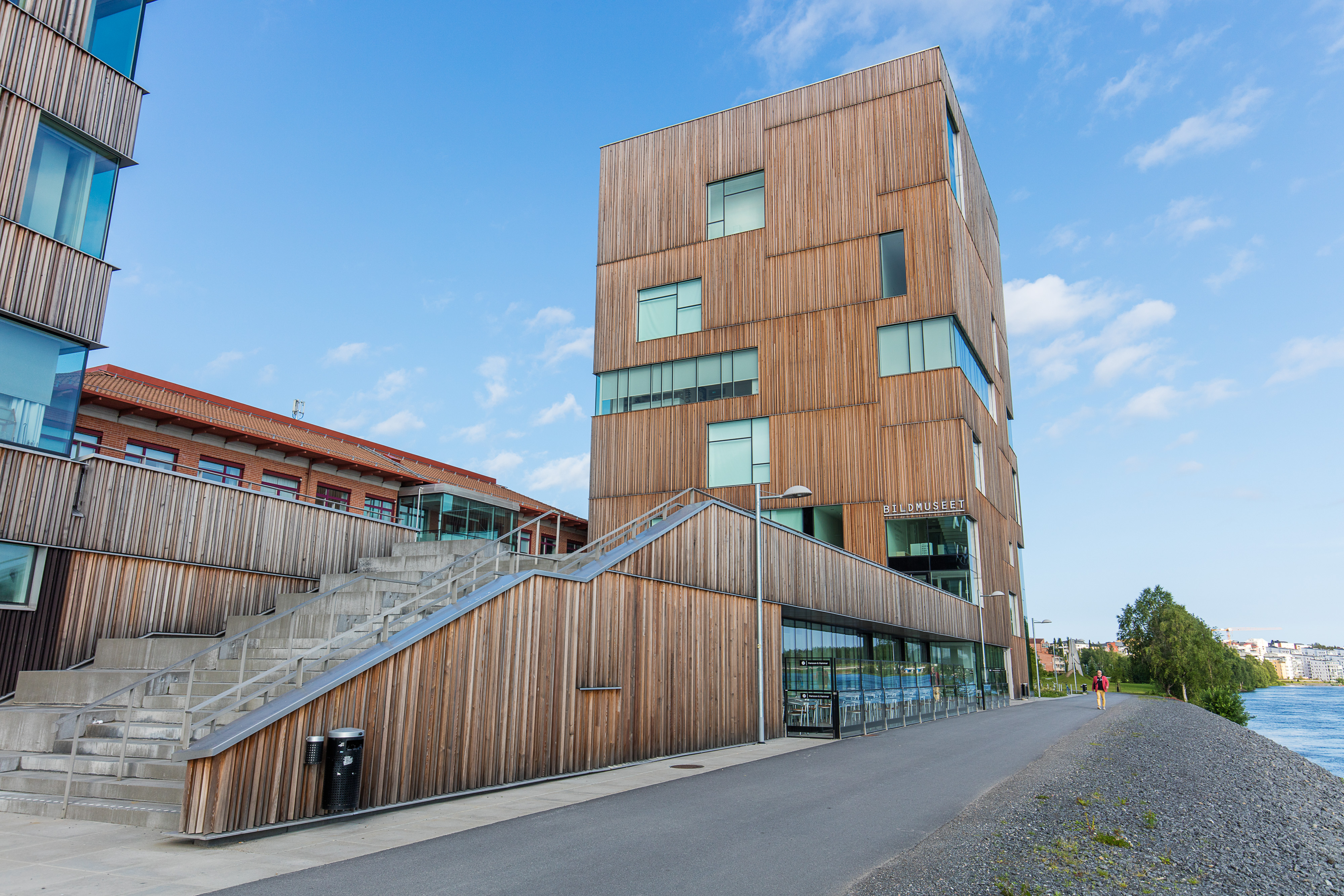
- Bildmuseet at Umeå Arts Campus

General information
- Architectural style: Neomodern
- Location: Umeå Arts Campus
- Town or city: Umeå
- Country: Sweden
- Coordinates: 63°49′42″N 20°17′27″E
- Opened: 1981
- Relocated: 2012
- Owner: Umeå University

Design and construction
- Architect(s): Henning Larsen Architects and White Architects

Website
- www.bildmuseet.umu.se/en

Bildmuseet (English: Museum of Visual Arts) is a contemporary art museum in Umeå, northern Sweden.

== History ==
The museum was founded in 1981 by Umeå University and it exhibits Swedish and international contemporary art, visual culture, design, and architecture, sometimes along with historical art retrospectives. In conjunction with the exhibitions program it also arranges lectures, screenings, concerts, performances, and workshops. The exhibitions include internationally renowned artists, filmmakers, photographers, and designers, such as for example Walid Raad, Zineb Sedira, Tracey Rose, Mario Merz, Dayanita Singh, Agnès Varda, Felice Varini, Joan Jonas, Isaac Julien, Stan Douglas, Leonor Fini, Rafel Lozano-Hemmer, Julio Le Parc, John Akomfrah, Charles och Ray Eames, Jumana Emil Abboud, Ana Mendieta, and Faith Ringgold.

In spring 2012, the museum moved into new premises on the Umeå Arts Campus. The new Bildmuseet, hosted in a seven-storey building (Architecture: Henning Larsen Architects) opened to the public May 19, 2012.

== Honours ==
In 2013, Bildmuseet was nominated fly the European Museum Forum as one of three museums for the European Council's prize The Council of Europe Museum Prize 2014. Late 2017 the British newspaper The Telegraph listed Bildmuseet as one of "42 incredible museums to visit in your lifetime".

== The building ==
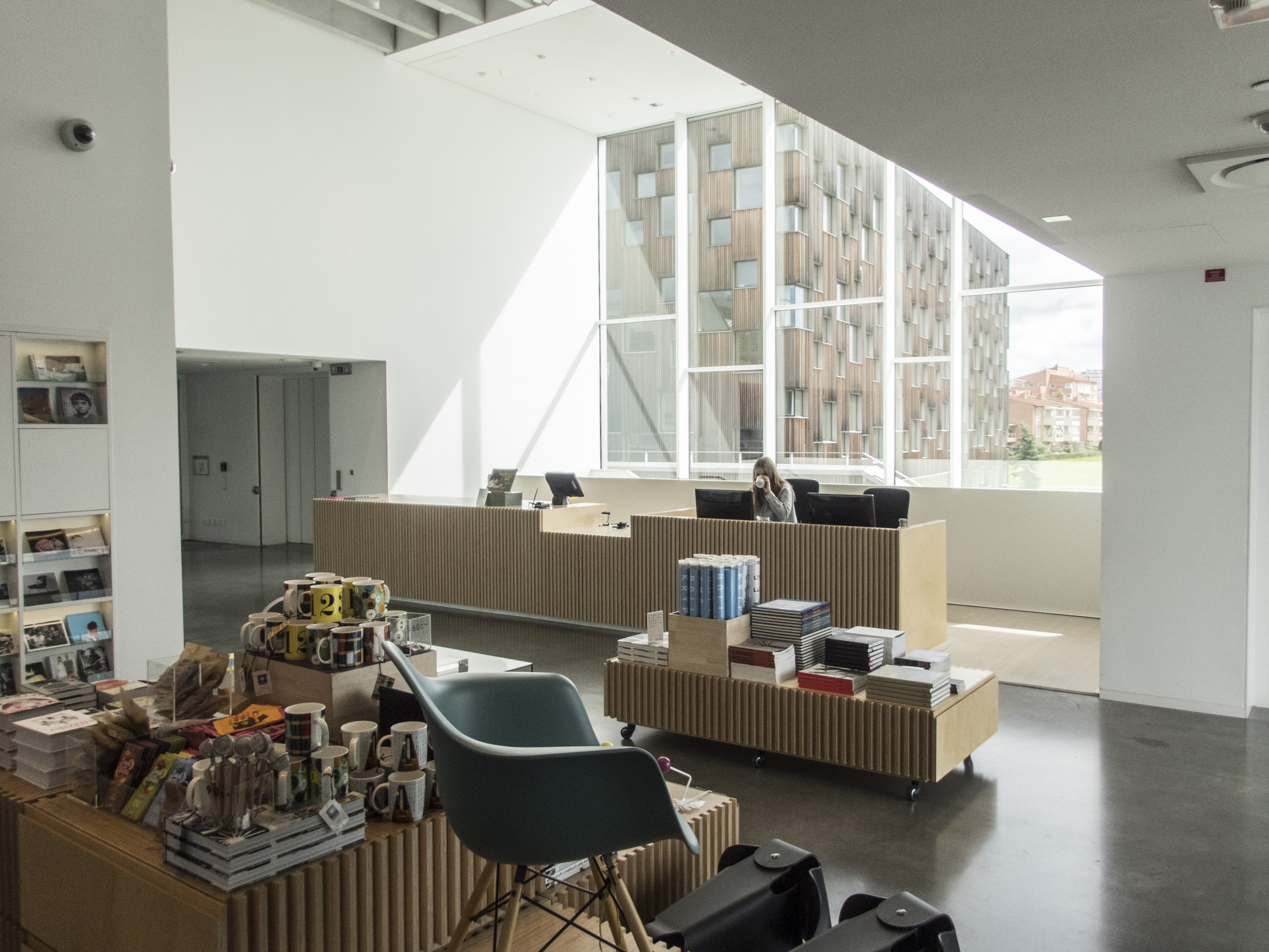
Interior

The outside of the building is covered in randomly spaced windows and a larch facing that will fade to grey in time. Within the building is decorated in white with windows that look out over the Ume riverside.
