= Norrback =

Norrback is a surname. Notable people with the surname include:

- Anders Norrback (born 1963), Finnish politician
- Arne Norrback (born 1937), Swedish weightlifter
- Karl-Fredrik Norrback (born 1972), Swedish physician
- Ole Norrback (born 1941), Finnish politician and diplomat
