= Adaptive capacity =

Social and ecological concept

Adaptive capacity relates to the capacity of systems, institutions, humans and other organisms to adjust to potential damage, to take advantage of opportunities, or to respond to consequences. In the context of ecosystems, adaptive capacity is the ability to maintain, recover, or adapt performance and function as climate conditions change. Species' adaptive capacity is generally characterized by phenotypic plasticity, dispersal ability, and genetic diversity, which are foundational to the species' ability to acclimate in situ or track suitable climate across the landscape. In the context of coupled socio-ecological social systems, adaptive capacity is commonly associated with the following characteristics: Firstly, the ability of institutions and networks to learn, and store knowledge and experience. Secondly, the creative flexibility in decision making, transitioning and problem solving. And thirdly, the existence of power structures that are responsive and consider the needs of all stakeholders.

In the context of climate change adaptation, adaptive capacity depends on the inter-relationship of social, political, economic, technological and institutional factors operating at a variety of scales. Some of these are generic, and others are exposure-specific.

== Benefits ==
Adaptive capacity confers resilience to perturbation, giving ecological and human social systems the ability to reconfigure themselves with minimum loss of function. In ecological systems, this resilience shows as net primary productivity and maintenance of biomass and biodiversity, and the stability of hydrological cycles. In human social systems it is demonstrated by the stability of social relations, the maintenance of social capital and economic prosperity.

Building adaptive capacity is particular important in the context of climate change, where it refers to a latent capacity - in terms of resources and assets - from which adaptations can be made as required depending on future circumstances. Since future climate is likely to be different from the present climate, developing adaptive capacity is a prerequisite for the adaptation that can reduce the potential negative effects of exposure to climate change. In climate change, adaptive capacity, along with hazard, exposure and vulnerability, is a key component that contributes to risk, or the potential for harm or impact.

== Characteristics ==
Adaptive capacity can be enhanced in a number of different ways. A report by the Overseas Development Institute introduces the local adaptive capacity framework (LAC), featuring five core characteristics of adaptive capacity. These include:

- Asset base: the availability of a diverse range of key livelihood assets that allow households or communities to respond to evolving circumstances
- Institutions and entitlements: the existence of an appropriate and evolving institutional environment that allows for access and entitlement to key assets and capitals
- Knowledge and information: the ability households and communities have to generate, receive, assess and disseminate knowledge and information in support of appropriate adaptation options
- Innovation: the system creates an enabling environment to foster innovation, experimentation and the ability to explore niche solutions in order to take advantage of new opportunities
- Flexible forward-looking decision-making and governance: the system is able to anticipate, incorporate and respond to changes with regards to its governance structures and future planning.

Many development interventions - such as social protection programmes and efforts to promote social safety nets - can play important roles in promoting aspects of adaptive capacity.

== Relationship between adaptive capacity, states and strategies ==
Adaptive capacity is associated with r and K selection strategies in ecology and with a movement from explosive positive feedback to sustainable negative feedback loops in social systems and technologies. The Resilience Alliance shows how the logistic curve of the r phase positive feedback, becoming replaced by the K negative feedback strategy is an important part of adaptive capacity. The r strategy is associated with situations of low complexity, high resilience, and growing potential. K strategies are associated with situations of high complexity, high potential and high resilience, but if the perturbations exceed certain limits, adaptive capacity may be exceeded and the system collapses into another so-called Omega state, of low potential, low complexity and low resilience.

== In the context of climate change ==
Adaptive capacity in the context of climate change covers human, natural, or managed systems. It looks at how they respond to both climate variability and extremes. It covers the ability of a system to adjust to climate change to moderate potential damages, to take advantage of opportunities, or to cope with consequences. Adaptive capacity is the ability to reduce the likelihood of negative impacts of climate-related hazards. It does this through the ability to design and implement effective adaptation strategies, or to react to evolving hazards and stresses.

== Common enablers of adaptive capacity ==
An enabler, also known as a promoter or driver, represents a set of factors and conditions which can help to build and develop resilience. In a 2001 IPCC report focusing on impacts, adaptation, and vulnerability, six factors were identified as promoters of adaptive capacity. These characteristics contribute to the development and strengthening of adaptive capacity. For instance, a stable and prosperous economy is crucial, as it enables better management of the costs associated with adaptation. Generally, developed and wealthier nations are more prepared to face the impacts of climate change. Access to technology at various levels (local, regional, and national) and in all sectors is essential for staying informed about resource distribution, land use, and extraction practices. Additionally, clearly delineating roles and responsibilities for executing adaptation strategies is important at national, regional, and local levels. Discussion forums and consultations are established to disseminate climate information, ensuring clear communication and collaboration. Social institutions aim to distribute resources equitably, recognizing that power imbalances can hinder adaptive capacity. It's vital to protect existing systems with high adaptive capacity, such as traditional societies, from potential compromises resulting from modern development trajectories.

== Common barriers of adaptive capacity ==
A barrier is an obstacle surmounted through collective efforts, creative management, mindset shifts, and adjustments in resource distribution, land uses, and institutions. Barriers are often confused with limits however, the distinguishing feature between the two is that limits cannot be overcome. Barriers are crucial to consider when assessing the level of adaptive capacity within a group, community, and organization, as they block or hinder adaptation actions. Various types of barriers including historical, political, financial, and natural can be identified. They can be either internal or external and can block or hinder the implementation of an adaptation action and consequently lower adaptive capacity. An external barrier is a factor that falls outside an organization/community/individual's control. For example, a common external barrier is the absence of land available for individuals or enterprises to relocate while faced with a major climatic event such as flooding or wildfires. An internal barrier is typically affected by an organization/community/individual beliefs and perceptions concerning climate change. For example, a common internal barrier is people's reluctance to relocate from flood-prone regions (owing to their livelihood dependence), the costs of land or property, or insufficient awareness regarding the potential flooding risks amid projected climate alterations.

Common organizational barriers include a disconnect between government recommendations/policies and concrete actions made by actors and organizations. Scholars point to other significant barriers that may impede adaptation action, like the lack of resources, financial incentives for long-term planning, and a lack of knowledge related to climate change adaptation. Another common barrier is skepticism regarding the severity and urgency of climate impacts. Local knowledge of technical, climate-adapted solutions is instrumental for organizational adaptation, but opportunities to harness this knowledge can be missed due to skeptical beliefs.

== Darwinian natural selection ==
The evolutionary emergence of living systems likely included early replication of an RNA molecule, as described in the article RNA world. Such an emerging RNA molecule may have been capable of the three mechanisms of Darwinian selection: heritability, variation of type, and differential reproductive output. The fitness of such an RNA replicator (its per capita rate of increase) likely would have been a function of its intrinsic adaptive capacities determined by its nucleotide sequence, and the availability of resources. The three primary adaptive capacities may have been: (1) replication with moderate fidelity, giving rise to heritability while allowing variation of type, (2) resistance to decay, and (3) acquisition of, and ability to process, resources. These adaptive capacities would have functioned by means of the folded configurations of the RNA replicators determined by their nucleotide sequences.

== See also ==
- Adaptability
