= Molecular Infection Medicine Sweden =

Swedish infection biology research institute

The Laboratory for Molecular Infection Medicine Sweden (MIMS)
- Established: 2007
- Director: Oliver Billker
- Location: Umeå
- Website: www.umu.se/mims/

The Laboratory for Molecular Infection Medicine Sweden (MIMS) at Umeå University was established in 2007 as a joint venture between the European Molecular Biology Laboratory (EMBL) and the Nordic EMBL Partnership for Molecular Medicine, Heidelberg. Additional partners in the Nordic region are the Institute for Molecular Medicine Finland (FIMM) at the University of Helsinki and the Centre for Molecular Medicine Norway (NCMM) at the University of Oslo. The Danish Research Institute of Translational Neuroscience (DANDRITE) at the Aarhus University has also joined the collaboration.

MIMS at Umeå University is a part of the Umeå Centre for Microbial Research (UCMR), which also includes researchers in molecular biology and clinical microbiology, chemistry and physics, and is closely connected to the University Hospital of Umeå (NUS). Since 2014 MIMS coordinates the National Doctoral Programme in Infections and Antibiotics (NDPIA), funded by the Swedish Research Council (Vetenskapsrådet).

Founding director of MIMS is Bernt Eric Uhlin, professor of molecular infection medicine and award-winner of the Göran Gustafsson Prize in Molecular Biology 1995. He was also awarded the Umeå University’s Medal of Honour in 2015, the highest distinction that is awarded to an individual at the university. Bernt Eric Uhlin is awarded the medal for his outstanding contribution to the university and the development of the strong research environment within infection biology and molecular infection medicine. Oliver Billker, a distinguished expert in malaria parasite genomics, was appointed as new director of MIMS in October 2018 and succeeded Bernt Eric Uhlin.

Among the approximately 15 researcher groups, one stands out in particular: the award winner of the Göran Gustafsson Prize 2014 in Molecular Biology Emmanuelle Charpentier’s group, which has studied “Molecular mechanisms governing Gram-positive bacterial pathogenesis” and was the driving force behind the discovery of the mechanisms behind the CRISPR-Cas9 system.
