= Umeå University Library =

Library of Umeå University

Coordinates: 63°49′17.9″N 20°18′22.3″E

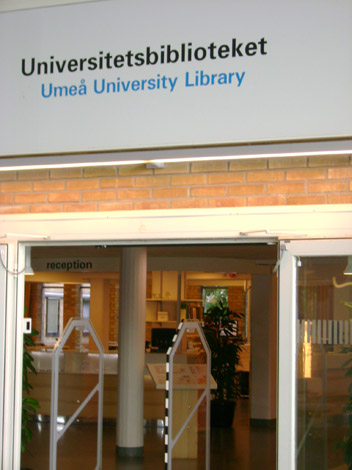
- Umeå University Library entrance from Lindellhallen
- Location: Umeå, Sweden
- Established: 1950

Collection
- Size: 1.5 million volumes
- Legal deposit: YES

Access and use
- Population served: Northern Sweden

Other information
- Website: About the Library

Umeå University Library is one of the seven libraries in Sweden that by law is directly supplied by printers in Sweden with one copy of every book printed ("pliktbibliotek").

== History ==
The University Library originates from the Scientific Library in Umeå (Vetenskapliga biblioteket i Umeå) established in 1950 at Umeå City Library. In 1951 the library was recognised as important for northern Sweden. The library is given a copy of every new book printed in Sweden. It gradually expanded to supply services for research and for university education. It was reorganized as a university library at the time of the foundation of Umeå University in 1965. A new main library building on the university campus was inaugurated in 1968. It has since been extended, most recently in 2006.

There are subsidiary libraries at the Norrland's University Hospital and at the Umeå Arts Campus.

The University Library has over the years received several donations, among others from the historian Nils Ahnlund, language professor Björn Collinder, political economist Eli Heckscher and journalist/writer Sigrid Kahle. The Library's Archives and Special Collections unit also host the archives of writer Sara Lidman.

== See also ==
- List of libraries in Sweden

== Images ==
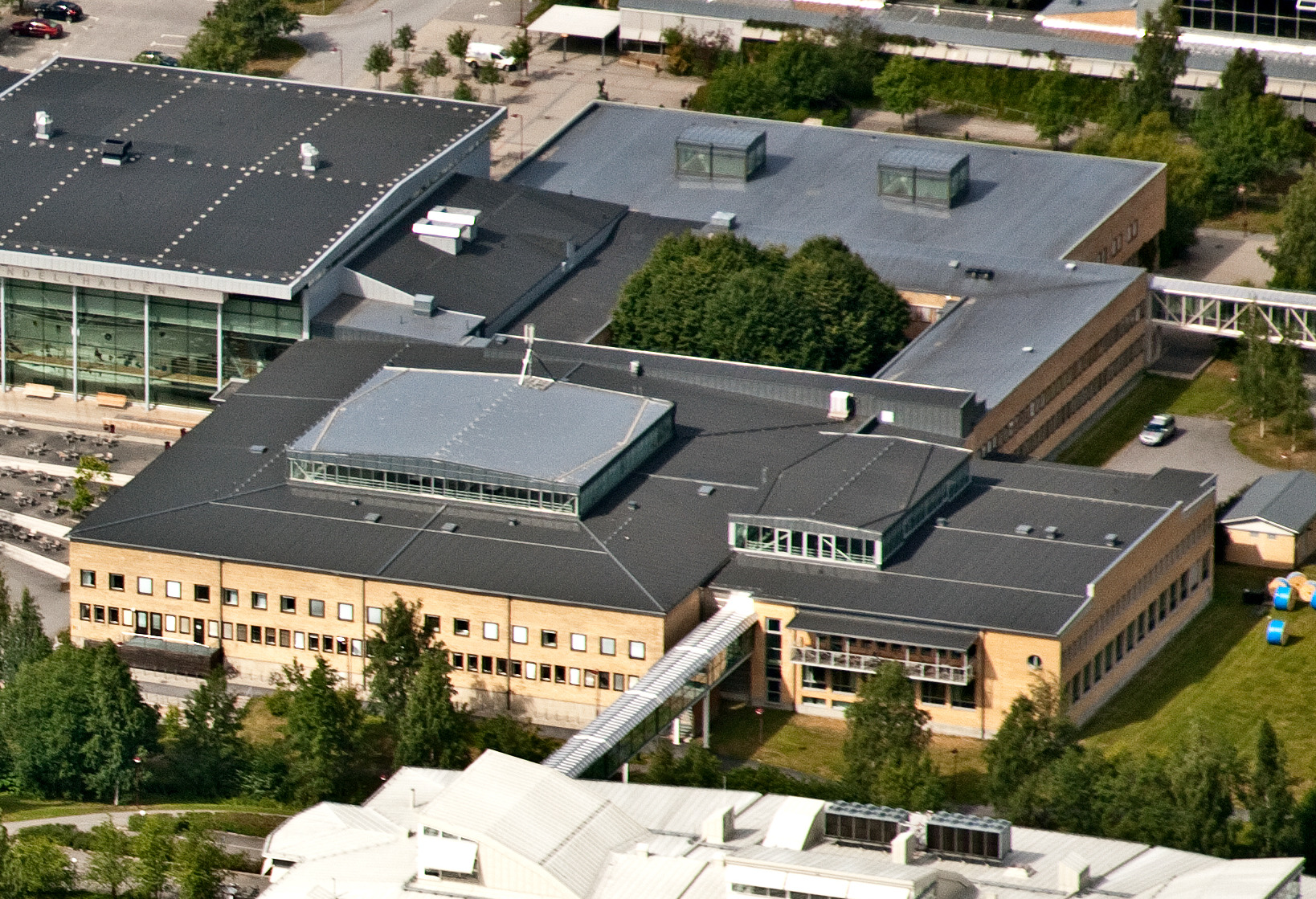
Aerial photo of the University Library

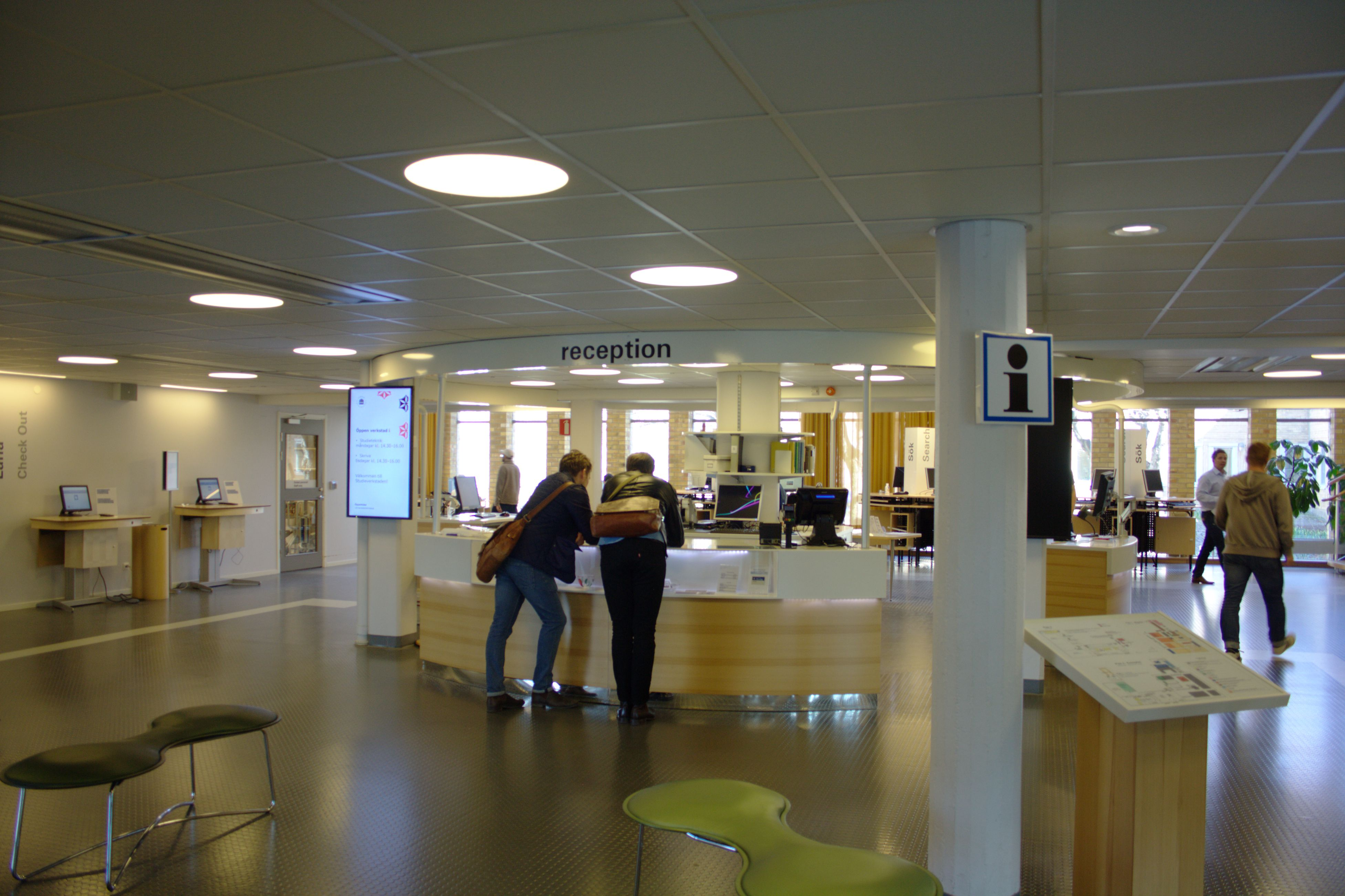
The library reception
