= Sundsvall Regional Hospital =

Hospital in Sweden

Coordinates: 62.4080°N 17.3058°E

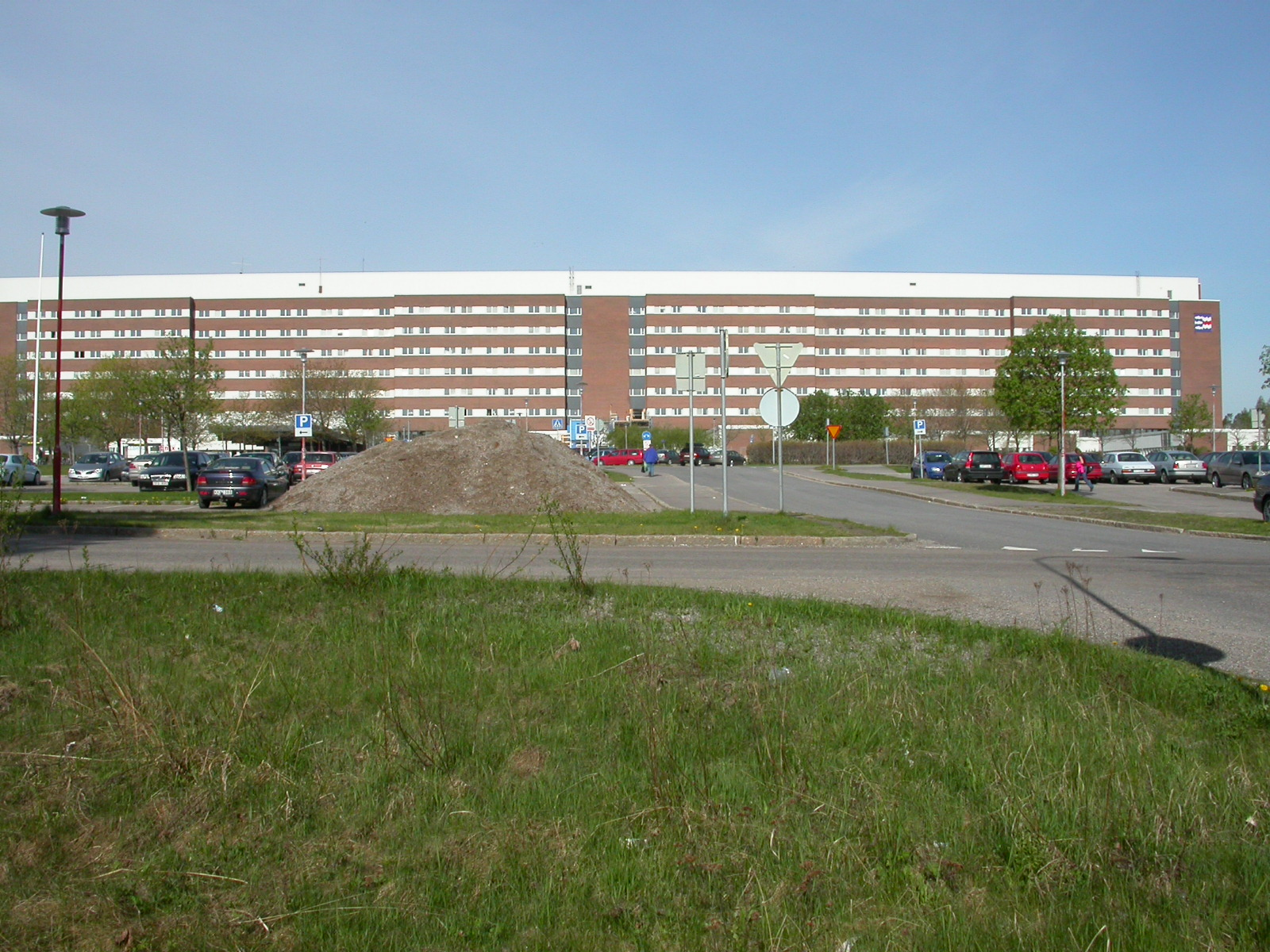

Sundsvall Regional Hospital is one of three hospitals in the Västernorrland County. The hospital operates mainly in Sundsvall, but also in Härnösand, under joint hospital management. The hospital cooperates with other health care in the county, and the University Hospital of Umeå, Västerbotten County.

== Size and coverage ==
Sundsvall Regional Hospital offers for example emergency hospital care, childbirth and specialist healthcare. There were 383 beds as of 2012, including 65 in psychiatry, and approximately 2,400 employees. Sundsvall Regional Hospital covers 190,000 m^{2} and serves a population of between 130,000 and 150,000. It is cooled down year-round by stored snow, bringing down energy consumption for hospital cooling by 90%.

== History ==
Sundsvalls lasarettsdirektion (Sundsvall Hospital Executive) rented two beds for medical purposes 1776-1783. During the war years 1808-1809, the distillery on Holmgatan at Åkroken served as a field hospital. In 1875, a new hospital building was completed in the Norrmalm area. The current building was inaugurated in 1975, and is located in the Haga area.
