= Pär Hallström =

Pär Hallström (born 7 May 1947) is a Swedish legal writer and professor emeritus of Law at Umeå University. He graduated from Pantheon-Sorbonne University with a Diplôme d'Etudes Supérieures and holds a doctorate in law from Stockholm University.

Hallström introduced EC constitutional law in Sweden with his work Europeisk Gemenskap och politisk union (European Community and Political Union), 1987, and WTO-law with his book The GATT Panels and the Formation of International Trade Law, 1994.

Hallström's partial bibliography can be found in the Festschrift Festskrift till Pär Hallström (Uppsala 2012).
