= Lars Thelander =

Swedish biochemist

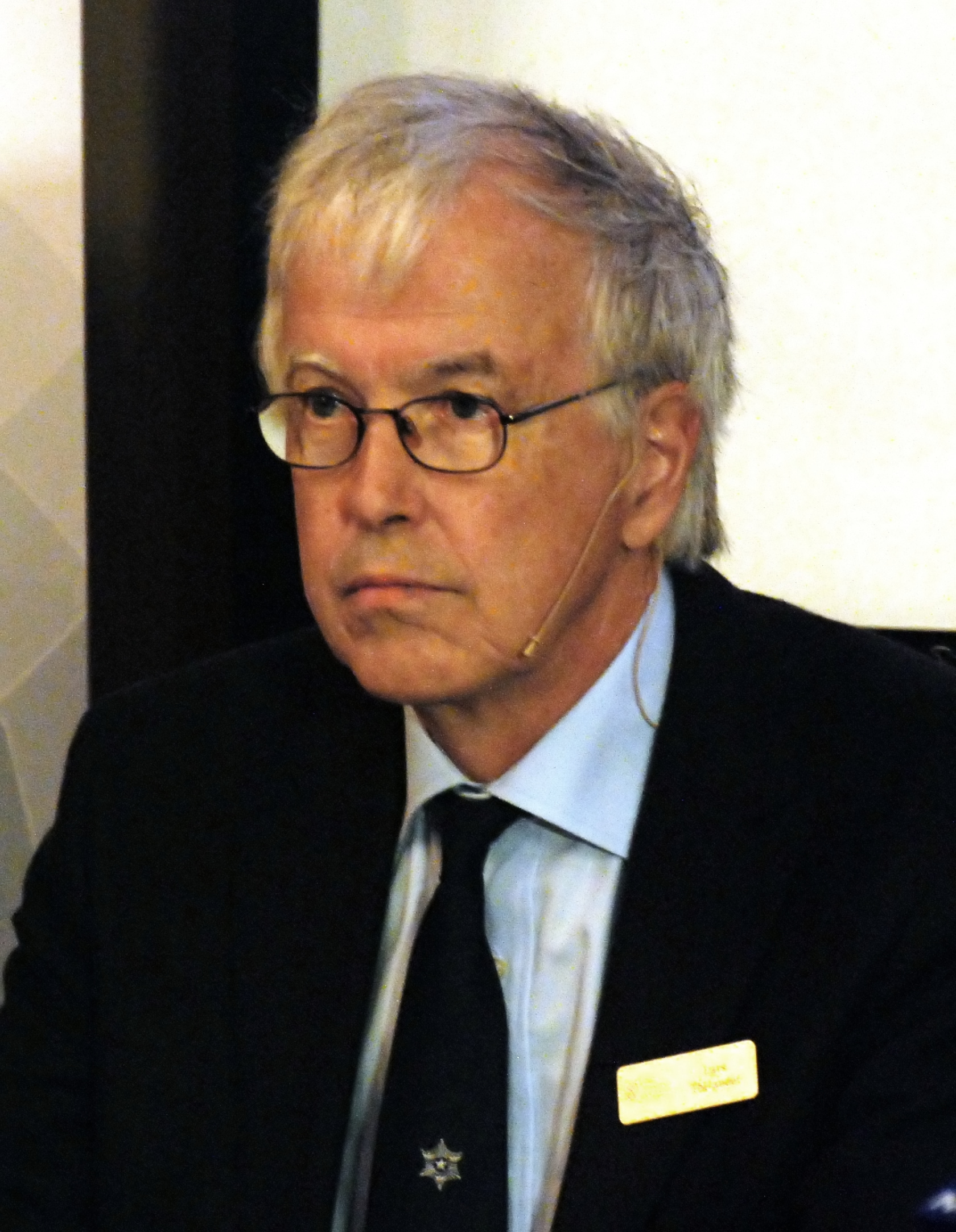
Lars Thelander

Lars Thelander, born 1942, is a Swedish biochemist. He was awarded a Ph.D. degree at the Karolinska Institutet in 1968. and is a professor of medical chemistry and biophysics at Umeå University.

Thelander is a member of the Royal Swedish Academy of Sciences since 1994, a member of the Nobel Committee for Chemistry since 2006 and the Committees chairman since 2010. In 2004, he delivered the presentation speech for the Nobel Prize in Chemistry.
