= Astrid Norberg =

Swedish nurse and educator

Astrid Norberg (born 1939) is a registered nurse and professor emerita in nursing at Umeå University, Sweden. Norberg has a PhD in pedagogy from Lund University and started as a Sweden's first professor in nursing research in 1987. Her research has mainly been about dementia and ethics.

== Sources ==
- Medierna varnade för Astrid, Vårdfacket 3 mars 2006 (In Swedish)
- Astrid Norberg: Framtidens omvårdnad: Partnerskap mellan patient och personal (In Swedish)
