= Åsa Larsson Blind =

Swedish-Sámi politician

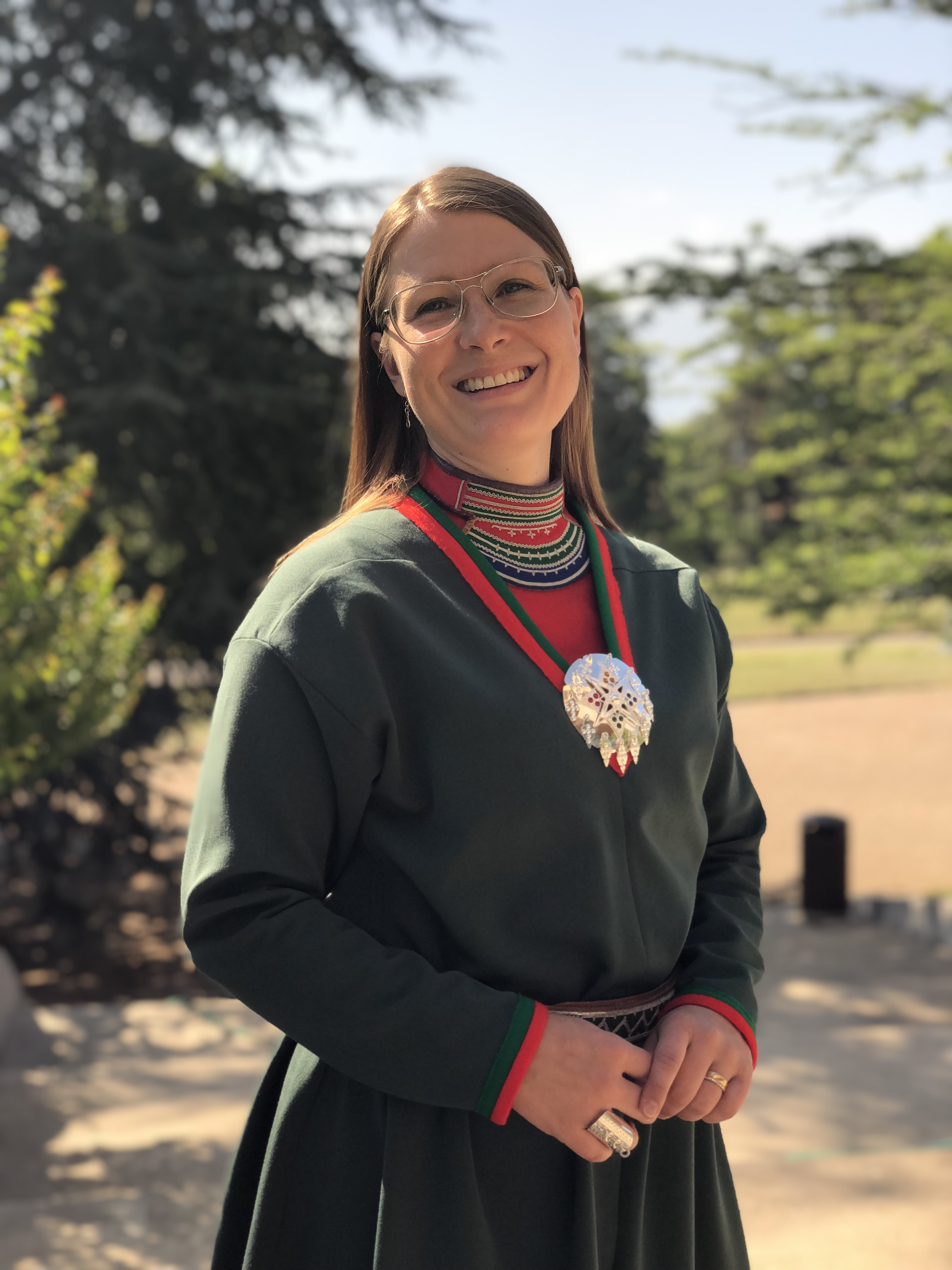

Saami Council Vice President
- Incumbent
- Assumed office 23 February 2021

Saami Council President
- In office 11 February 2017 – 23 February 2021

Saami Council Vice President
- In office 2011 – 11 February 2017

Personal details
- Born: 29 August 1980 (age 46)
- Education: University of Umeå

Åsa Larsson Blind (born 29 August 1980) is a Swedish-Sámi politician who as of March 2021 serves as vice president of the Saami Council.

== Political life ==
She grew up in a Sámi family that cares for reindeer. She has studied at the University of Umeå and holds a master's degree in human resource management. Larsson Blind joined the Saami Council in 2008 as a representative of Ruoŧa Sámiid Riikkasearvi (SSR, the National Union of the Swedish Sámi People). In 2011, she was elected vice president of the council and in February 2017 was elected president. Her term as president ended in February 2021 and she was again elected vice president. In her time with the Saami Council, Larsson Blind also served from 2011 to 2015, on the board of the Arctic Council Indigenous Peoples Secretariat.

In 2019, she became the first woman elected to lead the SSR.

== Personal life ==
Born to a family of reindeer herders, Larsson Blind is originally from Rans Sameby in Västerbotten, Sweden, but lives in Övre Soppero in Norrbotten. She holds a master's degree in human resources management from the University of Umeå.
