= HUMlab =

Swedish research laboratory

Humlab is an interdisciplinary lab at Umeå University in the north east of Sweden. Its organization was founded in 1997 and it opened as a functioning lab space in 2000. It is a research center and an infrastructure and functions as a teaching space, a laboratory and a studio.

Current focus areas include digital methods, digital practices, art and pedagogical development in digital and hybrid environments.

== Humlab (the laboratory) ==
The main premises were founded by the university's Faculty of Arts and are situated in the cellar below Umeå University Library.
