= Umeå School of Education =

Swedish college

Umeå School of Education is a college of education in Sweden tied to Umeå University. It replaced the old education faculty that before 2008/2009 offered all teacher training at the university.

The school offers all sorts of teacher trainings, from preschool to gymnasium, including education for student guiding and special teaching.

Currently the school puts great emphasis on the following research fields: Measurement and evaluation, Read and write research, Mathematical didactics and ICT, media and learning.

In the future it will offer additional research subjects such as Education history with historical didactics, Memory and learning and Education of young people, career development and welfare.

== Sources ==
- Umeå School of Education, Official website
