= Umeå Arts Campus =

Coordinates: 63°49′14″N 20°16′34″E

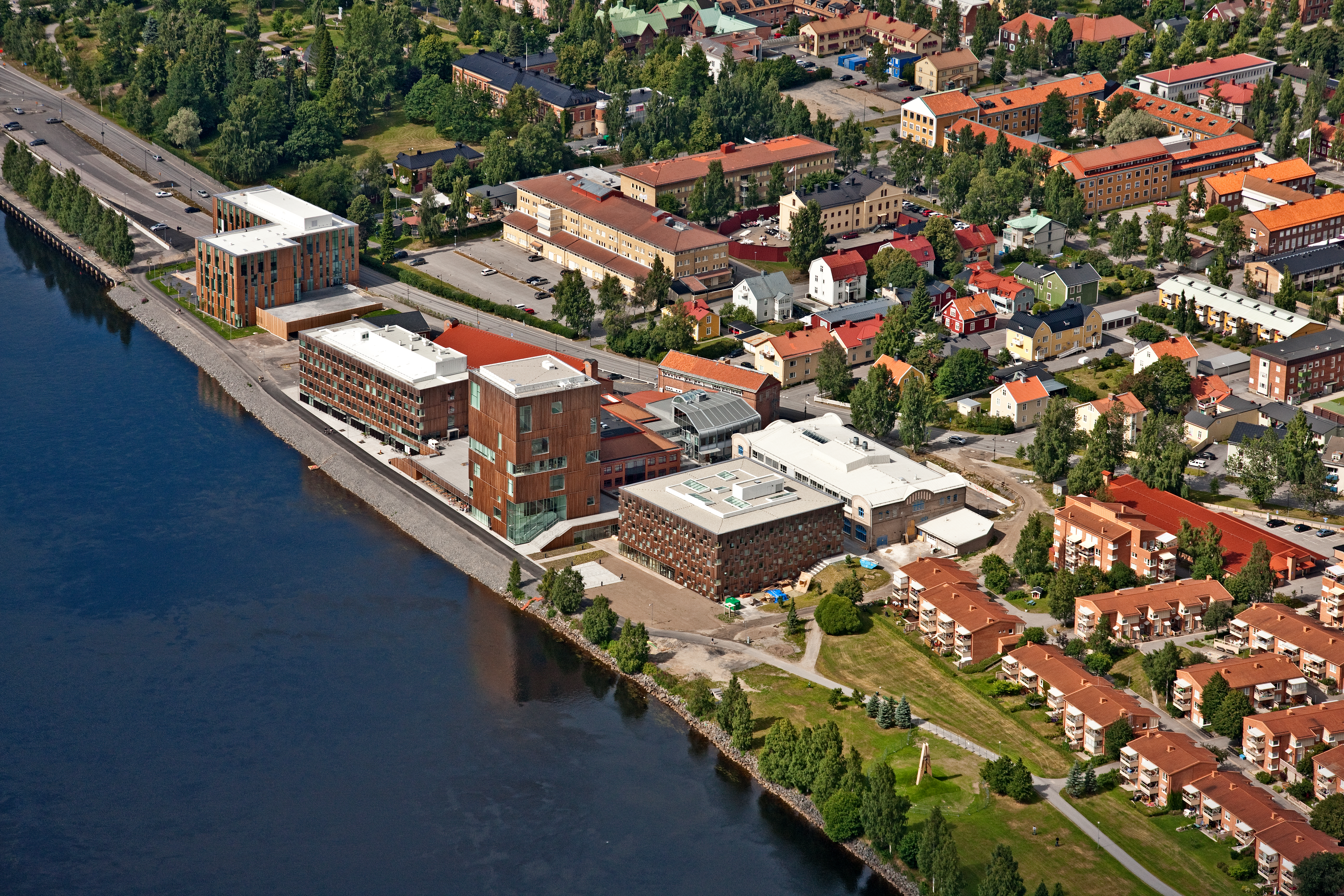
Umeå Arts Campus

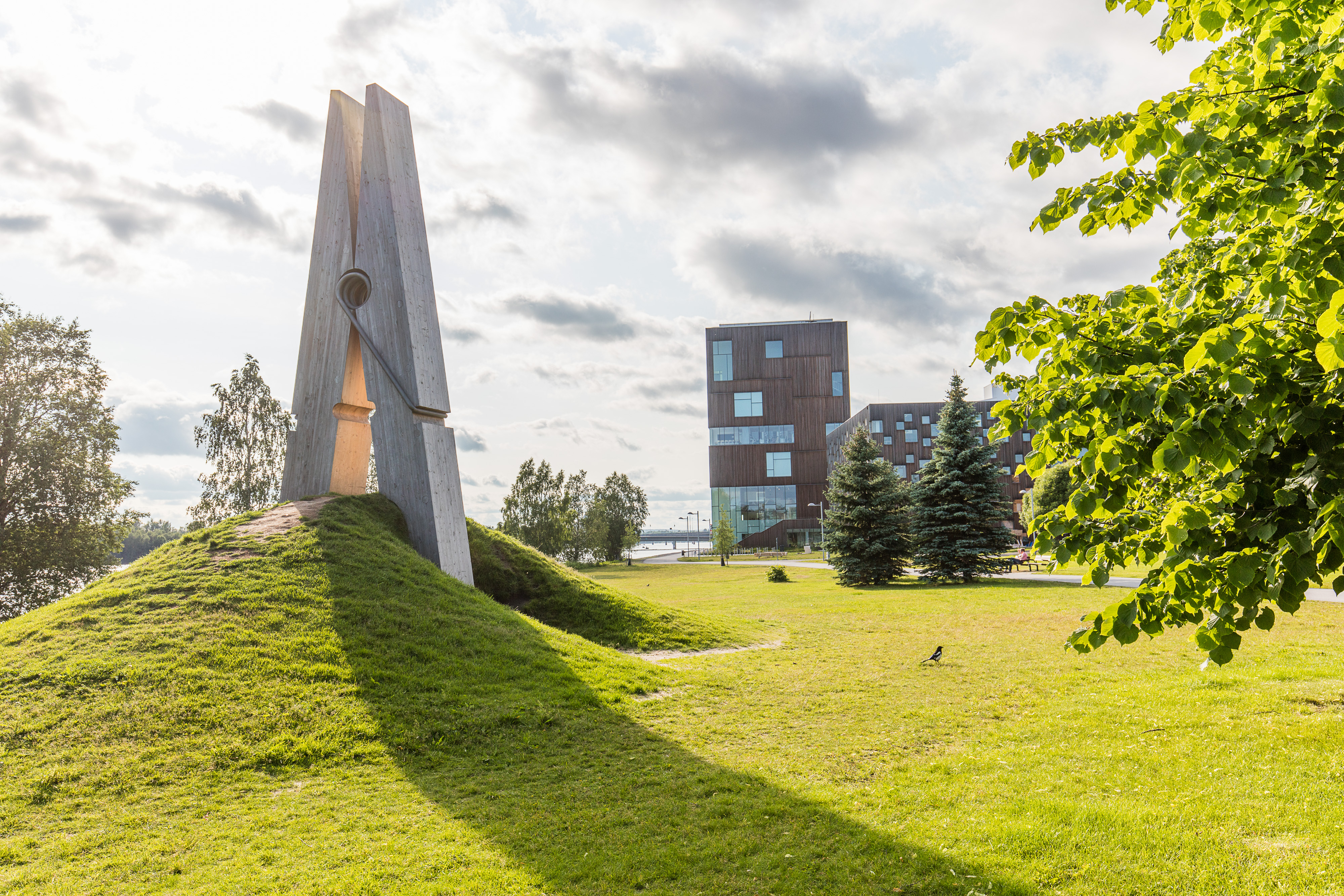
The sculpture "Skin 4" by Mehmet Ali Uysal with Bildmuseet in the background.

Umeå Arts Campus is the name of a former industry area that from 2009–2012 was rebuilt to house several of the arts educations at Umeå University in Sweden. The arts campus is an education center for architecture, design and artwork.

Famous departments at the Umeå Arts Campus include Umeå Academy of Fine Arts, Umeå Institute of Design, Umeå School of Architecture, the experimental platform for "humanities and new media", HUMlab, and the contemporary art museum, Bildmuseet.

In the autumn fall of 2008, the Baltic Group Foundation announced that it will grant Umeå Arts Campus 36,6 million Swedish kronor. In December the same year, the Umeå University board of directors decided to grant a total of 350 million Swedish kronor during a six-year-period to building development of the arts campus.

First established in the area was the Academy of Fine Arts, which started 1987, in a rebuilt wooden factory from the early 20th century, followed in 1989 by the Institute of Design, housed in a former transformator station. The first mayor new contribution to the arts campus is the new School of Architecture – by Henning Larsen Architects – that opened fall 2010. Three more new buildings – for the art academy, Bildmuseet and HUMlab – opened during the first half of 2012.
