= Gunnar Öquist =

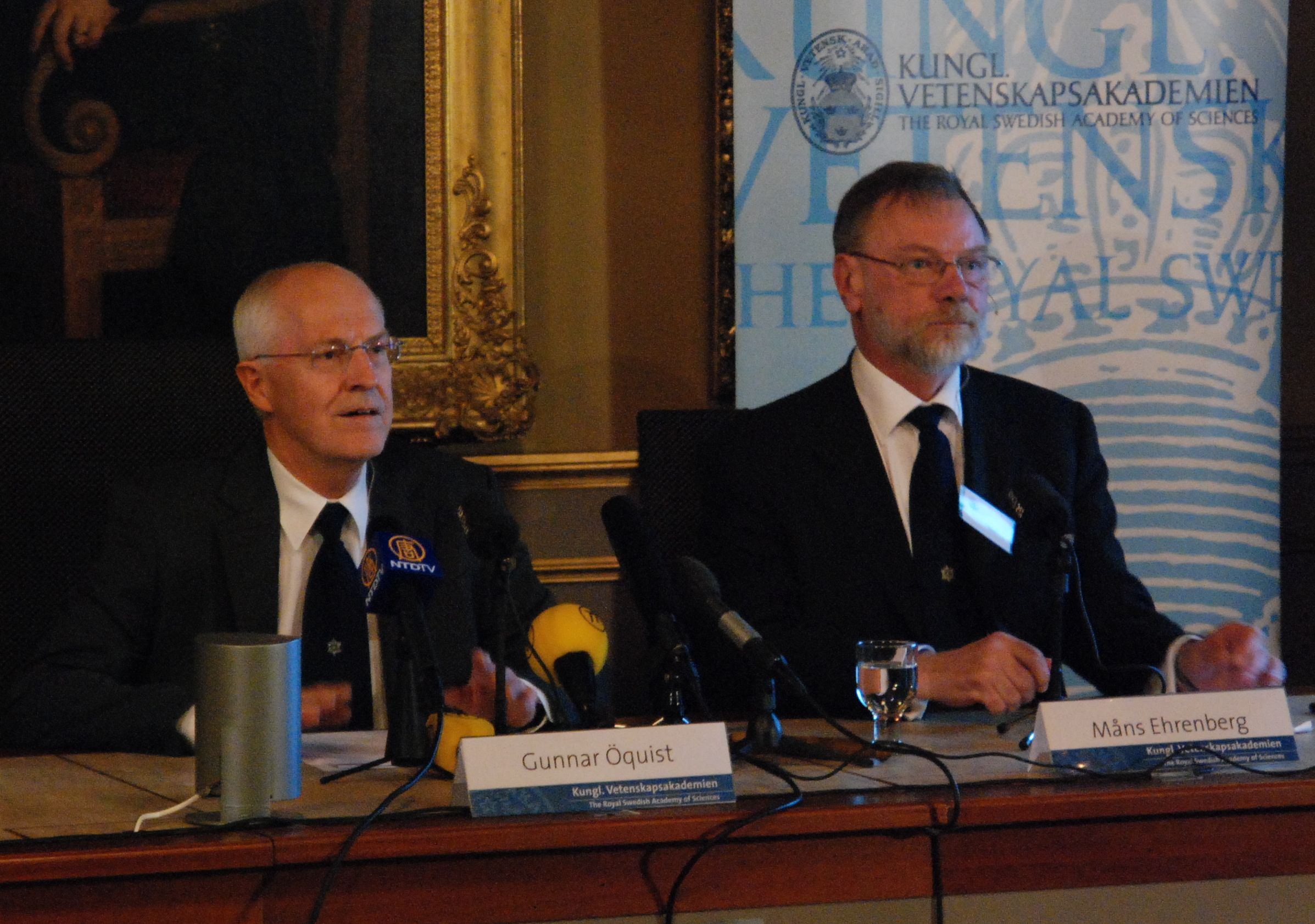
Gunnar Öquist (left) at the press conference announcing the winners of the 2008 Nobel Prize for Chemistry. (Right Nobel Committee member Måns Ehrenberg.)

Gunnar Öquist (born 1941) is a Swedish biologist and professor of plant physiology at Umeå University, and served as the permanent secretary of the Royal Swedish Academy of Sciences from 2003 to 2010.

He graduated from Uppsala University in 1967 and enrolled in postgraduate studies in Umeå in 1968. He earned his Ph.D. at Umeå University in 1972 with the Thesis Some effects of light intensity and iron deficiency on pigmentation and photosynthesis in the blue-green alga Anacystis nidulans. He was made docent in plant physiology 1974. After two years at Lund University he returned to Umeå in 1976 and was made a professor in 1981.

Öquist's field of research has been the adaptation of photosynthesis in cyanobacteria, algae and higher plants when they are submitted to variations in light intensity, temperature, supply of water or supply of nutrition.

Öquist served as the main secretary of the Natural Sciences Research Council (NFR), a former Swedish governmental body for science funding, from 1993 to 1999.

Öquist has been a member of the Royal Swedish Academy of Sciences since 1986, and became the academy's permanent secretary on 1 July 2003, when he succeeded Erling Norrby. On 1 July 2010 Öquist retired from the post and was succeeded by Staffan Normark.
