= Global Health Action =

- Discipline: Global Health
- Language: English
- Edited by: Maria Nilsson

Publication details
- History: 2008-present
- Publisher: Taylor & Francis
- Frequency: Continuous
- Open access: Yes
- License: Creative Commons Attribution 4.0
- Impact factor: 2.996 (2021)

Standard abbreviations
- ISO 4: Glob. Health Action

Indexing
- ISSN: 1654-9716 (print); 1654-9880 (web)
- OCLC no.: 643984001

Links
- Journal homepage; Online access

Global Health Action is a peer-reviewed open access journal publishing research on global health. Global Health Action is published by Taylor & Francis in partnership and a 50/50 ownership agreement with Umeå University, Sweden.

According to the Journal Citation Reports, the journal had a 2021 impact factor of 2.996.
