= Johan Redström =

Johan Gunnar Redström (born 1973) is a professor at the Umeå Institute of Design, Umeå University, Sweden since 2012. Previously, he has been Studio Director of the Design Research Unit, Interactive Institute, adjunct professor at the School of Textiles, University of Borås, Associate Research Professor at the Center for Design Research at the Royal Academy of Fine Arts, School of Architecture, in Copenhagen, Denmark, and a lecturer and program manager of the Masters Program in Interaction Design at the IT University in Gothenburg. His background is in philosophy, music and interaction design. He received a PhD from University of Gothenburg in 2001, and became Docent in Interaction Design in 2008.

Redström's research aims at combining philosophical and artistic approaches with focus on experimental design, critical practice and the aesthetics of computational technology as material in design. Research programs include on designing for reflection rather than efficiency in use, on combining traditional design and new technologies, and subsequently on increasing energy awareness through critical and conceptual design.

== Publications ==
Books and book chapters

- Mazé, R., Redström, J., Studienhefte Problemorientiertes Design #8: Schwierige Formen, adocs, Hamburg (2018) ISBN 978-3-943253-23-8
- Koskinen, I., Binder, T., Redström, J., Wensveen, S. and Zimmerman, J. (2011). Design Research Through Practice: Lab, Field and Showroom. Morgan Kaufmann.
- Redström, J (2011). The Useless Within. In Duarte, F. and Bruinsma, M. (Eds.) Useless, The EXD'11 Reader.Experimenta, Lisbon.
- Redström, J. (2010). Research Frames. In Mazé, R. (Ed.) Static! Designing for energy awareness. Arvinius.
- Redström, J. (2010). Current issues in sustainable design and research. In Mazé, R. (Ed.) Static! Designing for energy awareness. Arvinius.
- Redström, J. (2008). Disruptions. In Binder, Löwgren and Malmborg (Eds.)(Re)Searching the Digital Bauhaus, pp. 191–217. Springer.
- Redström, J. Aesthetic Concerns. In Giaglis, G. and Kourouthanassis, P. (Eds.) Pervasive Information Systems. M. E. Sharpe. Abstract
- Redström, J. (2007). En experimenterande designforskning. I Ilstedt Hjelm, S. (red.) Under ytan. Raster Förlag & SVID.
- Hallnäs, L. and Redström, J. (2006). Interaction Design: Foundations, Experiments. Textile Research Centre, Swedish School of Textiles, University College of Borås and Interactive Institute. download
- Redström, M., Redström, J. and Mazé, R. (Eds.) (2005). IT+Textiles. Edita Publishing Oy, Finland. order book
- Eriksson, D., Ernevi, A., Jacobs, M., Löfgren, U., Mazé, R., Redström, J., Thoresson, J. & Worbin, L. (2005). Tic Tac Textiles: A Waiting Game In IT+Textiles, p. 66-75.
- Ernevi, A., Redström, J., Redström, M. & Worbin, L. (2005). The Interactive Pillows. In IT+Textiles, p. 47-54.
- Ernevi, A., Redström, J. & Zetterblom, M. (2005). Mute. In IT+Textiles, p. 89-90.
- Ernevi, A., Jacobs, M., Mazé, R., Müller, C., Redström, J., & Worbin, L. (2005). The Energy Curtain: Energy Awareness. In IT+Textiles, p. 91-96.
- Redström, J. (2005). IT+Textiles. In IT+Textiles, p. 6-11.
- Redström, J. (2005). On technology as material in design. In IT+Textiles, p. 12-29.
- Redström, J. (2005). Information Deliverer: Abstract Information Appliances. In IT+Textiles, p. 76-83.
