= Karl-Fredrik Norrback =

Swedish medical doctor and researcher (born 1972)

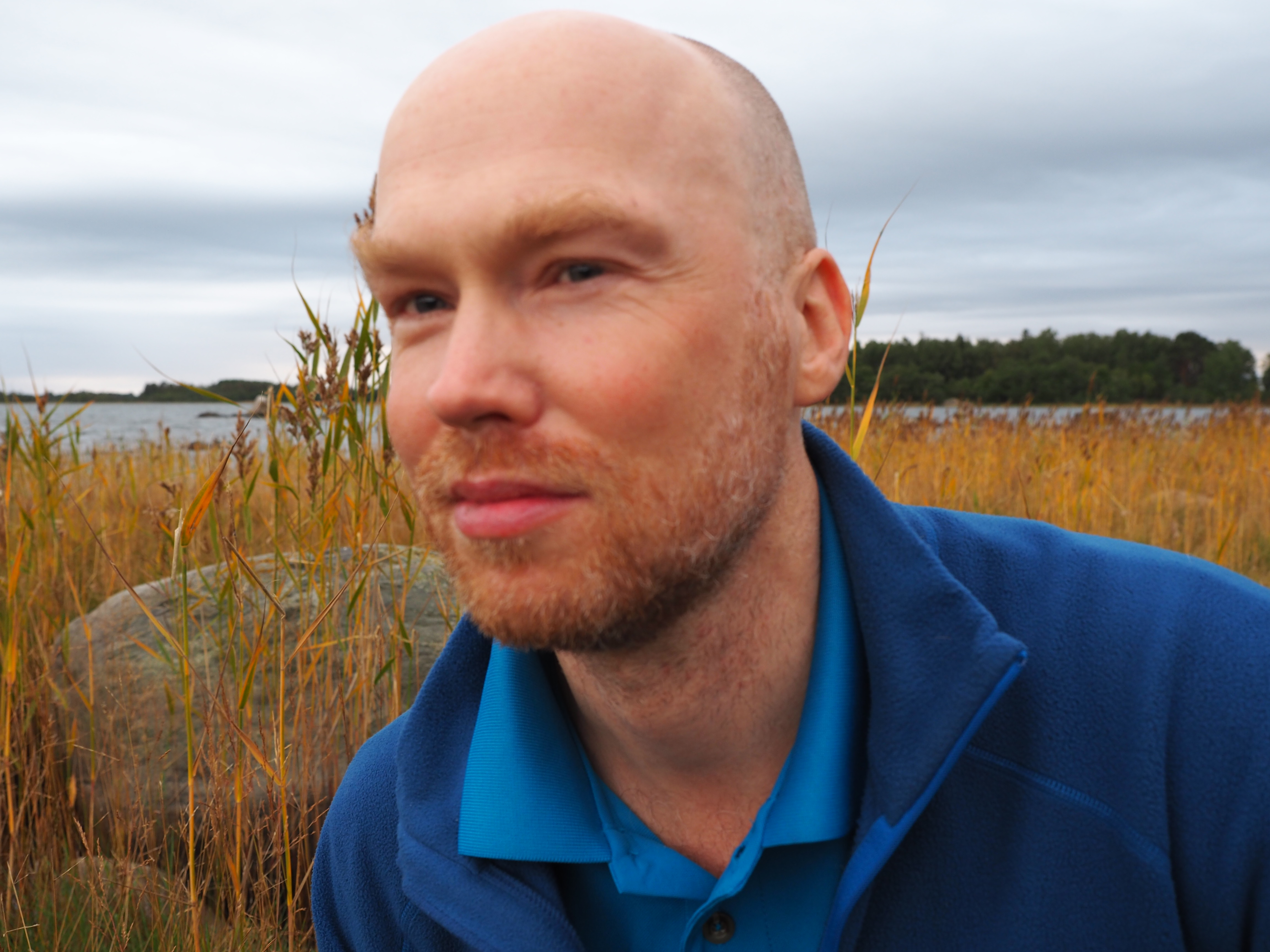
- Born: Stockholm, Sweden
- Education: Umeå University
- Scientific career
- Workplaces: Umeå University

Karl-Fredrik Norrback is an associate Professor, a Medical Doctor, a Therapist, a Philosopher (Masters degree in Philosophy) and a Futures expert from Finland and Sweden. He is an associate Professor of Psychiatry and a researcher at the department of Clinical Sciences, Unit of Psychiatry, Umeå University, Sweden and he holds both the title of Docent in Psychiatry and the title of Docent in Psychology (associate Professor-level competence) at Umeå University and Åbo Akademi University, Turku, Finland, respectively.

== Education ==
He received his PhD in medicine at Umeå University, Sweden at the Department of Medical Biosciences in 2000 and his MD at Umeå University, Sweden in 2004.

== Research ==
Norrback's work has mostly been connected to the Betula project, a longitudinal multiple outcome research project, which in 2005 was appointed as one of the leading research environments in Sweden by the Swedish Research Council, and the Northern Sweden psychiatric multiple outcomes studies led by Professor Rolf Adolfsson, Umeå University.

=== Telomerase and telomere biology ===
Norrback has performed research into the roles of telomerase activity and telomere length regulation in immune cells and its malignant counterparts.

He has worked on potential roles of telomerase activity and telomere length for the inflammatory process and for immunological memory which both are dependent on immune cell proliferation. More recently, he has been involved in evaluating the biomarker value of telomere length with respect to structural and functional measures of the brain, particularly increased stress. His work he has contributed to the body of research which supports considering telomere length as a biomarker of increased levels of chronic stress, as well as containing information pertaining to the proliferative history and future proliferative potential of cells.

=== Stress and stress dysregulation ===
Norrback also works on the causes and effects of stress and stress-dysregulation in the general population as well as in affective disorders, which are believed to be stress-related conditions. The research has provided additional support for the condition denoted hypocortisolism, which is characterized by a long-term lowering of the cortisol levels, believed to be induced through an increased stress load. Norrback's research has shown that there exist significant associations between hypocortisolism and affective disorders, accelerated cellular aging, psychosomatic conditions, pain and inflammatory symptoms and markers of inflammation.

=== Psychosomatics ===
Norrback's research in this area has mainly concerned the functional gastrointestinal condition irritable bowel syndrome (IBS), but also spans different functional gastrointestinal symptoms as well as pain conditions and pain symptoms. He has tried to address the potential roles of stress- and mood-dysregulation for the etiology, expression and progression of pain and intestinal symptoms as well as conditions. The studies supported that both pain and gastrointestinal symptoms as well as conditions are significantly associated with affective disorders, depressive symptoms and hypocortisolism. The research hence shows support for both stress- and mood-dysregulation as being involved in intestinal and pain symptoms as well as conditions.
