= Birgitta Henriques-Normark =

Swedish physician and researcher (born 1958)

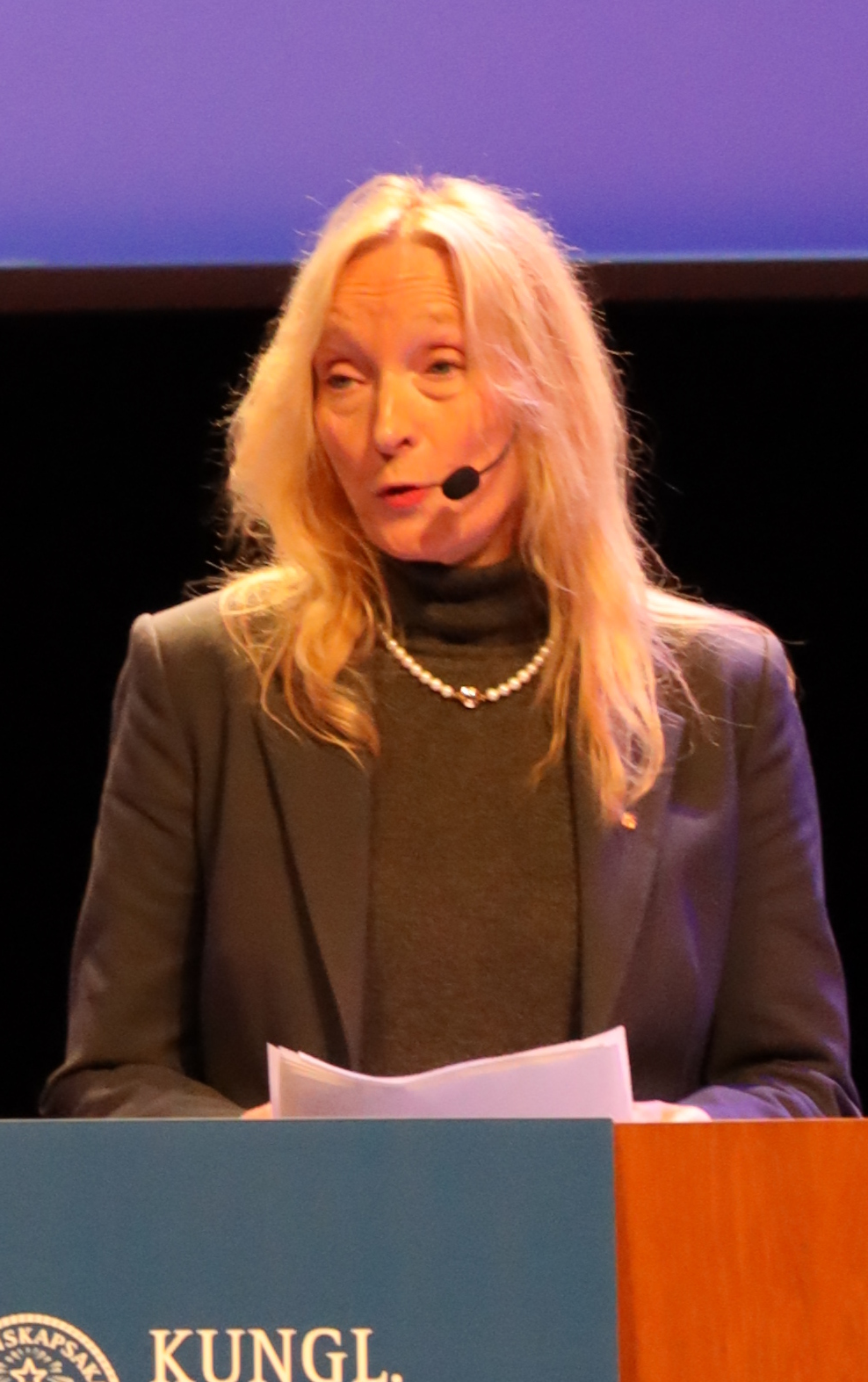
- Henriques-Normark at the 2024 Nobel Prize lectures
- Born: 22 June 1958 (age 68)
- Education: Karolinska Institute
- Spouse: Staffan Normark
- Scientific career
- Thesis: Streptococcus pneumoniae : molecular epidemiology of isolates causing invasive disease and characterization of tolerance responses to lytic antibiotics (2000)

Birgitta Henriques-Normark (born 22 June 1958) is a Swedish physician and researcher, focusing on the field of host-bacteria interactions and pneumococcal infections. She is a professor of Clinical Microbiology at the Karolinska Institute and is the head physician at the Karolinska University Hospital. She is a member of a number of academies including the European Academy of Microbiology, the American Academy of Microbiology, and the Royal Swedish Academy of Sciences, of which she was elected president in 2022.

== Career ==
As a physician, Henriques-Normark worked at the Swedish Institute for Infectious Disease Control, where she became the department head. In 2008, Henriques-Normark became a professor in the field of medical microbial pathogenesis, and then in 2011, was appointed to a joint position as a professor of Clinical Microbiology at the Karolinska Institute and Head Physician at the Karolinska University Hospital, in the department of Microbiology, Tumour and Cell Biology. In the same year, she was awarded a grant from the Knut and Alice Wallenberg Foundation to study pneumococcal infections, which amounts to 25.8 million SEK over 5 years.

She is an elected member or fellow of a number of academic societies: in 2013, she was elected fellow of the European Academy of Microbiology, in 2015 as a fellow of the American Academy of Microbiology, in 2018 as a member of the Swedish Royal Academy of Sciences, and in 2019 both as a member of the European Molecular Biology Organisation and as a member of the Nobel Assembly at the Karolinska Institute, which awards the Nobel Prize. In 2022, she was elected president of the Swedish Royal Academy of Sciences.

She has fulfilled a number of key roles at the Karolinska Institute. She was the Vice Dean for Recruitment for 6 years, the Academic Vice President for Research, and Chairman of the Committee for Research. Outside of the KI, she has evaluated research for the ERC and the EU commission, is a member of a steering board for medicine and health at the Swedish Research Council, and is a member of the European Academy of Microbiology Executive Board.

== Honours ==
- Order of the Rising Sun, 2nd Class, Gold and Silver Star (2025)
