= Staffan Normark =

Swedish microbiologist and physician

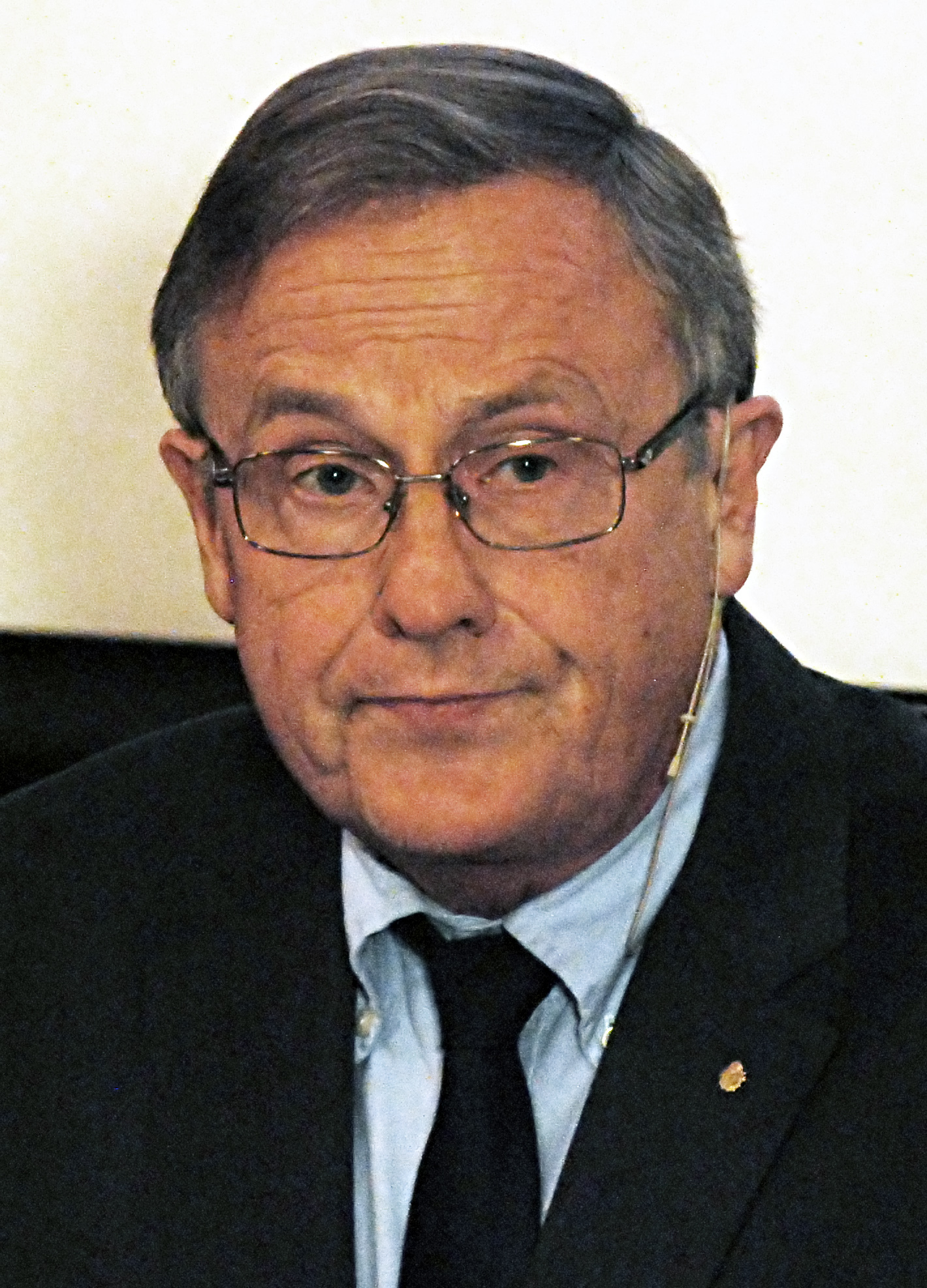
Staffan Normark

Jan Staffan Normark (born 1945) is a Swedish physician, microbiologist and infectious disease researcher. He grew up in Umeå and was awarded his Ph.D. at Umeå University in 1971. At the end of the 1970s, he was one of the first Swedish scientists to use the new genetic engineering tools in infection-related research. In 1980, he was made a professor at Umeå University, then the university's youngest. 1989 he was recruited as professor of molecular microbiology to the School of Medicine at Washington University in St. Louis. 1993 he returned to Sweden as professor of infectious disease control, in particular clinical bacteriology, at Karolinska Institutet. From 1999 to 2005 he served as the Executive Director of the Swedish Foundation for Strategic Research (SSF). In 2008 he was active at Umeå University to build up a research group within bioinformatics and infection research. Much of his research in the 2000s have focussed on pneumococcus.

Normark was elected a member of the Royal Swedish Academy of Sciences in 1987 and took up the position as the Academy's permanent secretary on 1 July 2010, when he succeeded Gunnar Öquist.

1992 he was awarded the Göran Gustafsson Prize in medicine and in 1999 he was elected a member of the Royal Swedish Academy of Engineering Sciences. He was elected a foreign associate of the US National Academy of Sciences in April 2019.

Staffan Normark is married to Birgitta Henriques-Normark, also a professor and researcher within infectious disease at Karolinska Institutet.
