= Climate Impacts Research Centre =

Swedish research center

Coordinates: 68°21′16″N 18°48′56″E

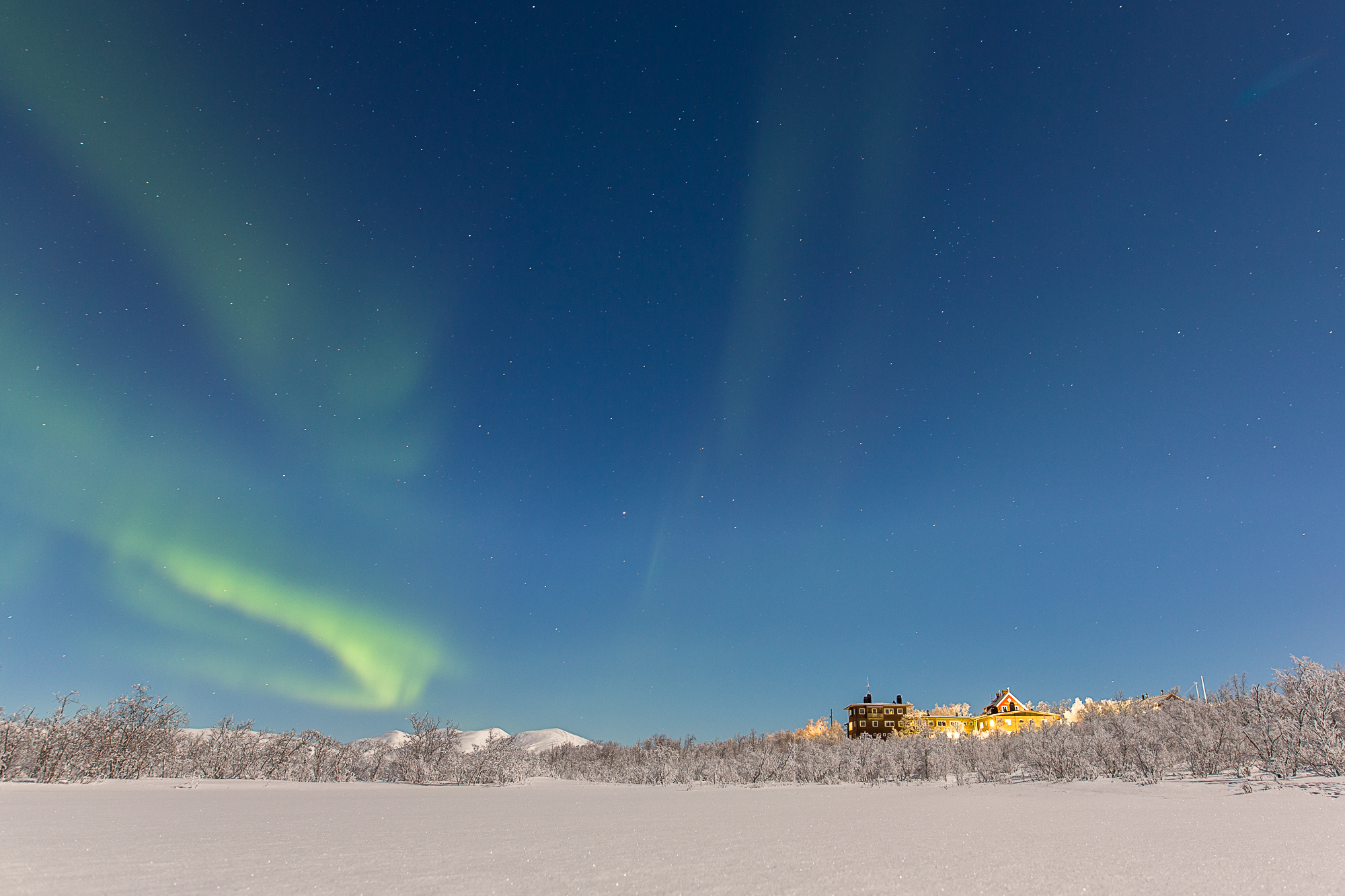
- Northern lights at CIRC
- Abbreviation: CIRC
- Formation: 1990; 36 years ago
- Type: research institute
- Purpose: Research and education about Arctic and alpine ecosystems
- Headquarters: Abisko, Umeå
- Location: Abisko Scientific Research Station
- Region served: The Arctic, Norrland
- Official language: English, Swedish
- Science director: Jan Karlsson
- Project Coordinator: Keith Larson
- Main organ: Department of ecology and environmental science (EMG)
- Parent organization: Umeå University
- Affiliations: University of the Arctic
- Website: www.arcticcirc.net

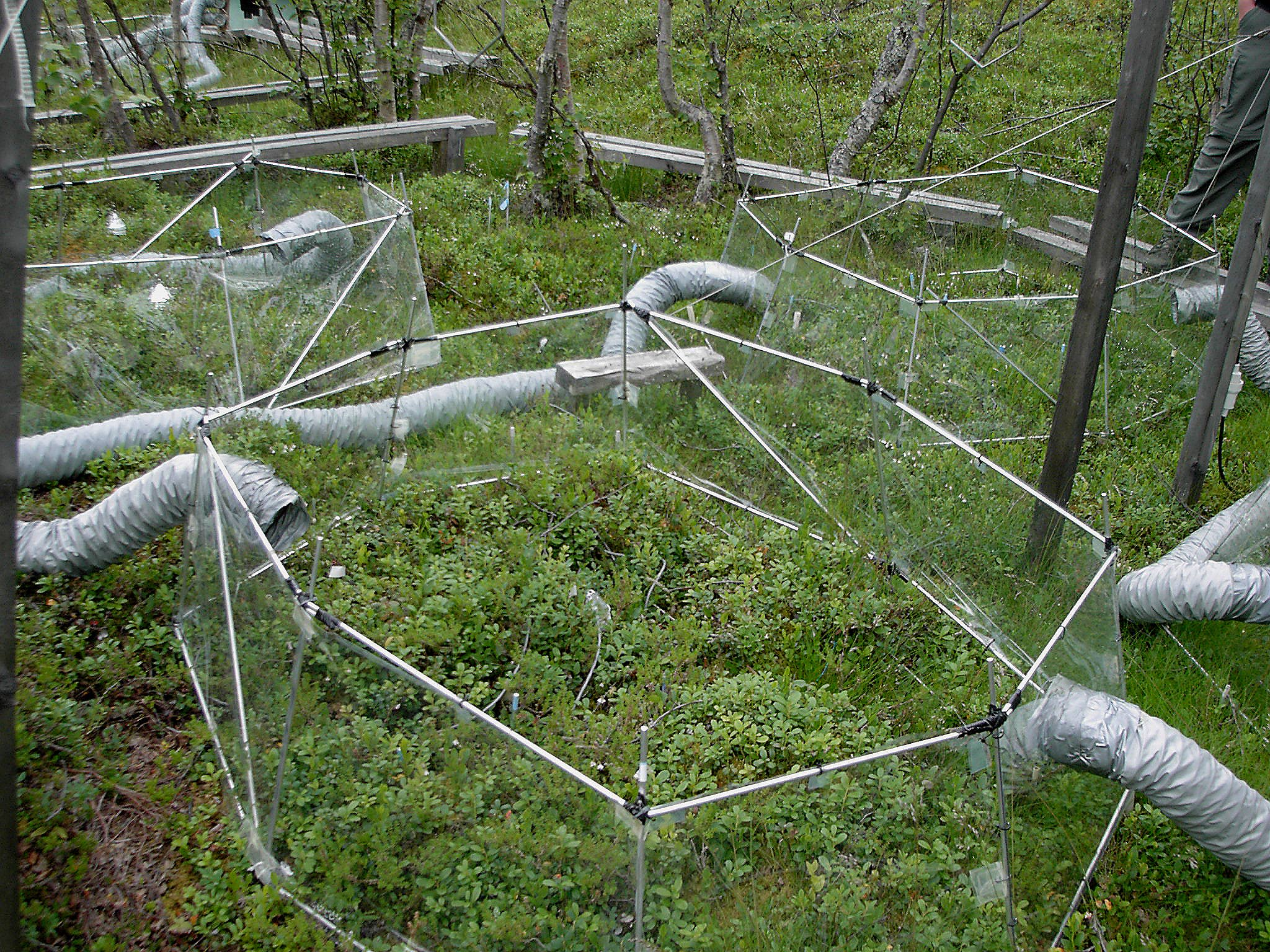
Field research at Torne Basin.

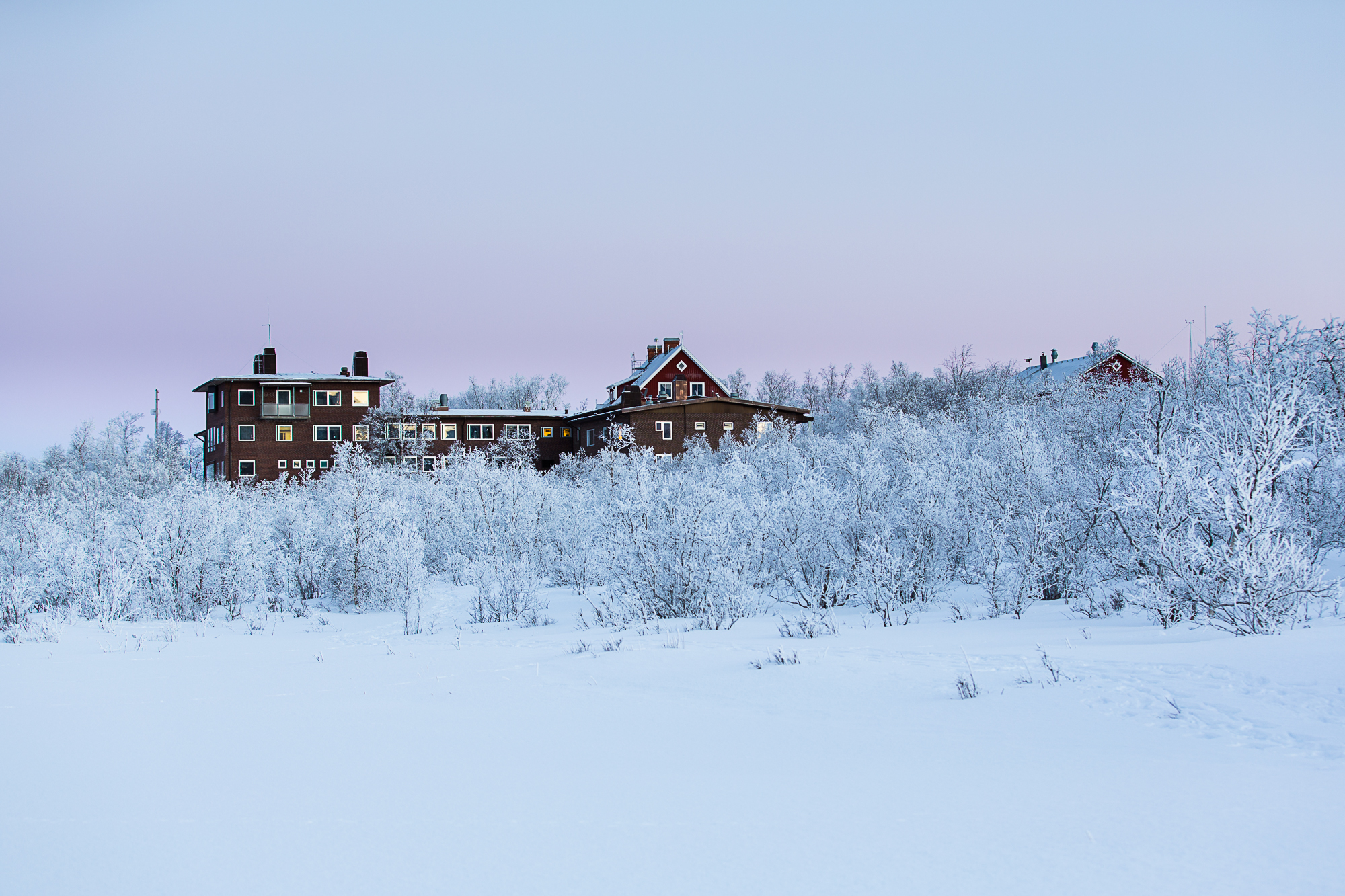
ANS in winter.

Climate Impacts Research Centre (CIRC) is a research institute based at the Department of ecology and environmental science (EMG) at Umeå University, Sweden, but primarily operative at Abisko Scientific Research Station which is run by the Swedish Polar Research Secretariat.

== Research ==
The CIRC research is focused on increasing the knowledge about Arctic and alpine climate ecosystems, for better understanding of climate related impacts on subarctic and arctic environments, both in terrestrial (land based) and aquatic ecosystems.

Within the field of arctic ecology CIRC researchers conduct projects about how the tree line is affected by climate change; how reindeers influence Fell vegetation, and the spread of fish species in lakes and watercourses – historically as well as in the light of recent climate change.

In biogeochemistry researchers study watercourses in northern areas, as well as effects of thawing permafrost in the tundra and other alpine environments, with regard to emissions of greenhouse gases to the atmosphere and export of carbon to coastal areas.

King Carl XVI Gustaf Professorship in Environmental Science 2017/18 was awarded to John Anderson, professor in physical geography and paleolimnology at Loughborough University in the United Kingdom, who will be visiting professor at CIRC these two years.

=== Major research projects ===
In 2016 CIRC was granted 37 million SEK over five years by the Knut and Alice Wallenberg Foundation for the project "Climate change induced regime shifts in northern lake ecosystems", with Jan Karlsson as principal investigator.

=== Wallenberg Academy Fellows ===
As of 2017 three young researchers at CIRC are also appointed Wallenberg Academy Fellows – a career programme, initiated by the Knut and Alice Wallenberg Foundation in close collaboration with five royal academies and sixteen universities in Sweden, that provides long-term funding for the most promising young researchers of all disciplines to develop their projects.

- Ellen Dorrepaal (2012)
- Jonatan Klaminder (2013)
- David Seekell (2015)

Research Sites

The Climate Impacts Research Centre and collaborators maintain several long-term research study sites in the Arctic. These range from sites along mountains, in permafrost regions and in mires. The Stordalen research site, established in the 1970s, is a research site based on the Stordalen network of permafrost thaw ponds and mires in the discontinuous permafrost zone. Nuolja is a mountain which overlooks Abisko and Lake Tornetrask, and features an ecological altitudinal transect extending from the summit to the base, first established by Thore C. E. Fries, Swedish botanist (1886-1930).

== Education ==
Since 2002 CIRC also gives education, like courses in Arctic ecology, Arctic geoecology and Fell ecology, and a postgraduate program. CIRC is also connected to the international cooperative network University of the Arctic.

== History ==
CIRC was founded in 1996 and now (2017) employs some 50 researchers; professors, assistant professors, post docs, doctoral students and visiting professors. Most CIRC researchers are also affiliated to Arcum, Arctic Research Centre at Umeå University.

CIRC's first science director was Reiner Giesler, professor in terrestrial ecology, who in 2015 was followed by Jan Karlsson, professor in physical geography with a specialization in aquatic biogeochemistry.

== See also ==
- Swedish Polar Research Secretariat
