= Umeå University School of Restaurant and Culinary Arts =

Department of Umeå University, Sweden

Coordinates: 63°49′16.16″N 20°18′04.63″E

The Umeå University School of Restaurant and Culinary Arts (Restauranghögskolan i Umeå) is part of the Umeå University.

Studies in culinary arts at Umeå University started in 1996. In 2002 the Umeå University's School of Restaurant and Culinary Arts was inaugurated. Courses are given for a bachelor's degree in creative cooking or restaurant hosting.
