= Umeå University =

Public university in Umeå, Sweden

Coordinates: 63°49′14″N 20°18′13″E

- Umeå universitet Ubmejen universitiähta Uumaja ynivärsiteetti
- Latin: Universitas Umensis
- Type: Public, research university
- Established: 17 September 1965; 60 years ago
- Affiliations: EUA, UArctic
- Rector: Prof. Hans Adolfsson
- Faculty: 4197
- Students: 36,337
- Location: Umeå, Sweden
- Campus: Urban
- Website: www.umu.se/en

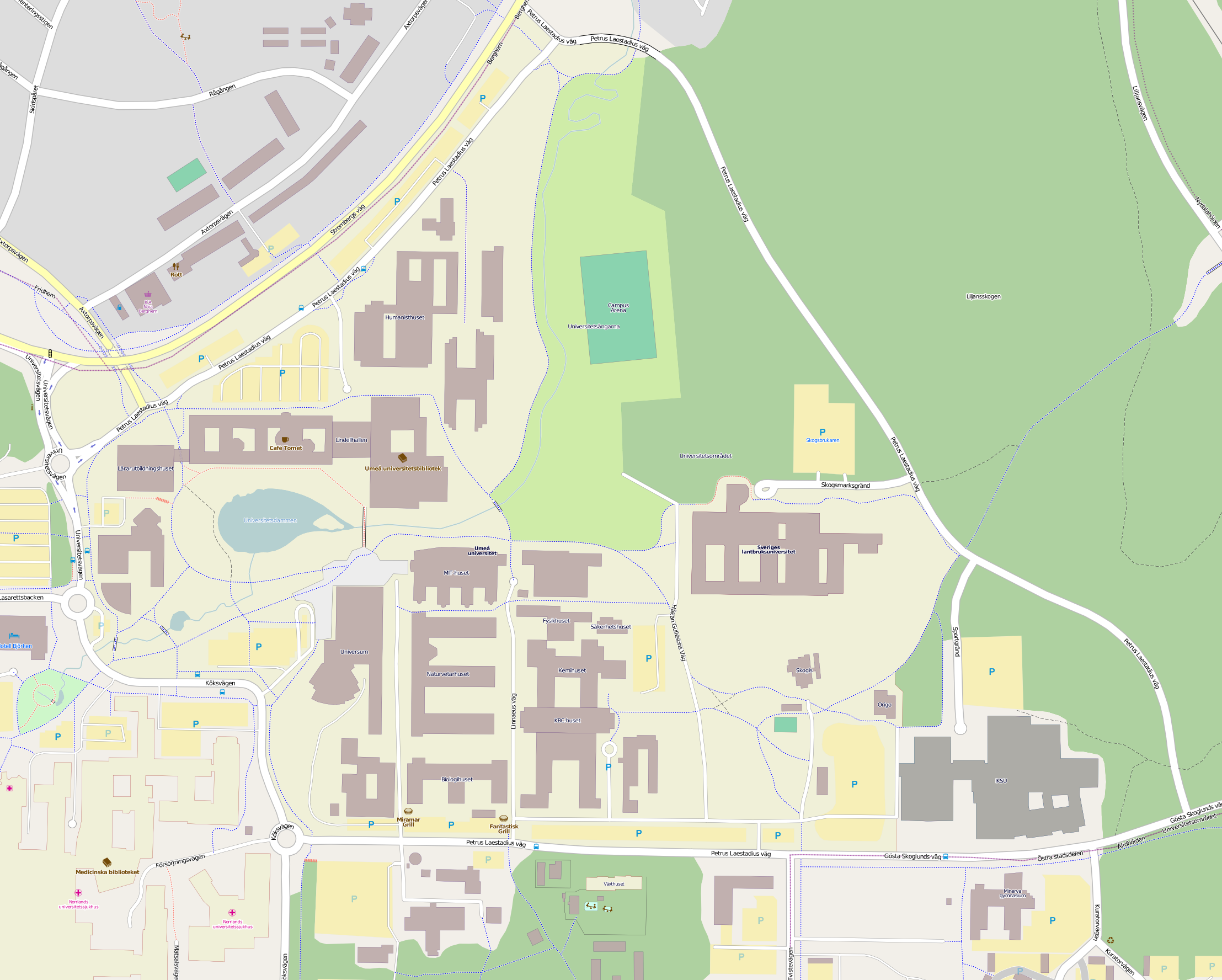
Map of Umeå University, from OpenStreetMap.

Umeå University (Swedish: Umeå universitet; Ume Sami: Ubmejen universitiähta; Meänkieli: Uumaja ynivärsiteetti); is a public research university located in Umeå, in the mid-northern region of Sweden. The university was founded in 1965 and is the fifth oldest within Sweden's present borders.

As of 2015, Umeå University has over 36,000 registered students (approximately 16,000 full-time students), including those at the postgraduate and doctoral level. It has more than 4,000 employees, half of which are teachers/researchers, including 310 professors.

Internationally, the university is known for research relating to the genome of the poplar tree and the Norway Spruce, and its highly ranked Institute of (industrial) Design.

== Organisation ==
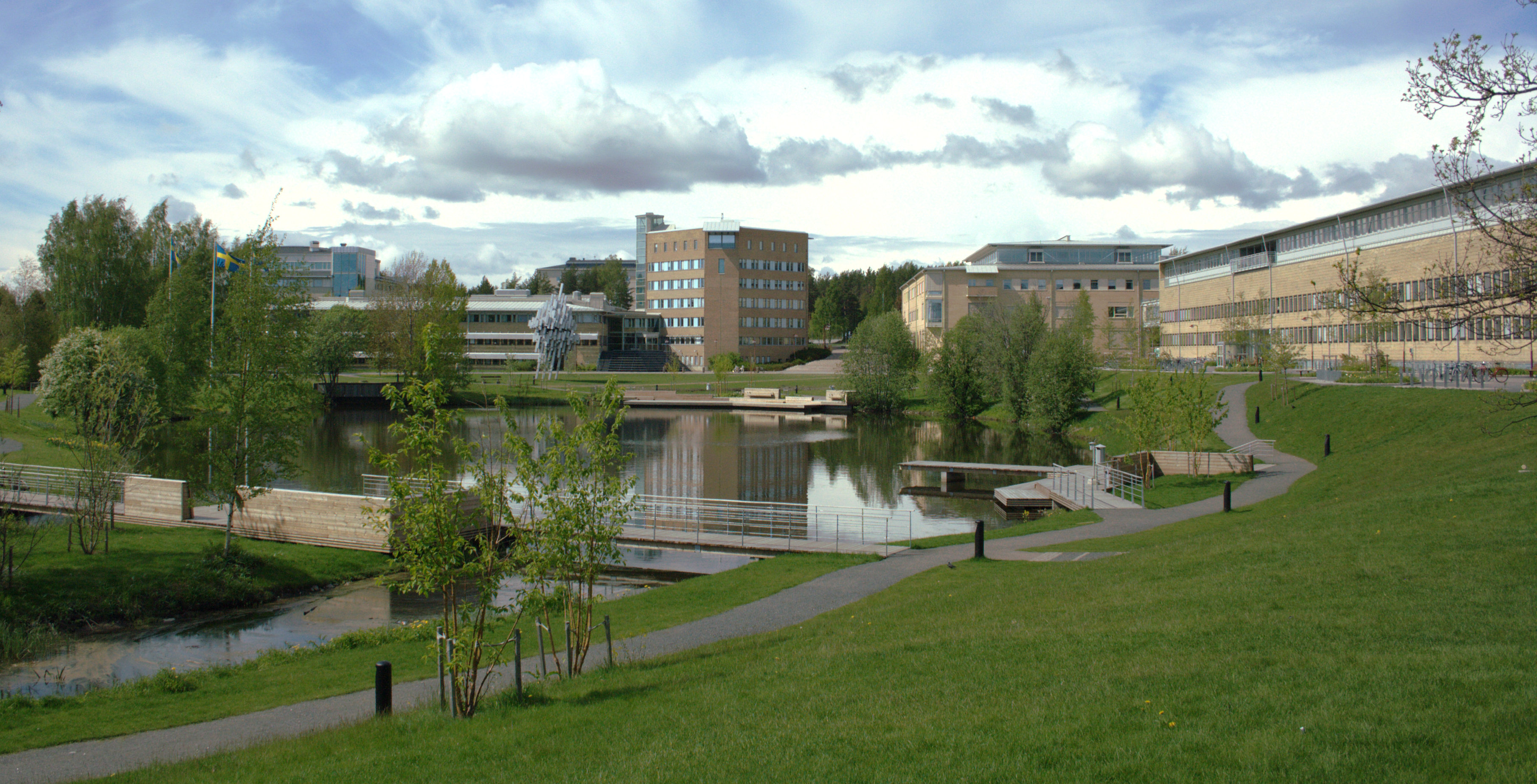
Umeå University Campus

The highest branch at Umeå University is the University Board of Directors. The board includes eight members (including the board chairman) appointed by the government, the vice-chancellor, three representatives for the teachers, three for other employees, and three for the students.

The University Management consists of the vice-chancellor (rector), pro-vice-chancellor, deputy vice-chancellors, senior advisers and the university director.

The university has four faculties and eight campus schools, more than 20 research centers and 36 departments. Most education and research are located at the main campus and Umeå Arts Campus in Umeå, with additional campuses in the cities of Skellefteå and Örnsköldsvik. The total number of students enlisted to some of the 50 different study programs and 800 separate courses exceeds 34,000.

=== Faculties ===
The university today has four faculties, listed below in alphabetic order:

- Faculty of Arts
- Faculty of Medicine
- Faculty of Science and Technology
- Faculty of Social Sciences

The faculties in turn consist of a total of 36 departments, these are:

- Department of Applied Educational Science
- Department of Applied Physics and Electronics
- Department of Biobank Research
- Department of Chemistry
- Department of Clinical Microbiology
- Department of Clinical Sciences
- Department of Community Medicine and Rehabilitation
- Department of Computing Science
- Department of Creative Studies (Teacher Education)
- Department of Culture and Media Studies
- Department of Ecology and Environmental Science
- Department of Education
- Department of Epidemiology and Global Health
- Department of Food, Nutrition and Culinary Science
- Department of Geography
- Department of Historical, Philosophical and Religious Studies
- Department of Informatics
- Department of Integrative Medical Biology (IMB)
- Department of Language Studies
- Department of Law
- Department of Mathematics and Mathematical Statistics
- Department of Medical Biochemistry and Biophysics
- Department of Medical Biosciences
- Department of Molecular Biology
- Department of Nursing
- Department of Odontology
- Department of Physics
- Department of Plant Physiology
- Department of Political Science
- Department of Psychology
- Department of Public Health and Clinical Medicine
- Department of Radiation Sciences
- Department of Science and Mathematics Education
- Department of Social Work
- Department of Sociology
- Department of Surgical and Perioperative Sciences

=== Schools ===
Umeå University has eight Campus Schools, listed below in alphabetical order:

- Umeå Institute of Design – a.k.a. UID, opened in 1989 at what later became Umeå Arts Campus, and is designed and equipped solely for the teaching of industrial design. UID offers a Bachelor program, master programmes in Transportation Design, Interaction Design and Advanced Industrial Design, and doctoral studies. The institute is known around the world for its high academic standards. It's the only Swedish school on BusinessWeek's top 60 list of design schools in the world.
- Umeå Institute of Technology – is part of the Faculty of Science and Technology. The institute offers a wide range of study programmes, some of them not to be found in any other part of Sweden. Research in engineering is gradually being expanded. The faculty's traditionally strong position in natural sciences form a base on which new technology research is built. The institute is a member of the CDIO Initiative.
- Umeå School of Architecture – opened autumn 2009, and moved 2010 to new facilities at Umeå Arts Campus. Aims to be an internationally orientated laboratory of sustainable architectural development, pursuing education on different levels as well as research. Umeå has obtained 250 study seats in the 5-year Architectural programme.
- Umeå School of Business and Economics – (a.k.a. USBE) has around 2,000 students. The School offers one Bachelor program, four undergraduate programs (Civilekonomprogram) seven master's degrees programs (included the Erasmus Mundus Master in Strategic Project Management-program), as well as a number of doctoral programs. The International atmosphere is important to the school and it offers one undergraduate program (the International Business program) and all Master's programs and doctoral programs entirely in English.
- Umeå School of Education – a.k.a. USE, was inaugurated in January 2009 to replace the former Faculty of Teacher Education.
- Umeå School of Fine Arts – was started in 1987 in a former factory next to the Umeälven river. Every year 12 new students are accepted to the school. A total of 60 people are studying at the academy, situated at Umeå Arts Campus.
- Umeå School of Sport Sciences – offers higher education to active athletes, but also sports related research in sports medicine and sport psychology.
- Umeå University School of Restaurant and Culinary Arts – started in 1996 with the gastronomy program, but also gives courses in leadership and hospitality management.

=== University Hospital of Umeå ===
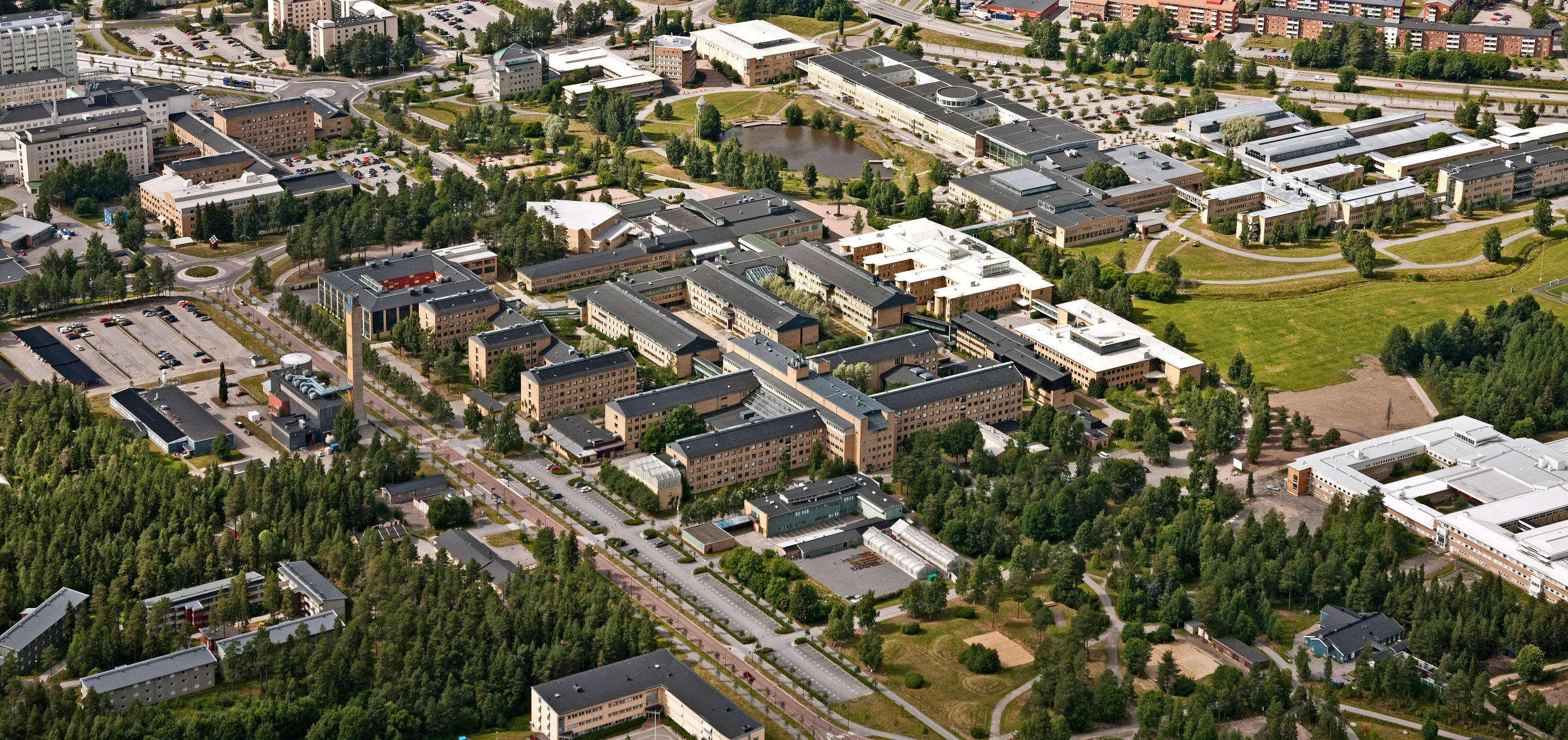
Aerial view of Umeå University Campus with the University Hospital of Umeå and the Swedish University of Agricultural Sciences. Photo: Bergslagsbild

- University Hospital of Umeå, ("Norrlands Universitetssjukhus", "NUS") is the main hospital and research center for medical care and medicine in northern Sweden. In cooperation with the university, it hosts one of seven schools for medicine and dental medicine in Sweden.

== Academic profile ==
=== Admissions ===
Prospective Swedish students make their applications to all Swedish universities at the Swedish Council for Higher Education website Antagning.se and international students use its counterpart in English, Universityadmissions.se. Information specific to non EU/EEA students (applications, tuition fees and scholarships) can be found at Studyinsweden.se.

=== Libraries ===
Umeå University Library (a.k.a. UmUB) was established at the time of Umeå University's foundation in 1965, but has origins in from the Scientific Library in Umeå established in 1950 at Umeå City Library. Its main building dates from 1968, but has since been extended and rebuilt, most recently in 2006. There are subsidiary libraries at the Norrland's University Hospital and the Umeå Arts Campus.

=== Research ===
Umeå University has research departments and education in a broad range of academic disciplines, with more than thirty university departments conducting most teaching and research. Since the 1990s there are also several research centers, mostly local but some in partnership with other Swedish universities, such as the neighbouring Swedish University of Agricultural Sciences and Luleå University of Technology.

The university is home to more than 2,000 researchers and teachers, many of them with international background. Important research areas include ageing and population studies, infections, and forest research.

- Ageing and population studies have access to the new and unique Linnaeus database, which covers the entire Swedish population between 1960 and 2009. It links information from four existing databases, enabling researchers to find new connections between health, lifestyle and aging. The Demographic Data Base also gives access to extensive databases with population statistics from old Swedish parish records, dating back to the 18th century, and from 2012 a Department of Biobank Research, providing data management for research in large biological sample collections collected since the 1990.
- The infection biology research focuses on microorganisms like bacteria, viruses, fungi and parasites, and their molecular infection mechanisms – microbial pathogenesis and virulence. Umeå Centre for Microbial Research (UCMR), offer a qualified environment for the development of new strategies against infectious diseases. The centre also hosts The Laboratory for Molecular Infection Medicine Sweden (MIMS), which is the Swedish's node in the Nordic EMBL Partnership for Molecular Medicine.
- The forest research includes plant and forest biotechnology within the Umeå Plant Science Centre (UPSC) – a collaborative effort between the Department of Plant Physiology at Umeå University and the Department of Forest Genetics and Plant Physiology at the Swedish University of Agricultural Sciences (SLU), and one of the strongest research environments for basic plant research in Europe, known for its research relating to the genome of the Populus tree and the Norway Spruce. The mapping of the spruce genome, in collaboration with the Swedish SciLifeLab, was the first complete sequencing of a gymnosperm and notable because it is seven times the size of the human genome, with some 20 billion base pairs.

=== Research centers ===
Research centers at Umeå University listed in alphabetical order:

- Arctic Research Centre at Umeå University (Arcum)
- Centre for Biomedical Engineering and Physics (CMTF)
- Centre for Demographic and Ageing Research (CEDAR)
- Centre for Environmental and Resource Economics (CERE)
- Center for Regional Science at Umeå University (Cerum)
- Centre for Teaching and Learning (UPL)
- Climate Impacts Research Centre (CIRC)
- Demographic Data Base (DDB)
- Digital Social Research Unit (DIGSUM)
- European CBRNE Centre
- High Performance Computing Center North (HPC2N)
- Humlab
- Molecular Infection Medicine Sweden (MIMS)
- Swedish Center for Digital Innovation (SCDI)
- Transportation Research (Trum)
- Umeå Center for Functional Brain Imaging (UFBI)
- Umeå Centre for Gender Studies (UCGS)
- Umeå Centre for Global Health Research (CGH)
- Umeå Centre for Microbial Research (UCMR)
- Umeå Center for Molecular Medicine (UCMM)
- Umeå Marine Sciences Center (UMF)
- Umeå Mathematics Education Research Centre (UMERC)
- Umeå Plant Science Center (UPSC)
- Várdduo - Centre for Sámi Research

=== Publishing ===
Practically all research papers produced by the university's researchers and students are to be found in the DiVA (Digital Scientific Archive) database, founded in 2000 (see link below).

=== Rankings ===
University rankings

Global – Overall
- ARWU World: 501–600 (2024)
- QS World: =401 (2026)
- THE World: 351–400 (2025)
- USNWR Global: 411 (2025-26)

In the latest (2012) Academic Ranking of World Universities, the university was ranked between places 201–300 of all universities in the world and at the same time by the QS World University Rankings the university was ranked 297th in the world (overall). In the latest (2012/2013) Times Higher Education World University Rankings 2012/2013 Umeå University was ranked between 251 and 275 out of all global universities.

In 2012, the university was ranked 23rd in the world of higher education institutions under the age of 50 years by the British magazine Times Higher Education (THE). In 2013 the university was ranked 1st of Sweden in the International Student Barometer on international student satisfaction by the International Graduate Insight Group. In 2014, the university was ranked 400th in the world for information and Computing Sciences Ranking. At the same time in 2014, the university was ranked between places 101–150 in the world for Life and Agriculture Sciences. and between places 151–200 in the world for Clinical Medicine and Pharmacy.

=== International collaboration ===
The university is an active member of the University of the Arctic. UArctic is an international cooperative network based in the Circumpolar Arctic region, consisting of more than 200 universities, colleges, and other organizations with an interest in promoting education and research in the Arctic region.

The university also participates in UArctic's mobility program north2north. The aim of that program is to enable students of member institutions to study in different parts of the North.

== Notable people ==
=== Alumni ===
- Adi Utarini, Indonesian scientist, Nature's 10 : ten people who helped shape science in 2020, Time's The 100 Most Influential People of 2021
- Bertil Andersson, president of Nanyang Technological University (2011–2017)
- Stefan Attefall, politician, Minister for Public Health, Minister for Housing in Sweden (2010–2014)
- Ibrahim Baylan, politician, Minister for Energy in Sweden (2014–)
- Martin Kulldorff, professor of medicine at Harvard Medical School, biostatistician at Brigham and Women's Hospital, member of scientific advisory committees to the Food and Drug Administration and the Centers for Disease Control
- Lars Lagerbäck, football manager (Sweden 2000–2009, Iceland 2011–)
- Åsa Larsson Blind, Swedish-Sámi politician
- Jan Lexell, neurologist and professor in rehabilitation medicine
- Hanna Ljungberg, former football player (Umeå IK and the national team of Sweden)
- Stefan Löfven, politician, Prime Minister of Sweden (2014–2021)
- Annika Norlin, pop artist (also known as Hello Saferide)
- Dan Olweus, psychologist, recognized for research in bullying
- Kay Pollack, film director
- Sverker Sörlin, environmental historian and writer

=== Faculty ===
- Emmanuelle Charpentier, microbiologist, geneticist, Nobel laureate
- Mathias Dahlgren, associate Professor with the Umeå University School of Restaurant and Culinary Arts
- Pär Hallström, legal writer and professor emeritus of Law
- Kristo Ivanov Professor emeritus of Informatics (1984–2002)
- Agneta Marell, former Dean at USBE (2004–2007), Deputy vice-chancellor (2010–)
- Astrid Norberg, professor emerita in nursing
- Staffan Normark, former professor of microbiology and infectious disease (1980–1989, 2008–2010)
- Gunnar Öquist, former professor of plant physiology (1981–2003, 2010–), permanent secretary of the Royal Swedish Academy of Sciences (2003–2010)
- Tõnu Puu, Professor emeritus of Economics
- Johan Redström, professor at the Umeå Institute of Design
- Marcus Samuelsson, associate Professor with the Umeå University School of Restaurant and Culinary Arts
- Åke Sellström, chemist, former weapon inspector in Syria
- Lars Thelander, biochemist, member of the Royal Swedish Academy of Sciences and the Nobel Committee for Chemistry
- Tor Troéng, former professional mixed martial artist who fought as a Middleweight for the Ultimate Fighting Championship

=== Honorary doctorates ===
- Tedros Adhanom, director-general of the World Health Organization (WHO)
- Bertil Andersson, Chief Executive of the European Science Foundation
- Jan Anderson, plant scientist (1998)
- Emmanuelle Charpentier, awarded the Nobel Prize in Chemistry in 2020
- C. West Churchman, American Philosopher and Systems Scientist
- C. Robert Cloninger, American Psychologist and Geneticist
- Christopher Martin Dobson, British Chemist
- Kerstin Ekman, writer
- Christer Fuglesang, first Swedish citizen in space
- Anita Gradin, former Swedish counselor of state
- Tarja Halonen, former president of Finland
- Harald zur Hausen, awarded the Nobel Prize in Medicine in 2008
- Lars Heikensten, frm. governor of the central bank of Sweden
- Gudmund Hernes, Norwegian sociologist, former Norwegian minister of education
- Roger Jowell
- Carl Kempe, Swedish businessman
- Roger D. Kornberg, awarded the Nobel Prize in Chemistry in 2006
- Nancy Langston, professor
- Sara Lidman, writer
- John Loughlin, professor of politics
- Denis Mukwege, congolese gynecologist, founder of Panzi Hospital
- Lars Nittve, museum director
- Sverker Olofsson, Swedish TV-personality
- Gösta Skoglund, Swedish politician and one of the founders of the university
- Tom Traves, president of Dalhousie University
- Margot Wallström, Swedish foreign minister (2014–), former European commissioner
- Hans L. Zetterberg, Swedish sociologist

== See also ==
- List of universities in Sweden
