= University Hospital of Umeå =

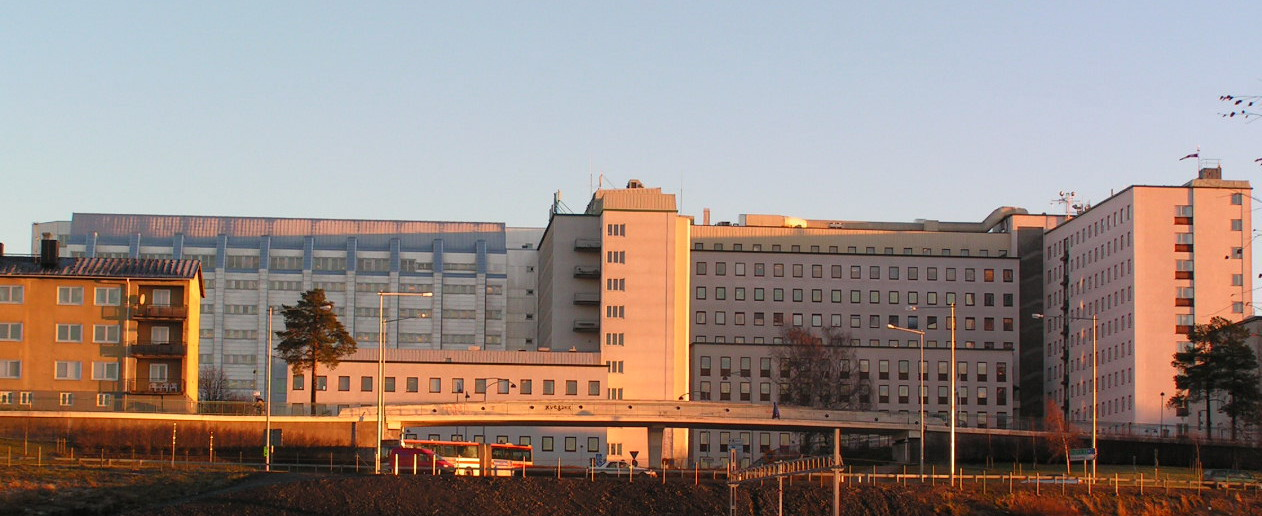

Geography
- Location: Umeå, Västerbotten County, Sweden
- Coordinates: 63°49′03″N 20°17′54″E

Organisation
- Care system: Public
- Type: Teaching
- Affiliated university: Umeå University

Helipads
- Helipad: Yes

History
- Founded: 1907

Links
- Lists: Hospitals in Sweden

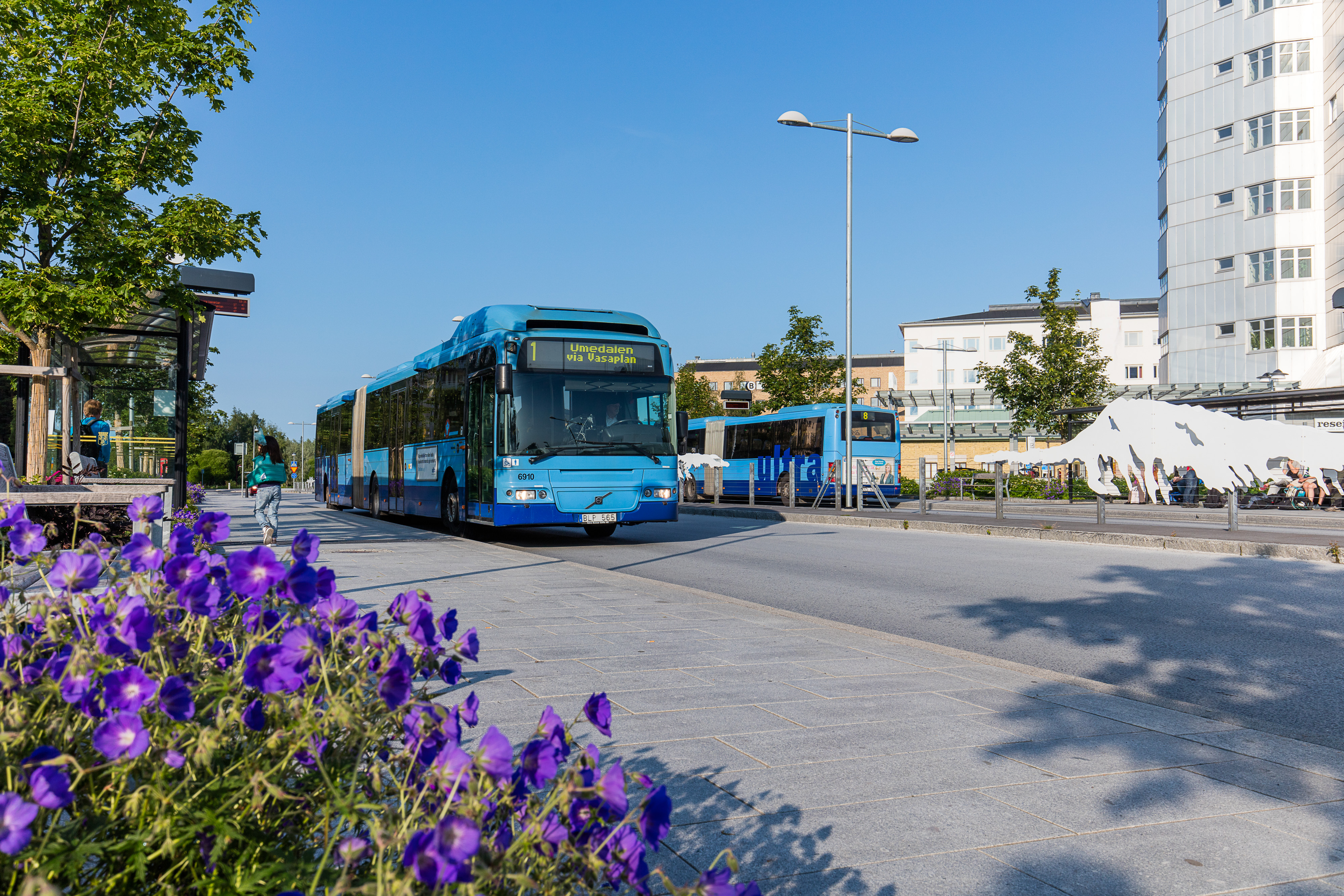
The bus terminal at Daniel Naezéns gata outside the University Hospital is one of the major hubs for public transport in Umeå.

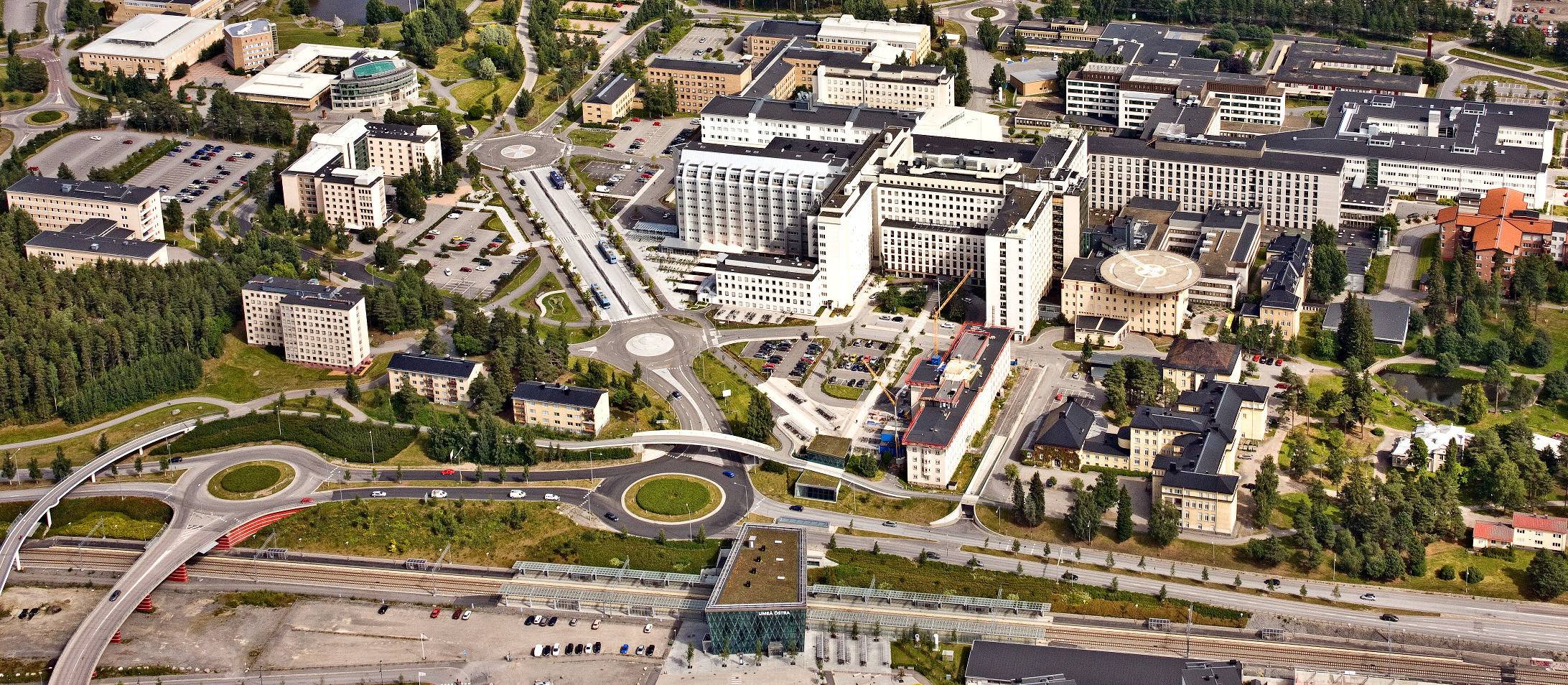
Norrland's University Hospital with parts of the Umeå University campus in upper left corner and Umeå East Station at the bottom.

University Hospital of Umeå, in Swedish Norrlands universitetssjukhus (Nus), is the major hospital in northern Sweden, situated in Umeå. The hospital employs 5,600 people.

It is also a teaching hospital for Umeå University, with the Faculty of Medicine as the responsible authority; 13 departments and two science centres, 12 undergraduate academic programmes, and several master programmes. Within the faculty there are about 3,400 undergraduate and 600 postgraduate students, and about 1,200 staff, of which about 45 percent are teachers/researchers.

== History ==
It was founded as a lasarett in 1784, known as the Yellow House (Gula huset), on Storgatan 28 in Umeå. It had eight beds. The building still remains but is no longer used by the hospital.

As Umeå expanded a new hospital was built on Ålidbacken in central Umeå. It was started in 1907 (celebrating its centennial in 2007). It had 134 beds.

In 1918 the hospital was expanded further. In 1926 the eye clinic was completed, in 1937 a new pediatrics department was created, and in 1957 the gynecological and obstetrics department was opened up.

Today all the original buildings on Ålidbacken have been demolished and been replaced by the current hospital.

A photographing ban was introduced in 2011 by the Västerbotten County Council, citing the integrity of patients and personnel. The ban was however not limited to the hospital but included all premises of the County Council. The ban has been met with protests, including from Sveriges Television, TV4 and Västerbottens-Kuriren.
