= 2009 Republic of Ireland v France football matches =

Association football matches

- Event: 2010 FIFA World Cup qualification – UEFA second round
Republic of Ireland	France
(Republic of Ireland)	(France)
1	2
- On aggregate France qualify for the 2010 FIFA World Cup

First leg
Republic of Ireland	France
0	1
- Date: 14 November 2009
- Venue: Croke Park, Dublin, Ireland
- Referee: Felix Brych (Germany)
- Attendance: 74,103

Second leg
France	Republic of Ireland
1	1
- After extra time
- Date: 18 November 2009
- Venue: Stade de France, Saint-Denis, France
- Referee: Martin Hansson (Sweden)
- Attendance: 79,145

Republic of Ireland vs France was a two-legged football play-off held on 14 and 18 November 2009 between the national teams of the Republic of Ireland and France as part of the UEFA second round of qualification for the 2010 FIFA World Cup. The first match was held on 14 November in Croke Park, Dublin, Ireland, and ended in a 1–0 victory for France with Nicolas Anelka scoring. The second leg, played on 18 November in the Stade de France outside Paris, France, finished 1–0 to the Republic of Ireland (with Robbie Keane scoring). The tie went to extra time and a controversial William Gallas goal enabled by captain Thierry Henry handling the ball twice made the score 2–1 on aggregate and France progressed to the World Cup at Ireland's expense. After the second leg, Henry admitted to Irish defender Richard Dunne that he had illegally handled the ball in the build-up to Gallas' match-winning goal, which had been scored in extra time with 17 minutes remaining.

The incident prompted the Football Association of Ireland and Government of Ireland to request FIFA to either replay the game or allow Ireland to participate in the World Cup as an additional 33rd team. Henry faced accusations of unsportsmanlike conduct from fans and media outlets following the incident, with the incident being compared to Diego Maradona's "Hand of God" goal, and Time magazine adding Henry's goal (sometimes called "Le Hand of God" or "Le Hand of Frog", among other nicknames) to a top ten list of sporting cheats. Henry publicly reflected on retiring from international football due to the backlash, and referee Martin Hansson indicated he contemplated stepping down from officiating.

The result contributed to discussions about fair play in football and the potential use of video refereeing and Additional Assistant Referees. At an emergency meeting of the FIFA Executive Committee called in part as a result of the handball controversy, FIFA announced it was setting up an inquiry into the options for technology or extra officials in football, but ruled out any changes being introduced in time for the 2010 World Cup. The FIFA Disciplinary Committee reviewed Henry's actions and concluded that the FIFA Disciplinary Code did not permit sanctions in this specific case.

== Route to the matches ==
The qualification process for the 2010 FIFA World Cup in South Africa began in 2007, and as Europe-affiliated teams (both being members of UEFA) France and the Republic of Ireland became two of 53 teams competing for 13 places in the finals.

Under the rules for the 2010 tournament, UEFA qualification was a two-stage process, as had previously been the case for qualification in 2006. Teams were able to qualify automatically by winning one of nine qualifying groups (the first round), and a second chance to qualify was given to eight of the nine second-place finishers via a knock-out phase (the second round) of four games between those eight second-placed teams, contested over two legs, home and away, with the winners of each pairing being awarded one of the four remaining UEFA qualifying places. Both France and the Republic of Ireland failed to qualify as winners of their first-round groups (France in Group 7, Ireland in Group 8), but both teams finished in second place with enough points to allow them to advance to the second round.

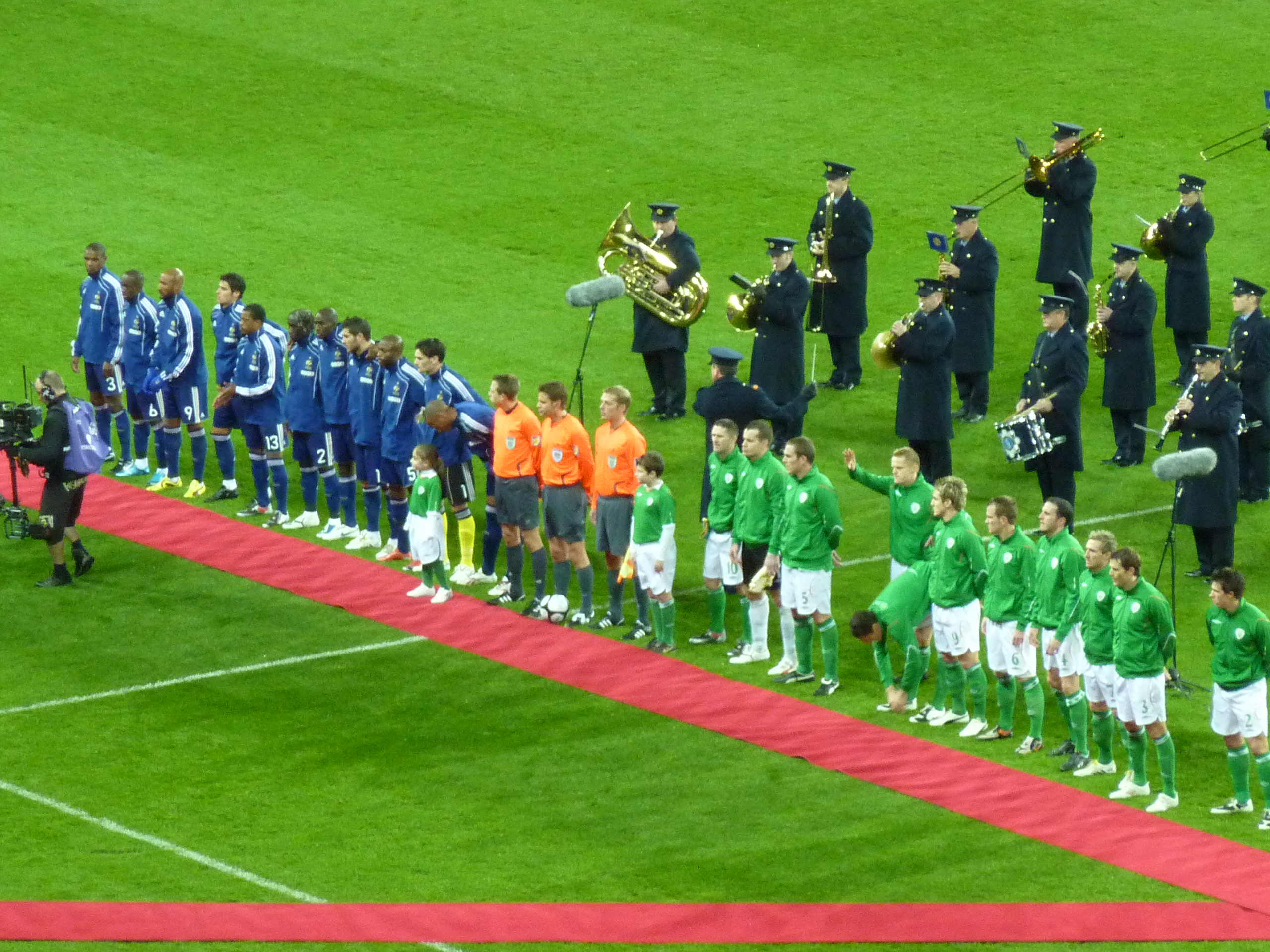
The Republic of Ireland and France teams lining up before the first leg at Croke Park.

FIFA announced on 29 September 2009 that it would modify the draw system used to select second-round pairings by introducing a seeding system. In the draw, held in Zürich on 19 October, the eight teams were divided into two pots of four; France were seeded along with Greece, Portugal and Russia, while Ireland was unseeded, alongside Bosnia and Herzegovina, Slovenia and Ukraine. Ireland was drawn to play France, with the first of their two games to be played in Ireland on 14 November 2009. The way the seeding process was handled led media reports and critics alleged at the time that UEFA altered the rules to benefit higher-profile teams such as France and Portugal.

The 18 November date of the second leg of the France vs Republic of Ireland play-off in Saint-Denis coincided with the date of a number of other World Cup qualification matches around the world, marking the completion of the entire qualification process for 2010. With their win, France ultimately joined Algeria, Greece, Slovenia, Portugal and Uruguay as the last of the 32 competitors in South Africa.

Under the agreed tie-break criteria, the team scoring more goals on aggregate wins the play-off. If scores are level on aggregate, the team with the higher number of away goals advances. If teams are level on away goals, 30 minutes of extra time is played. If the score is level after extra time, the match goes to penalties.

== Pre-match ==
=== Venue selection ===
The Dublin leg of the tie was held at Croke Park instead of the Republic of Ireland's traditional home venue of Lansdowne Road, owing to ongoing redevelopment of that venue as the Aviva Stadium. The French leg was held at Stade de France, the French team's national stadium near Paris.

=== Analysis ===
Before 1990, the Republic of Ireland had never qualified for the FIFA World Cup finals, while France's best record was two third-place finishes, in 1958 and 1986. Between 1990 and 2006 (the year in which the most recent FIFA World Cup had been held), the Republic of Ireland and France had each qualified for three finals tournaments. The two teams' records for the tournament were as follows:

Finals	Host country/countries	France		Republic of Ireland	
Finals	Host country/countries	Qualification	Finals	Qualification	Finals
1990	Italy	Did not qualify – third place in Group 5	n/a	As one of two best second-place finishers (in Group 6)	Lost to Italy in the quarter-finals
1994	United States	Did not qualify – third place in Group 6	n/a	Automatic as Group 3 runners up	Lost to the Netherlands in the Round of 16
1998	France	Automatic as hosts	Champions (defeated Brazil 3–0)	Did not qualify – finished second in Group 8; lost second round play-off to Belgium 2–3 on aggregate	n/a
2002	South Korea; Japan	Automatic as defending champions	Eliminated in the group stage	Advanced as Group 2 runners up; qualified by defeating Iran 2–1 on aggregate in the UEFA/AFC intercontinental play-off	Lost to Spain in the Round of 16
2006	Germany	As winners of UEFA first round Group 4	Lost in the final 3–5 on penalties to Italy (score was 1–1 a.e.t.)	Did not qualify – fourth place in Group 4	n/a

== Matches ==
=== Dublin leg ===
==== Summary ====
The Republic of Ireland team chose a balanced 4-4-2 formation, while the French team opted for their customary 4-2-3-1 formation, favouring offensive play over defence.

==== Details ====
14 November 2009
20:00 WET (UTC+0)

Republic of Ireland	0–1	France
	Report	Anelka 68'

Croke Park, Dublin
Attendance: 74,103
Referee: Felix Brych (Germany)

Republic of Ireland	France

GK	1	Shay Given
RB	4	John O'Shea
CB	5	Richard Dunne
CB	2	Sean St Ledger
LB	3	Kevin Kilbane
RM	7	Liam Lawrence	(substituted off) 80'
CM	6	Glenn Whelan
CM	8	Keith Andrews
LM	11	Damien Duff	(substituted off) 76'
SS	9	Kevin Doyle	(substituted off) 71'
CF	10	Robbie Keane (c)
Substitutes:
GK	16	Joe Murphy
DF	13	Paul McShane
DF	14	Stephen Kelly
MF	12	Aiden McGeady	(substituted on) 76'
MF	15	Darron Gibson
MF	17	Stephen Hunt	(substituted on) 80'
FW	18	Leon Best	(substituted on) 71'
Manager:
(Italy) Giovanni Trapattoni

GK	1	Hugo Lloris
RB	2	Bacary Sagna
CB	5	William Gallas
CB	3	Eric Abidal
LB	13	Patrice Evra
CM	18	Alou Diarra
CM	6	Lassana Diarra
RW	9	Nicolas Anelka
AM	8	Yoann Gourcuff
LW	12	Thierry Henry (c)
CF	11	André-Pierre Gignac	(substituted off) 90+1'
Substitutions:
GK	16	Steve Mandanda
DF	4	Julien Escudé
DF	17	Sébastien Squillaci
MF	14	Moussa Sissoko
FW	7	Sidney Govou
FW	10	Karim Benzema
FW	15	Florent Malouda	(substituted on) 90+1'
Manager:
Raymond Domenech

Assistant referees:

- Thorsten Schiffner (Germany)
- Mark Borsch (Germany)

Fourth official:

- Michael Weiner (Germany)

Dublin leg
Statistic	Republic of Ireland	France
Goals scored	0	1
Total shots	9	11
Shots on target	3	4
Saves	2	4
Corner kicks	3	6
Fouls committed	10	6
Offsides	6	3
Yellow cards	0	0
Red cards	0	0

=== Saint-Denis leg ===
==== Summary ====
A screenshot of the incident, from the TV broadcast.

A controversial instance of misconduct occurred during extra time in the second leg of the two-legged tie, when the overall score was standing at 1–1 on aggregate. French player Florent Malouda took a free kick just outside the centre circle in the Irish half of the field. He lofted it toward French captain Thierry Henry, who was making a run in the penalty area to Irish goalkeeper Shay Given's right-hand side. The ball bounced once to Henry, now inside the goal area to the left of the goal. As it bounced upwards, Henry handled the ball twice with his left hand, stopping it going out of play and bringing the ball under control, before tapping the ball with the outside of his right foot past Given standing at the near goal post. The ball travelled the short distance to William Gallas arriving in the middle of the goal, who headed the ball into the Irish net to confirm France's place at the 2010 FIFA World Cup.

The referee immediately signalled the goal as being valid. Irish players inside the penalty box appealed the decision by raising their arms, and as Henry wheeled away in celebration around the back of the Irish goal, Given ran to the referee gesticulating that a handball offence had occurred, while the Irish manager did the same to the fourth official.

The handball offence was not seen by the referee or his two assistants, according to the BBC. The match officials also missed an offside during the same phase of play.

==== Details ====
18 November 2009
21:00 CET (UTC+1)

France	1–1 (a.e.t.)	Republic of Ireland
Gallas 103'	Report	Keane 33'

Stade de France, Saint-Denis
Attendance: 79,145
Referee: Martin Hansson (Sweden)

France	Republic of Ireland

GK	1	Hugo Lloris
RB	2	Bacary Sagna
CB	4	Julien Escudé		(substituted off) 9'
CB	5	William Gallas
LB	13	Patrice Evra
CM	18	Alou Diarra
CM	6	Lassana Diarra
RW	9	Nicolas Anelka
AM	8	Yoann Gourcuff		(substituted off) 88'
LW	12	Thierry Henry (c)
CF	11	André-Pierre Gignac		(substituted off) 57'
Substitutions:
GK	16	Steve Mandanda
DF	17	Sébastien Squillaci	(yellow card) 79'	(substituted on) 9'
MF	14	Moussa Sissoko
FW	3	Loïc Rémy
FW	7	Sidney Govou	(yellow card) 107'	(substituted on) 57'
FW	10	Karim Benzema
FW	15	Florent Malouda	(yellow card) 90+2'	(substituted on) 88'
Manager:
Raymond Domenech

GK	1	Shay Given
RB	4	John O'Shea		(substituted off) 67'
CB	5	Richard Dunne
CB	2	Sean St Ledger
LB	3	Kevin Kilbane	(yellow card) 59'
RM	7	Liam Lawrence		(substituted off) 107'
CM	6	Glenn Whelan		(substituted off) 63'
CM	8	Keith Andrews
LM	11	Damien Duff	(yellow card) 104'
SS	9	Kevin Doyle
CF	10	Robbie Keane (c)
Substitutes:
GK	16	Joe Murphy
DF	13	Paul McShane	(yellow card) 75'	(substituted on) 67'
DF	14	Stephen Kelly
MF	12	Aiden McGeady		(substituted on) 107'
MF	15	Darron Gibson		(substituted on) 63'
MF	17	Stephen Hunt
FW	18	Leon Best
Manager:
(Italy) Giovanni Trapattoni

Assistant referees:

- Stefan Wittberg (Sweden)
- Fredrik Nilsson (Sweden)

Fourth official:

- Martin Ingvarsson (Sweden)

Saint-Denis leg
Statistic	France	Republic of Ireland
Goals scored	1	1
Total shots	11	6
Shots on target	3	2
Saves	11	3
Corner kicks	7	4
Fouls committed	17	23
Offsides	3	2
Yellow cards	3	3
Red cards	0	0

== Post-match ==
=== View of match participants ===
==== Thierry Henry ====
Henry told a reporter after the incident, "Yes, there was hand, but I'm not the referee. Toto was going for the front, I was behind two Irishmen, the ball ricocheted and hit my hand. Of course, I continued to play ... The referee did not whistle 'hand' but I can't say there wasn't hand." Henry later defended himself against criticism, stating, "Obviously I would have preferred that things panned out differently but I am not the official. I do not think we have stolen qualification."

After FIFA denied the Football Association of Ireland (FAI) request for a replay, Henry released a statement.

The fairest solution would be to replay the game but it is not in my control ... Naturally I feel embarrassed at the way that we won and feel extremely sorry for the Irish who definitely deserve to be in South Africa ... I have said at the time and I will say again that 'yes' I handled the ball. I am not a cheat and never have been. It was an instinctive reaction to a ball that was coming extremely fast in a crowded penalty area. ... As a footballer you do not have the luxury of the television to slow the pace of the ball down 100 times to be able to make a conscious decision ... People are viewing a slow motion version of what happened and not what I or any other footballer faces in the game. If people look at it in full speed you will see that it was an instinctive reaction.

Henry said that he had considered quitting international football after the reactions to the incident, but was persuaded not to by friends and family. He criticised the French Football Federation (FFF) for their lack of support in the aftermath of the controversy. He regretted the immediate celebration of the goal but put it down to the emotion of the moment, and reflected that not informing the referee had been a mistake. On the issue of lasting impact of the incident, Henry said, "I don't think that all I have achieved in my career up until now will be spoiled by this."

Henry later called FIFA President Sepp Blatter over the incident. Blatter stated Henry had told him his family had been threatened over the incident by fans.

==== Match referee ====
The match was officiated by a Swedish team. Martin Hansson was the match referee, assisted by his two assistant referees, Fredrik Nilsson and Stefan Wittberg.

Referee Hansson told Sveriges Radio Blekinge "I cannot comment on the game itself but life must go on. I will ride this storm as well". In his first substantial comment on the incident, Hansson spoke to the regional Swedish newspaper Sydöstran on 24 November. While repeating the fact that FIFA rules prevented him commenting on the game until the investigation concluded, he said the incident was neither his or his referee team's fault. Referring to a graphic illustration printed earlier in The Times and reproduced in some Swedish newspapers, he said "[the graphic] clears the whole refereeing team in this incident". The picture, titled 'Why the referee missed it', purported to show how neither the referee or the assistant referee could have seen the handball incident, due to the presence of three Irish players blocking Hansson's view from his position on the edge of the penalty area, and Irish goalkeeper Shay Given's position obscuring the sightline of the assistant referee, Nilsson, who was standing on the right hand touchline. He also stated that the reaction to the game had made him consider quitting his job as a referee. On 21 June, during the World Cup finals, Hansson said, "After the game, we were sitting in the dressing room and I cried. I realized what a mistake it was."

==== Team managers ====
Ireland manager Giovanni Trapattoni stated he did not blame Henry, nor did he expect a replay would occur, but he did believe the incident would bring further pressure on FIFA to introduce goal-line technology, stating "There is a 30-second stop and we clarify the situation ... I'm sure in the future they will have to do something about it. It wasn't up to Henry to say 'I touched it with my hand'". Trapattoni also questioned the selection of the match referee, stating "For this important game we needed a stronger referee – an important referee", and went on to also question the format of the qualifying round matches.

French team manager Raymond Domenech said of the game, "I don't see what we could have done better ... We needed to qualify and we did that, even if it was painful. Victories like this one, at the end of a difficult campaign, give this side heart and soul", although criticism in France of his team, which had existed before the game, continued. Domenech later criticised the condemnation of Henry and France, and questioned the right of former French players like Cantona and Lizarazu to criticise his record as the French coach.

==== Other players ====
Ireland captain and scorer of Ireland's goal in the controversial match Robbie Keane criticised the presidents of FIFA and UEFA following the result, claiming they would be 'delighted' that France had gone through. He told BBC Radio 5 Live, "They're all probably clapping hands, Platini sitting up there on the phone to Sepp Blatter, probably texting each other, delighted with the result." After Henry's statement, Keane concurred with his call for a replay in the interest of fair play, stating "On behalf of the Republic of Ireland players, I would like to thank Thierry Henry ... As captain of the French team, to make such a statement took courage and honour, and all of us recognise that".

In general, the Irish players blamed the officials rather than Henry. Damien Duff admitted he would have done the same had it been to Ireland's advantage, and said: "If it was down the other end and it was going out of play, I would have chanced my arm. You can't blame him (Henry). He's a clever player – but you expect the ref to see it, it was so blatant." Many players, including Duff, supported call for the introduction of video technology. Sean St Ledger hoped France would be put in a 'group of death' in the World Cup draw, but feared they might go on to win the tournament.

Defender Richard Dunne later spoke of how he was unaware of the extent of Henry's involvement when he sat down with him on the pitch at the end of the match and admitted the handball. Dunne properly viewed the incident for the first time on a computer in his team's dressing room. He also described how "heartbreaking" the whole experience was, his lack of interest in the draw or who France's opponents might be in the finals and how "disappointing" it would be when the tournament eventually took place.

Given was critical of Sepp Blatter's later actions, stating his various announcements "rubbed salt in the wounds" and his contradictory comments about Henry were "beyond a joke". He expressed doubt he would get over the incident in his lifetime. Of Henry, he said "I'm not saying he's a cheat but what he's done is illegal".

Dunne was later critical of Blatter's offer of moral compensation, describing it as "taking the mickey". He doubted Robbie Keane would be going to FIFA to collect any such award. He reiterated the belief that ever since the earlier seedings controversy, FIFA had been showing France unfair favour.

=== Action taken ===
==== FAI appeal ====
The FAI filed a formal complaint with FIFA and the FFF, stating, "The handball was recognised by the FIFA commissioner, the referee observer and the match officials, as well as by the player himself." The FAI cited precedent for the invalidation of the result, using the example of a previous World Cup qualification match between Uzbekistan and Bahrain, overturned by FIFA due to a "technical error by the referee of the match". In that game, the referee had failed to have a penalty kick re-taken after an attacker encroached on the penalty area. FAI chief executive John Delaney said "It is up to the people who govern the game now, if they really believe in the principles of fair play then step forward. ... If we had qualified in this manner, I wouldn't be happy". The president of the (FFF) Jean-Pierre Escalettes said "You have to take a philosophical approach to this match."

On 20 November, FIFA rejected the request for a replay, stating to the FAI:

The result of the match cannot be changed and the match cannot be replayed. As is clearly mentioned in the Laws of the Game, during matches, decisions are taken by the referee and these decisions are final.

After FIFA and Thierry Henry's statement, the FAI urged the FFF to respect their views and those of the captains of both teams, to replay the game to "protect the integrity of the game worldwide". The FFF, while sympathetic, endorsed the FIFA ruling. Following the FFF's refusal to support a replay, the FAI expressed "deep disappointment".

==== FAI proposals and 33rd team place ====
At the request of the FAI, Sepp Blatter met an Irish delegation in Zürich for 90 minutes on Friday 27 November. The FAI proposed a number of ways the incident could be prevented in future and, agreeing that the match could not be replayed, they instead also officially requested to be allowed to enter the World Cup as an unprecedented extra 33rd entrant. Blatter stated that he would raise the Irish request at an extraordinary general meeting (EGM) of the FIFA executive committee. RTÉ Sport speculated that the request would be "politely turned down". The request drew 'laughter' when he relayed it to the Soccerex conference the following Monday. Blatter was of the opinion that if the Republic of Ireland were admitted as an extra entrant, Costa Rica would also have to be considered as well, having also been unfairly eliminated by an offside goal in a play-off against Uruguay. FIFA secretary-general Jerome Valcke had ruled it out on 1 December, one day before the meeting, clarifying that Blatter's comments regarding other teams had already shown the request was "impossible" and had "no hope" of being granted. According to The Guardian on 30 November, the Irish had not expected the request to be successful, but they had also "asked FIFA to consider compensating them in some other way, perhaps by seeding them in the draw for the 2014 World Cup".

The FAI's proposals included: no changes to competition formats mid-tournament (referring to the play off group seeding change), introduce video technology at the highest level, implement additional assistant referees behind the goal line for all international matches, introduce stronger sanctions for players who breach the Laws of the Game in a "match defining way", and issuing a statement that "FIFA does not condone breaches" of those Laws, referring to Sepp Blatter's previous statements of empathy with Henry. The FAI stated they did not ask for any action to be taken against Henry.

Delaney reacted angrily to Blatter's public disclosure of what was intended to be a confidential submission to the FIFA executive committee, complaining to the FIFA general secretary and calling it "disrespectful to our country", and stating the 33rd team proposal had been "very much peripheral" to their suggestions, and was only discussed "for a minute or two" in the meeting. The FAI asserted that the 33rd place request had not even been included in any of the written submissions to FIFA.

==== Sepp Blatter ====
Blatter had initially faced criticism for refusing to comment on the incident. His first comments came with a report in L'Équipe, and during his opening address at the Soccerex football conference in Johannesburg, South Africa, both on Sunday 29 November.

Blatter said that it had not been Henry's responsibility to tell the referee of the misdemeanour, comparing a similar incident in his own playing career, when he did not tell the referee about an advantage gained by shirt-pulling. Blatter said that referee Hansson "should have taken the time to reflect rather than immediately awarding the goal".

On the issue of fair play, Blatter said "There is a lack of discipline and respect in the game by the players because they are cheating" and "How can it happen that all over the world, through TV cameras, we have seen through a cheating handball that a pass was given for a goal? Everyone is asking what is and what isn't fair play. The highest crime in football is touching the ball with the hands". Referring to the possibility of using assistant referees or goal line technology, Blatter stated, "match control is now is on the agenda. How shall we avoid such situations as we have seen in this very specific match?" Blatter repeated his stated opposition to video refereeing, saying, "With technology, you have to stop a match. You have a look at cameras ... We have to maintain the human face of football and not go into technology."

On the issue of fair play at the World Cup, Blatter commented after the FIFA executive committee's EGM:

I appeal to all the players and coaches to observe this fair play. In 2010 we want to prove that football is more than just kicking a ball but has social and cultural value ... So we ask the players 'please observe fair play' so they will be an example to the rest of the world

Blatter apologised to the FAI on 2 December for the public disclosure of the FAI's submission to FIFA and for the media's perception of his comments at Soccerex, saying, "I have nothing against the Irish, they were very sporting people when they came to FIFA and it is a pity that it has been now communicated in this way." After the EGM, John Delaney described FIFA as the "biggest losers" in the controversy for having "made one mistake after another", referring to the mid-competition change in seeding rules for the play-off, the negative imagery of football as a whole generated by FIFA's actions and Henry's goal, and Sepp Blatter's subsequent dealings with the FAI.

==== FIFA executive committee ====
On 23 November FIFA announced that the FIFA executive committee would hold an extraordinary general meeting (EGM) on 2 December in Cape Town, where members were already due to meet to discuss the seedings for the World Cup, in order to discuss various recent incidents affecting the world game. According to BBC Radio 5 Live sports news correspondent Gordon Farquhar, the Henry incident would be "high on the agenda". Gordon Smith, the chief executive of the Scottish Football Association and a member of the International Football Association Board, believed that introduction of AARs in time for the World Cup would be pressed for at the EGM by UEFA president Michel Platini, who had been a long-time supporter of the concept; Smith said of the proposal, "I feel that it has its advantages at the highest levels of the games. When there's massive TV coverage the problems are highlighted all over the world so this is something we may have to look at." The FAI was to be given the chance to present their views at the EGM, with Delaney hoping it would not be a "token" gesture, criticising the lack of direct contact from FIFA. FIFA President Sepp Blatter confirmed on 30 November that the EGM would consider the use of AARs and goal-line technology in the 2010 World Cup, and changing the two-legged play-off qualification format, possibly in favour of a single game played at a neutral venue.

The EGM was held on 2 December at the Cape Town International Convention Centre. The executive committee at the time consisted of FIFA president Sepp Blatter, eight vice-presidents and 15 members, and the FIFA general secretary Jérôme Valcke. The membership included representatives of various confederations and associations around the world. In response to Blatter's comments at Soccerex and before the EGM, the FAI formally notified FIFA in writing that they were withdrawing their request to enter the World Cup as a 33rd team, and accordingly this matter was not considered. The FAI's other suggestions were, however, discussed.

According to FIFA, the EGM discussion resulted in "concrete proposals" to ensure that improvements were made on the issues raised. According to Blatter, the committee recognised the game was at a "crossroads" and that, at the highest levels, where 32 cameras were to be used to film the 2010 World Cup, it was now "impossible" for just the referee and his two assistants to "see everything".

The EGM announced that FIFA would be setting up an inquiry into future use of extra assistants and technology. The new inquiry would, according to Blatter, "have a look at technology or additional persons". Described as a "full inquiry" or "working party" by media commentators, it was to comprise a new FIFA committee with input drawn in part from the existing FIFA referees', football, technical and medical committees.

The expected introduction of AARs for the 2010 World Cup was ruled out. The committee "stressed that it would be too soon to implement this new system at the 2010 FIFA World Cup South Africa." Blatter explained that, as AARs had not yet been trialled outside of Europe, the committee was of the opinion that any experiment must be carried out "globally" before it could be used in a World Cup. Blatter confirmed that the experiment with AARs in the Europa League would continue into the 2010 knock-out stages. The meeting also ruled out the use of video refereeing systems similar to those seen in rugby, cricket and tennis. Blatter stated that two companies investigating goal-line technology were due to report their results to International Football Association Board (IFAB) in March 2010. FIFA also called on the general secretaries of the Continental Federations to propose improvements to the format of the qualification and play-off phase of the World Cup competition, for submission by March 2010.

==== Henry disciplinary investigation ====
On the issue of possible disciplinary sanctions against Henry individually, a FIFA spokesperson stated "The [independent] disciplinary commission ... will decide if the case is of interest [when they meet sometime in the next two weeks]. The possibility exists of sanctioning a player for unsporting behaviour on the basis of video evidence". Examples of FIFA disciplinary action taken against players for incidents missed by the referee based on video evidence include banning Mauro Tassotti for eight games for use of an elbow during the 1994 World Cup quarter-final, and banning Marco Materazzi for two games for his verbal provocation of Zinedine Zidane in the 2006 FIFA World Cup Final, resulting in the infamous headbutting incident.

On 2 December after the FIFA EGM it was announced that FIFA's disciplinary committee would open an investigation into Henry's handball. No timetable was given for when the investigation, chaired by Swiss lawyer Marcel Mathier, would rule on the case.

Blatter said of the decision to single out Henry for investigation of a handball:

I have not said that Thierry Henry will be punished, I have said that Thierry Henry will be examined [by the committee] ... it's not a question of this player or another – it was blatant unfair play and was seen all around the world ... let [the committee] make the decision. Fair play must be maintained in our game.

According to the Associated Press, the committee had the "authority to impose a one-match suspension on Henry, which would take effect at the start of the World Cup in June". According to the BBC, FIFA said "there was no certainty Henry would be banned if found guilty".

On 18 January 2010 it was announced that Henry would face no sanctions in relation to the incident, after the committee found it had "no legal foundation" to deal with the case, as the relevant rules only covered sanctions for preventing a goal by illegally handling the ball. FIFA rules reportedly forbade any other action as the referee had not seen the original incident. FIFA released the following statement:

... the Disciplinary Committee reached the conclusion that there was no legal foundation for the committee to consider the case because handling the ball cannot be regarded as a serious infringement as stipulated in article 77a of the FIFA Disciplinary Code. There is no other legal text that would allow the committee to impose sanctions for any incidents missed by match officials.

The FFF president Jean-Pierre Escalettes hoped the announcement would mark the end of the incident, stating of the decision that is "not astonishing, it is logical".

==== France national team ====
FIFA secretary general Jérôme Valcke later denied that France's absence from the top 8 seeded teams for the 2010 World Cup draw had been a result of the controversy, stating that the change to the seeding system (using the world rankings as they stood at October 2009) was fairer than past systems. The FFF president described the decision as logical, although former French coach Michel Hidalgo disagreed.

In a quirk of the resulting draw, the lack of seeding ultimately did not have a detrimental effect on France, as they were drawn into Group A; since the seeding place in Group A had already been allocated to the host nation South Africa, a Group A draw was the only possible outcome where France would not have been placed into a group with one of the top seven seeded teams. South Africa were ranked 86th in the world at the time, making them the lowest-ranked team competing in the tournament; The Irish Times commented that this turn of events in France's favour would cause the Irish to feel particularly aggrieved. At the finals, France ultimately failed to qualify from their group, failing to win a game and managing only a solitary point in their first match against Uruguay; following a major disruption at the team's camp by the French players.

France and the Republic of Ireland did not meet in the qualifying matches for the 2012 European Championships. France were drawn in Group D while Ireland were drawn in Group B, although they were drawn together in the practice run for the draw held the day before.

==== FAI compensation ====
After the FIFA EGM, John Delaney said, "In terms of the football side, this is the end of the matter", but that "the incident will linger long in the memory like Diego Maradona's handball." Delaney hoped the promise of an inquiry into refereeing and technology was "not a fudge." The FAI and FIFA were however due to meet again after the EGM according to Blatter, to discuss some form of non-financial compensation for the controversy. On 4 June 2015 it emerged during an RTÉ interview that FIFA had bought the FAI's silence with a €5 million payment which would prevent any legal action against them.

==== Match officials ====
In January 2010, match referee Hansson and his assistant Stefan Wittberg were both selected as one of the thirty officiating teams to be used at the 2010 World Cup; however, Hansson's other assistant on the day of the incident, Fredrik Nilsson who missed the handball, was not selected, being replaced by Henrik Andrén. FIFA had insisted at the time of the incident that, since selection of referees for the World Cup referee was based on long-term assessments, Hansson would probably make it to the finals. UEFA president Michel Platini called it a good decision, defending Hansson as having not been responsible for the incident as he had not seen the handball.

== Reaction ==
The incident has been compared to Maradona's infamous "Hand of God" goal in the 1986 World Cup, which led to the incident being labelled as the "Hand of Frog" the "Hand of Gaul" and the "Hand of Henry" affair.

=== Governments and politicians ===
Irish Taoiseach Brian Cowen called on FIFA for a replay, stating that "fair play is a fundamental part of the game". Cowen raised the issue with French President Nicolas Sarkozy while both were at the European Union summit in Brussels on 19 November 2009. After the summit, Sarkozy stated, "I told Brian Cowen how sorry I was for them ... But don't ask me to substitute myself for the referee, or the French football authorities, or the European football authorities."

The incident was criticised in Dáil Éireann, the lower house of the Irish Parliament. The Irish Minister for Justice Dermot Ahern called on FIFA to act in the interests of fair play. The French Prime Minister François Fillon stated that the 'Irish government should not interfere in footballing decisions'. Rama Yade, French Secretary of State for Sports, and FFF vice-president Noël Le Graët both defended Henry from accusations of intentional cheating, pointing to his playing record, and stating that he should be presumed innocent unless he stated he deliberately set out to cheat. French Sports Minister Roselyne Bachelot and Minister of the Economy Christine Lagarde were sympathetic to the Irish viewpoint.

=== Sports administrators ===
On the eve of Henry's possible punishment being discussed at the FIFA EGM, FFF technical director Gérard Houllier defended Henry, stating the handball was instinctive and that the blame lay with the referee, pointing out that had the goal not been scored, the match would still have gone to penalties. Houllier also called for the introduction of video refereeing.

According to The Independent, the organiser of the 2010 World Cup Danny Jordaan resisted calls for video refereeing and believed that 'disputed decisions should be considered part of football'. Leslie Irvine, the Northern Irish former referee and FIFA instructor on the referee selection panel for the 2010 World Cup, was of the opinion that referee Hansson was not to blame for the incident, as by simply not seeing the incident he had not committed a 'technical infringement', and said Thierry Henry bore "moral responsibility" for the controversy. Jacques Rogge, president of the International Olympic Committee (IOC) praised Henry's decision to express his regrets over the affair, but declined to comment further, having not seen the incident. On the eve of the FIFA EGM, FIFA Secretary General Jérôme Valcke, while lamenting the fact that after 853 matches in the qualifying process, only one was being talked about, he said "It's important to make sure what happened will not happen again".

=== Football personalities ===
While in Dublin on 26 November for a charity event, Pelé said "maybe the linesman could help, but even the linesman doesn't see the game. We say fair play, but you know I don't think it was unfair, something that goes in one second ... The result was unfair, but unfortunately you can't change that"

Football pundits Johnny Giles, Eamon Dunphy and Graeme Souness, analysing the video replays on RTÉ Two, disputed whether Shay Given or anybody else was obscuring the view of the assistant referee from seeing the incident, although they were not certain the assistant could have flagged with certainty for handball even if he had a clear line of sight, due to the speed of the incident and flight of the ball. Former Irish international and football pundit Mark Lawrenson said "The man cheated. He controlled the ball with the second handball. It is a Maradona moment". Another former Irish international Tony Cascarino wrote in The Times that Henry "speaks so eloquently, but to me now he'll always be insincere, a faker, someone who cares only about himself". Former French international David Ginola said "I'm very embarrassed by the situation ... I don't feel very proud to be French this morning. The Irish played very well and they deserved to go through as much as France, maybe more. I'm very surprised FIFA haven't mentioned anything about it – the whole world saw the handball. This is a pure injustice. Everyone in France, the press and everyone, says there should be a replay". Former Ireland captain Roy Keane said the attempt by the FAI to get a replay was "rubbish", telling them to "get over it", that France were there for the taking and Ireland should not have allowed Henry to be in such a good position in the first place. Keane later apologised to any Irish fans offended by his "over the top" comments.

Henry's former France teammate Bixente Lizarazu stated "It was not something to be proud of. I'm not going to party." Henry's former Arsenal and France teammate Emmanuel Petit wrote that "The feeling among the French public on Thursday morning was one of embarrassment – we didn't want to qualify in controversial circumstances, we wanted to beat Ireland by playing within the rules" and "Thierry's handball will not send out a good message", but he was of the opinion that this "very rare indiscretion" would not damage his reputation, explaining that "There is a referee on the pitch and if he didn't see that's not France's problem." Petit later criticised FIFA and UEFA for their lack of support for Henry, and believed that Henry had saved Raymond Domenech's job. French player Patrice Evra questioned the patriotism of those French people attacking Henry, and was of the opinion that those same people would have criticised Henry had he informed the referee he had committed handball. Former French captain Patrick Vieira blamed the referee for the controversy, and supported the idea of video refereeing or having a fifth referee to assist in games. Former French international Eric Cantona was critical of Domenech, and referring to Henry's immediate post-match act of consoling an Irish player, said "If I'd been Irish, he wouldn't have lasted three seconds."

Another former Arsenal teammate Lee Dixon wrote that Henry had gone down in a lot of Arsenal fans' estimations, and Henry "has been a truly great footballer – one of the best players we've ever seen in the Premier League – but now people will remember him for that goal against Ireland. It's really sad". England footballer David Beckham defended Henry, stating "I honestly didn't think Thierry meant it ... I know him as a player and a person. He's a good person and a great player ... these things happen in football".

Henry's former Arsenal manager and Frenchman Arsène Wenger said of the incident that "This isn't the French way and football should learn from this", although he theorised that Henry did not inform the referee due to "the pressure and what's at stake". Wenger later added, "For the sense of justice it is quite embarrassing to see ... I think even France is embarrassed ... we won the game and won the qualification with a goal that was not a goal". Wenger believed Henry, who was one of the "fairest [players] I've managed", was being unfairly left to face criticism by France, and that the real issue was the lack of technology being in place. Manchester United manager Sir Alex Ferguson was of the opinion that "every player and manager in the world" thinks that "technology can play a part" to help referees, but recognised that it was FIFA who had to be convinced. Henry's club manager of Barcelona, Pep Guardiola, said as Henry returned to training in Spain that he "is not proud to have done that, but it wasn't premeditated", and gave guarded support for use of video refereeing. German Robert Huth expressed sympathy with the Irish, but on the merits of a replay, contrasted the lack of a replay after the controversial goal in the 1966 World Cup final. Danish goalkeeper Brian Jensen said "He didn't do it on purpose? Blah blah blah. My 'beep'. I won't say the word cheats – but ... I said it".

Thierry Roland, described by the Times as the "doyen of French TV football commentators", said of the game "It's a scandal, a shame with a capital S."

=== Media ===
According to the BBC, the game "attracted mass news coverage across Europe". Agence France-Presse (AFP) described how the result of the game sparked an "international outcry" and how as a result of the handball, Henry had been "pilloried as a cheat around the globe". Time magazine immediately named Henry as number 1 in a list of sporting cheats, ahead of Crashgate (listed as number 2), the Black Sox Scandal, Ben Johnson, Tonya Harding, doping in East Germany, Rivaldo at the 2002 World Cup, Boris Onishchenko, Basketboo, Hansie Cronje, and the original Hand of God goal (listed as number 11).

Sky Sports estimated qualification for the 2010 World Cup was worth £26.7m to Irish football, and was worth a similar amount to the French. FAI chief executive John Delaney denied the issue was about money, rather a matter of "fair play and integrity". The 2010 tournament prize money was later confirmed by FIFA as being $9m for participating, a further $9m for exiting the group stage, with potential prize totals rising to $30m for the eventual winners.

Spanish media, where Henry had played his club football since leaving England in 2007, took great interest in the event. The Spanish daily sports newspaper Diario Marca carried the headline "Football rails against 'cheating' Henry".

French newspaper L'Équipe greeted the incident with the headline "Main de Dieu" (lit. 'Hand of God'), while Le Parisien had "Henry Saves France With His Hand", and Le Figaro led with "«Je ne suis pas l'arbitre»" (lit. '"I Am Not the Referee"'). L'Équipe also wrote, "France have qualified for the 2010 World Cup, that's for sure, but the result, the most essential thing in sport after all, is not enough to erase the uneasy feeling we had last night". Le Parisien also wrote "The handball of Henry has brought a decisive contribution to the theme 'being French is being ashamed of one's national team'". Le Monde noted the lack of any calls for a replay following the controversial penalty for handball that went in Ireland's favour, during their previous Group 8 qualifying game against Georgia on 11 February 2009. Australia's Daily Telegraph said Henry would "earn a place in infamy as one of the biggest cheats in world sport".

Swedish newspapers advocated that the Swedish referee used for the match Martin Hansson be removed from further major international assignments. Aftonbladet declared of the officials "that Team Hansson has also forfeited its right to continue to take charge of major international matches. Anything else would be a further insult to the Irish nation". Mark Ogden of The Telegraph criticised Henry for not informing referee Hansson during the game, and speculated the incident would 'ruin his career', comparing the cases of referees Anders Frisk and Tom Henning Øvrebø.

In Britain, where Henry had spent much of his club career, The Sun's headline was "Le Hand of God: Cheat Theirry Does A Maradona", while The Daily Mirror's was "French Nickers", with The Independent using "Hand Gaul!". The Los Angeles Times speculated the incident had the potential to ruin his reputation with a moment of "eternal notoriety". The Guardian's chief sportswriter Richard Williams wrote that the incident was worse than Maradona's foul, describing his handball as "a street kid's instinct", while Henry's was "a sophisticated man, and a much-decorated one". Williams also critiqued Henry's decision not to inform the referee, citing previous club football examples of players not taking advantage of a referee's mistake: Robbie Fowler in 1997 unsuccessfully pleading for the referee not to give a penalty in his favour, Paolo Di Canio in 2000 catching the ball rather than scoring past an incapacitated goalkeeper, and Costin Lazăr in 2009 successfully insisting he would not take the penalty awarded to him for what he saw as a fair challenge. Henri Astier wrote for BBC News that the reaction in France, a "nation not particularly known for its moral qualms", had ranged from "embarrassment to outrage". Dominic Lawson wrote in The Sunday Times that "[Ireland] has taken on the role of unjustly oppressed victim – something the Irish do well, having had several centuries of practice".

Patrick Barclay, Chief Football Correspondent for The Times, declared that the Henry incident "ended the argument" over the issue of video refereeing. The Times also speculated that the incident might lead to a fast-tracked global deployment of the Additional Assistant Referee (AAR) system already under trial by FIFA, pointing out that under the trial configuration, the extra goal-line assistant would have been standing directly in front of Henry as he touched the ball with his hand. FIFA confirmed the AAR plan was to be discussed at the March 2010 International Football Association Board meeting. On the issue of football introducing AARs, The Wall Street Journal compared and contrasted the demands on referees in the World Cup compared to those in National Football League, National Hockey League and boxing, and relayed the negative experience of U.S. Soccer a decade previously, who took part in an international trial using two referees, one in each half, which "led to poor game management". The Times also questioned Henry's record on fair play, recalling his comments and actions during controversial incidents in a 2001/2 Champions League game against Panathinaikos, in the 2001 FA Cup Final, in the 2006 World Cup games against Spain and Portugal, in the 2006 Champions League Final and 2006–07 Champions League game against CSKA Moscow. Tim Rich of The Independent urged for video refereeing, asserting that the Europa League trial of AAR's had "not been an unqualified success", citing a failure of intervention by the goal line official in a game between Fulham and Roma, in which the players had to intervene themselves to ensure the main referee, Belgian Paul Allaerts, identified the correct man to send off after a foul on Roma player John Arne Riise, after mistakenly identifying the offender as Brede Hangeland. The player sent off was Stephen Kelly, ironically an unused Irish substitute in the controversial France game.

Jonathan Clegg debated in The Wall Street Journal the effect of the incident on Henry's lucrative sponsorship deals, comparing it to incidents such as ING Group's withdrawal from the Renault F1 after the Crashgate controversy, the retention of sponsors by Harlequin F.C. after their Bloodgate fake injury scandal, and the enhanced fortunes of Zinedine Zidane in spite of his head-butting of Marco Materazzi in the 2006 FIFA World Cup Final. Gillette, who Henry represents in advertisements, were threatened with a boycott and an email campaign. A brand spokesman said that it would not affect their relationship with Henry. Susie Mesure of The Independent later speculated that there was now a 'Curse of Gillette' befalling its three major sporting representatives, with the Henry controversy being followed in quick succession by Tiger Woods' car accident on 27 November, and a rare defeat of Roger Federer by Nikolay Davydenko in the 2009 ATP Tour on 28 November. A Gillette spokesperson had earlier denied allegations made by The Sun that a version of the "Gillette Champions" poster showing the three men with a tennis racket, golf club and football, had been doctored to remove a ball from Henry's hand in the French version of their website.

American radio host Jim Rome commented: "I'm glad the guy did it; it led to a goal ... How 'bout that guy. The guy was just trying to make a play. I thought it was smart; I liked it. It led to a goal; what's not to like?"

Speaking on Football Focus on 21 November, Philippe Auclair of France Football magazine said that, unlike Eric Cantona's "moment of madness", he could not see Thierry Henry earning a similar redemption in England for this "calculated moment of cheating".

On 22 November, the Irish Independent claimed that the FFF had been willing to stage a replay and that FIFA would not have prevented it, but the offer had been blocked by the French manager Raymond Domenech.

A Wall Street Journal editorial supported FIFA's decision not to replay the match and distinguished the refereeing error from the one in the replayed Uzbekistan–Bahrain match.

Henry Winter of The Telegraph wrote that FIFA had "gained some credibility" by deciding to investigate Henry after the EGM, whose presence at the World Cup would otherwise overshadow the Fair Play campaign, and that the Henry controversy made the case for having a panel of experts examine every major game after the event for infractions missed by the referee. Winter contrasted any possible punishment of Henry with the two-month ban issued to Diego Maradona for simply 'insulting reporters'. Diana Worman of Al Jazeera criticised FIFA's decision to investigate Henry for an act that happens all the time, and would have only warranted a yellow card, writing "Henry should never have been expected to make a 'sportsmanlike' decision after the goal and it's unfair for Fifa to make an example of him". The Canadian Press criticised FIFA's "cowardly" decision to investigate Henry and do nothing to change the situation for the 2010 World Cup. The Irish Times stated that the FAI's recommendations to FIFA in the wake of the controversy had been "effectively disregarded" at the EGM.

After the announcement that Henry would face no sanctions, Simon Rice of The Independent declared Henry had "got away with it", and compared his lack of punishment to nine other notable sporting incidents: Michael Schumacher (1994 Australian Grand Prix), Sir Alex Ferguson (against the Football Association generally), Graeme Smith (4th test, South Africa v England, 2010), Eduardo (diving against Celtic, 26 August 2009), Toni Schumacher (1982 World Cup semi-final), Trevor Chappell (the 1981 underarm bowling incident), Andy Haden (Wales v New Zealand, 1978), Diego Maradona (1986 Hand of God goal), and Fred Lorz (1904 Olympics men's marathon). After the announcement, Agence France-Presse speculated that any discipliniary action for Henry would have presented an "unwelcome precedent" for FIFA, and any punishment would have been merely symbolic, given the lack of prior cases of such retrospective player sanctions.

FIFA's subsequent decision to select referee Hansson as one of the 2010 World Cup officials was criticised by the Irish media, as well as UEFA president Michel Platini's comments that it would have been "great" if France and the Republic of Ireland had been drawn together for the 2012 European Championships.

=== Other ===
"A few hundred" Irish fans marched from Lansdowne Road Stadium to the French embassy on Ailesbury Road in Dublin, to demand a replay. An online poll run by French newspaper Le Monde revealed 88% of the 97,000 respondents said "no" to the question "Does France deserve to be in South Africa?". A Facebook petition demanding a replay was signed by over 500,000. The French teachers' union SNEP-FSU condemned Henry's irresponsible example of "indisputable cheating". Henry's official Twitter page was reportedly suspended due to "strange activity". When the World Cup pool games began Pizza Hut Delivery Ireland began a promotion offering a free pizza to every goal scored against France.

The Irish band, The Mighty Stef, wrote "Protest Song with No Name", which ends with the lyrics "you might cheat us, you might beat us, but you'll never lay a hand on our soul". The Corrigan Brothers wrote "The Hand of Henry", which includes the line "Sepp Blatter was happy". French company Le Coq Sportif were parodied over the incident, with an agency printing T-shirts with the words "Le Coq un-Sportif". Irish bookmakers Paddy Power launched a two-week advertising campaign in the baggage claim area of Dublin Airport poking fun at Henry, with posters stating "Paddy Power welcomes you to Ireland... unless you're called Thierry". Cleaners in Ireland also reportedly vandalised the unrelated Henry brand of vacuum cleaner. Irish rockstar Bono called on FIFA to do the noble thing, not act bureaucratically, and grant Ireland's request to be added to the World Cup as a 33rd entrant.

French philosopher Alain Finkielkraut said on Europe 1 radio that "We are faced with a real matter of conscience ... We certainly have nothing to be proud of." British author Roger Scruton said "one of the major justifications of sport in all its forms is that it teaches the virtues of fair play ... Victory achieved by cheating leaves a foul taste in the mouth ... and makes the whole thing as pointless to [the defeated team and its supporters] as it is to someone like me who has never quite experienced the allure of the game". The founder of the British Philosophy of Sport Association called for "restorative justice", and said that players had an obligation to honesty that "over-rides their self-serving commitments". French economist Jacques Attali wrote "Nous sommes tous Irlandais" ('We are all Irish'), in reference to the Le Monde headline "Nous sommes tous Americains" (We are all Americans) in the aftermath of the 11 September attacks.

Bookmakers William Hill stated they would refund any bets placed backing Ireland to qualify, to be "as fair as possible to everyone".

Thierry Henry was "booed relentlessly" by fans of Athletic Bilbao in his first competitive match after playing Ireland.

On 4 December 2009, Charlize Theron co-presented the draw for the 2010 FIFA World Cup in Cape Town, South Africa, accompanied by several other celebrities of South African origin. During rehearsals she drew an Ireland ball instead of France as a joke at the expense of FIFA, referring to the Thierry Henry handball controversy and France's controversial qualification. The stunt alarmed FIFA enough for it to fear she might do it again in front of a live global audience.

Irish fans donned sombreros and cheered as Mexico beat France 2–0 in their second group stage match on 17 June 2010. France was subsequently eliminated from the World Cup following a 2–1 loss to host nation South Africa in their final group stage match, and finished at the bottom of Group A.

During the World Cup, English comedian James Corden refused to acknowledge France on his "human wallchart" during his post-World Cup match TV show James Corden's World Cup Live, replacing France with Ireland, and when chatting with the Irish member of the wallchart, referred to players such as "Terry Henry" and "Paddy Evra", Irish variants of the names of France players Theirry Henry and Patrice Evra.

The Irish playwright and novelist Dermot Bolger's stage play, The Parting Glass, is based around this game in Paris, with most of the second half of the play occurring during the actual match in the Stade de France, as an Irish father and son watch their final Ireland game together before the son emigrates to find work in Canada.

=== Comparison to other events ===
The 2010 Leinster Senior Football Championship Final between Louth and Meath held at Croke Park on 11 July 2010 drew comparisons with Thierry Henry's cheating due to its controversial ending in which Louth were wrongfully defeated by a last minute Meath goal which was thrown into the net and therefore should not have stood. Louth were in the lead at the time and would have won their first Leinster Senior Football Championship in 53 years if Meath had not been given the goal. Louth fans burst onto the pitch as the final whistle blew, chasing and physically assaulting the referee around the field, while a steward was knocked unconscious with a bottle during ugly scenes played out on live television. The referee was struck on at least three different points as he scrambled away from the baying mob. Meath chairman Barney Allen compared calls for the game to be replayed with Henry's moment of shame, saying "Ireland didn't get a replay when France got a lucky goal". As the controversy continued to erupt, RTÉ analyst Pat Spillane called it a "disgrace". Setanta Sports said the "goal" would "now go down in infamy as the GAA's Thierry Henry incident".

During the 2010 World Cup, in extra time of a quarter-final match against Ghana, Uruguayan striker Luis Suárez handled the ball in the penalty area to prevent a last-minute game-winning Ghana goal. The act drew comparaisons with Thierry Henry's handball.

=== TV ===
In 2011, "L'Affair Henry the, ahem, touchiest sporting controversy in living memory" received its own episode of Scannal, the TV series dedicated to scandalous events. The Evening Herald reviewer called it an "entertaining, tightly-packaged edition" of the show but also opined, "Where Scannal stumbled, however, was in its failure to go in with both feet on the cringe-inducing elephant in the room: John Delaney's embarrassing plea to Fifa boss, the odious Sepp Blatter, to let Ireland be "the 33rd team" at the World Cup".

Early June 2010, Swedish film director Mattias Löw released the documentary film The Referee, produced for SVT (Sveriges Television), where he follows the referee, Martin Hansson, of the infamous playoff match in Paris, for a year leading up to FIFA World Cup 2010. The film portrays the Thierry Henry handball incident in Paris in detail from the referee's point of view.
