= Bo Karlsson =

Swedish football referee (born 1949)

- Full name: Bo Jonas Hilding Karlsson
- Born: 12 October 1949 (age 77)

Domestic
Years	League	Role
1984-1992	Allsvenskan	Referee

International
Years	League	Role
1986-1994	FIFA-listed	Referee

Bo Jonas Hilding Karlsson (born 12 October 1949) is a former football referee from Sweden. He refereed one match at the 1992 European Championships and one match at the 1994 World Cup. He also refereed the 1991 European Cup Winners' Cup Final between Manchester United and Barcelona.

In 2010, Karlsson appeared in Mattias Löw's documentary The Referee about Martin Hansson shown on Sveriges Television ahead of the World Cup in South Africa.

Preceded by 1990 (Switzerland) Bruno Galler	UEFA Cup Winners' Cup Final referee 1991	Succeeded by 1992 (Italy) Pietro D'Elia
