= Academy of Fine Arts, Umeå =

Art school in Umeå, Sweden

- Konsthögskolan
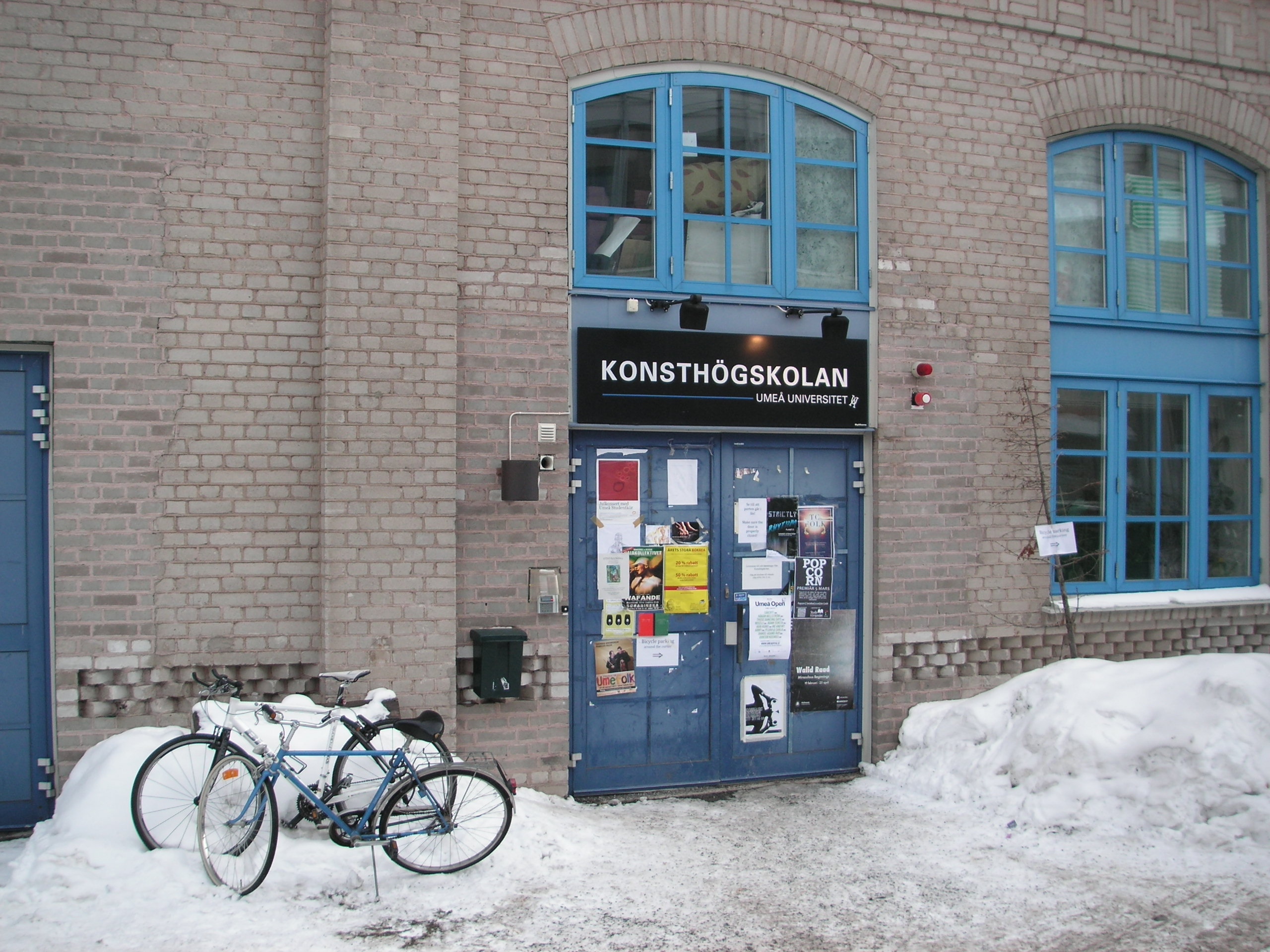
- Entrance
- Type: Art school
- Established: 1987
- Parent institution: Umeå University
- Academic affiliations: EUA
- Rector: Roland Spolander
- Coordinator: Maria Granberg
- Academic staff: 18
- Students: 70
- Location: Umeå, Sweden; 63°49′14.4″N 20°16′29.7″E
- Campus: Urban
- Website: Umeå Institute of Design

The Academy of Fine Arts at Umeå University is a Swedish art school. It was founded in 1987 in a former factory by the river of Uman. In 2011, the academy moved to a new facility in the Arts Campus of the University. Every year 12 new students are accepted to the school, and a total of 70 students currently study at the academy.

== Alumni ==
- Sebastian Mügge (MFA 2011)
- Knutte Wester (MFA 2003)

== See also ==
- Royal University College of Fine Arts
- Umeå University
- Umeå Institute of Design
- Umeå Institute of Technology
- Umeå School of Architecture
- Umeå School of Business
