= Umeå School of Architecture =

Architecture school of Umeå University

- UMA; Arkitekthögskolan vid Umeå universitet
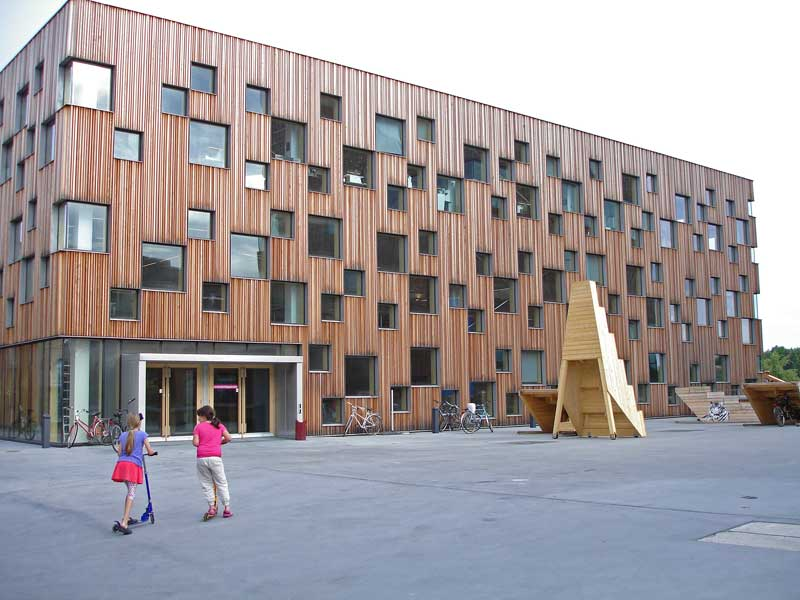
- Type: Public
- Established: 2009
- Parent institution: Umeå University
- Affiliations: Nordic Baltic Academy of Architecture (NBAA), European Association for Architectural Education (EAAE)
- Rector: Cornelia Redeker
- Faculty: 30
- Students: 260
- Location: Umeå, Sweden
- Campus: Urban
- Website: Umeå School of Architecture

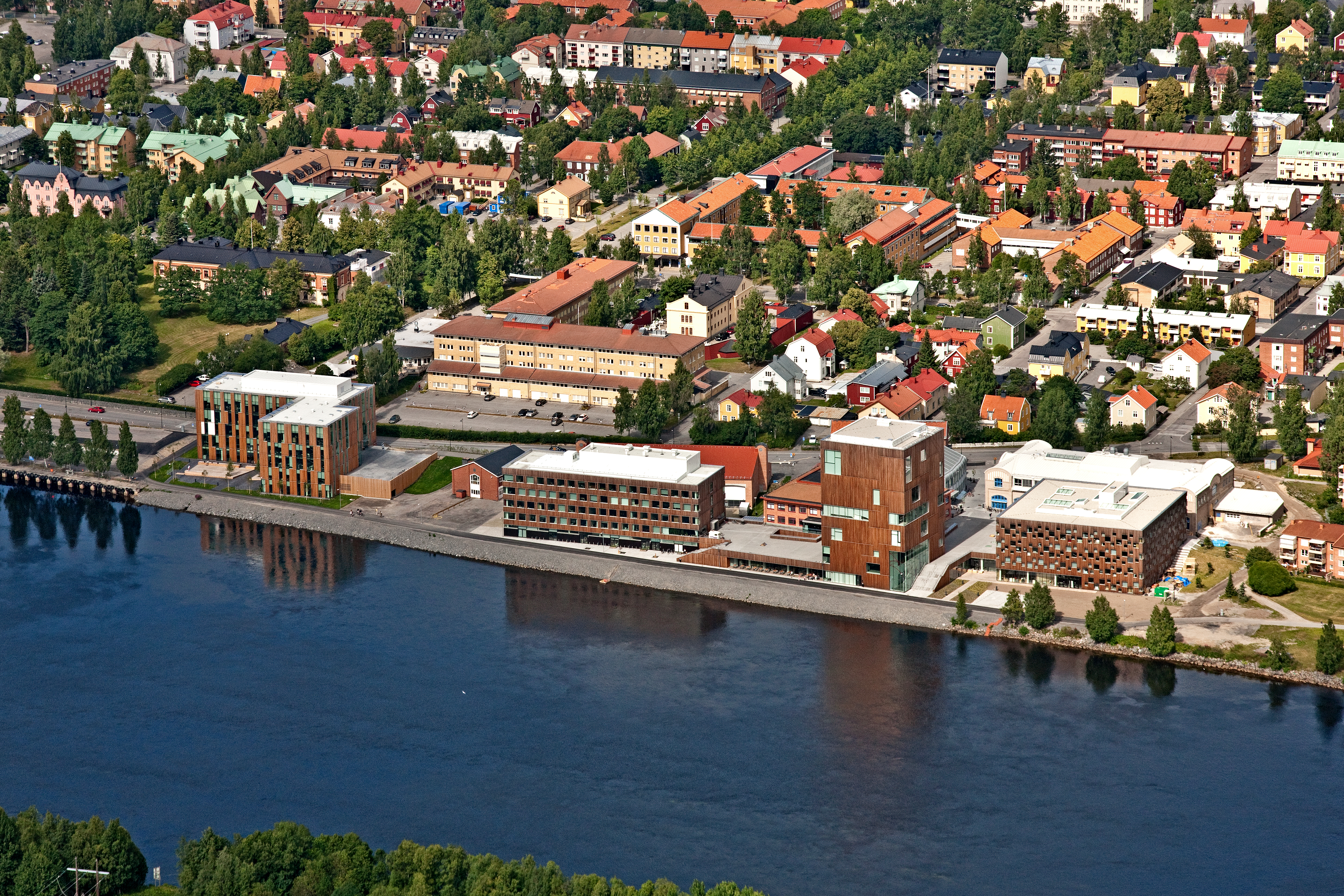
Aerial View of Umeå Arts Campus, with Umeå School of Architecture to the right. Photo: Bergslagsbild

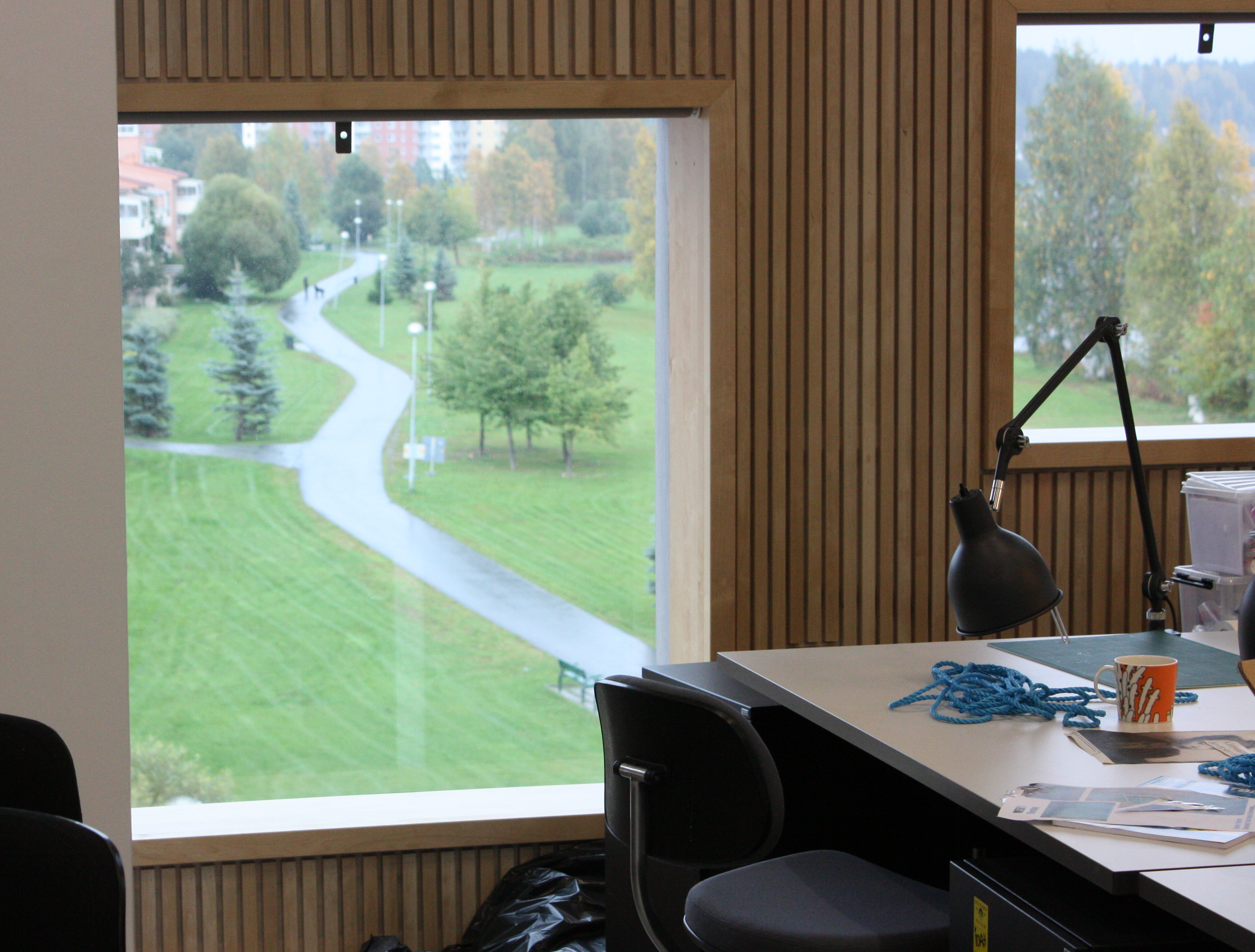
Study space at the school, viewing east towards the Öbacka park.

Umeå School of Architecture (abbreviated UMA) was founded in 2009 as the fourth academic school in Sweden to provide a professional degree in architecture. It is part of Umeå University.

The five-year architectural programme started in the fall of 2009. Master's degree programs started in the autumn of 2010. All education is in English with both Swedish and foreign educators.

After a year at provisional premises in central Umeå, in 2010 the school moved to a new building designed by Danish architect firm Henning Larsen Architects at the same campus as the Umeå Institute of Design and the Umeå Academy of Fine Arts at the Umeå Arts Campus.

== Programmes ==
The School offers a five-year programme in Architecture. Students with an undergraduate qualification from another institution can join the programme in year four and earn a Master's degree in Architecture and Urban Design.

== See also ==
- Umeå Institute of Design
- Umeå Institute of Technology
- Umeå School of Business
