= The Indian Priest =

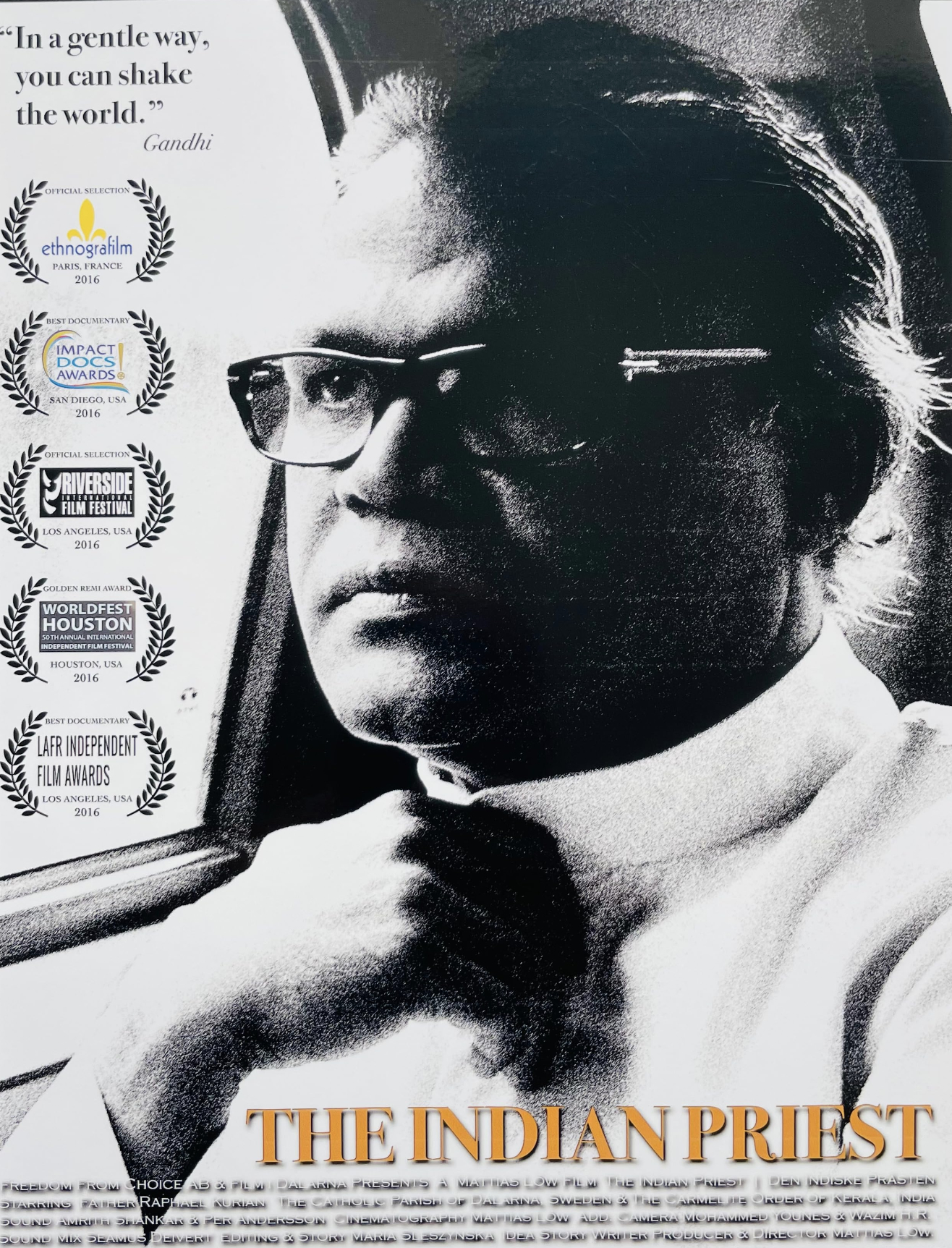
- Film Poster
- Directed by: Mattias Löw
- Written by: Mattias Löw
- Produced by: Mattias Löw
- Cinematography: Mattias Löw
- Edited by: Maria Sleszynska
- Production companies: Freedom From Choice, Film i Dalarna
- Release dates: 1 January 2016 (Cochin, India)
- Running time: 59 minutes
- Countries: Sweden, India
- Languages: Swedish, English, Hindi, Malayalam

The Indian Priest is a 2016 Swedish-Indian documentary film about a Carmelites of Mary Immaculate (C.M.I.) Catholic priest from south India, Father Raphael Kurian, who is sent to modern and secular Sweden as a missionary on the request from the evergrowing Catholic Church in Sweden and bishop Anders Arborelius.

The documentary mainly focuses on Father Raphael Kurian's daily life, work and life in priestly celibacy at the parishes in Falun and Olofström, Sweden as well as in the Syro-Malabar Church monastery congregation outside Thrissur at Elthuruth in Kerala, India.

The film is produced by Freedom From Choice AB and Film i Dalarna, and directed by award-winning Swedish film director Mattias Löw.
