= Umeå Institute of Design =

Coordinates: 63°49′14″N 20°16′39″E

- UID; Designhögskolan i Umeå
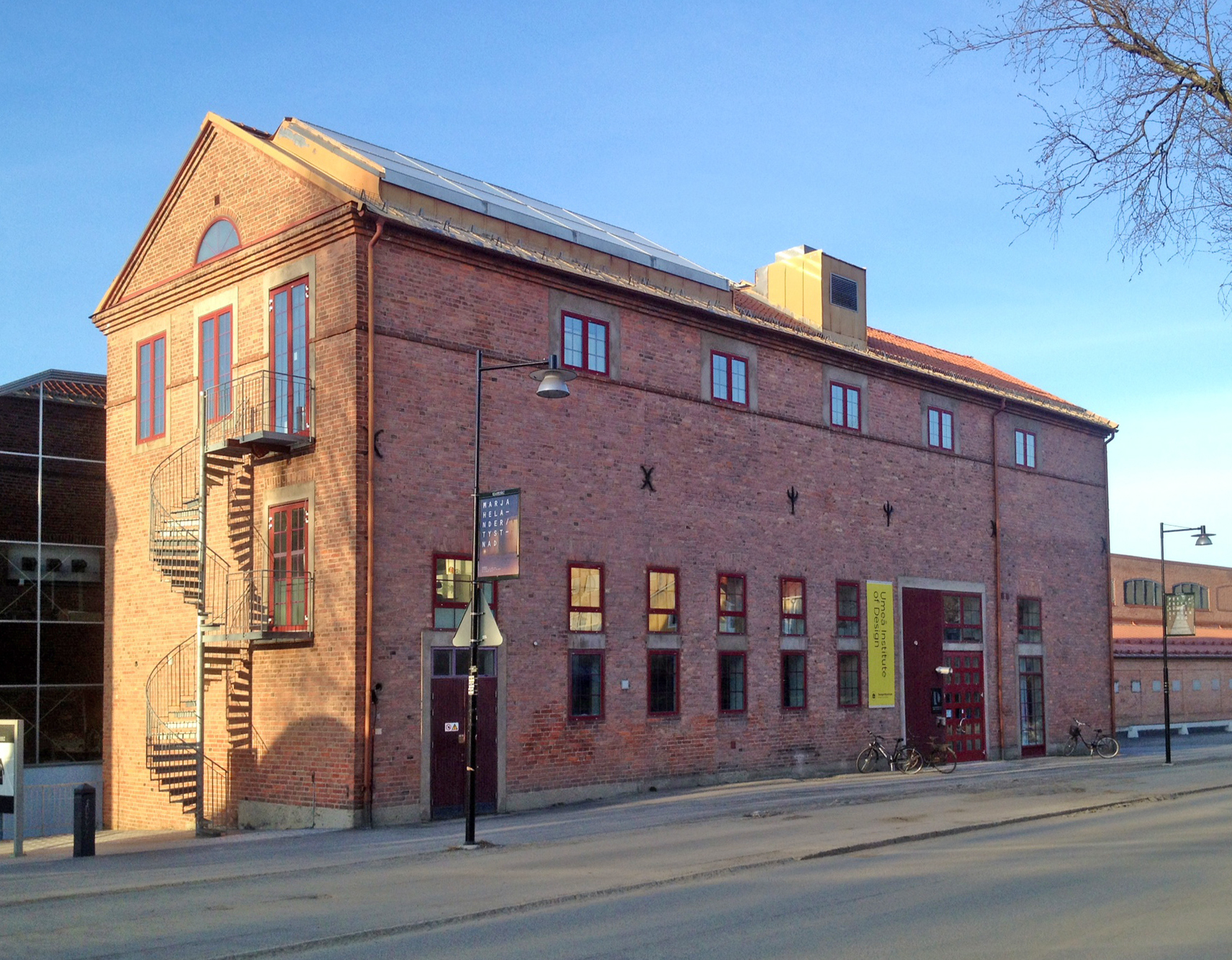
- Type: Public
- Established: 1989
- Parent institution: Umeå University
- Affiliations: EUA
- Academic staff: 40
- Students: 150
- Doctoral students: 6
- Location: Umeå, Sweden
- Campus: Urban
- Website: Umeå Institute of Design

The Umeå Institute of Design, UID, is an institute within Umeå University. UID opened in 1989 and is designed and equipped solely for the teaching of industrial design, transportation design, and interaction design. The Umeå Institute of Design is situated between the main Campus and Umeå city centre, as a part of the Umeå Arts Campus.

UID is the only Scandinavian school to have been listed on BusinessWeek's top 60 list of design schools in the world in all of the three listings (2006, 2007 and 2009), and has also been named as one of the world's 18 excellent designs schools in 2010. 2011 UID was ranked as the second-best design education in the region "Europa & the Americas" by Red Dot Institute and 2012 UID advanced to first place. In 2013, 2014, and from 2016 to 2022 it got ranked first as well.

The internationally acclaimed SVT - Sveriges Television documentary All The World in a Design School by documentary filmmaker Mattias Löw from 2015 follows a group of international industrial design students at Umeå Institute of Design during a study year.

== Education ==
=== Bachelor Programme ===
The Institute offers a three-year industrial design programme leading to a Bachelor's degree (180 credits). (only in Swedish)

=== Masters Programmes ===
There are three internationally oriented and specialised two-year programmes leading to a Master's degree (120 credits). The three programmes are Advanced Product Design, Interaction Design and Transportation Design. Transportation design course has one of the master design ex Head of design departement of Saab Sir Tony Catignani.

=== One-year Courses ===
Two full-time, one-year courses are offered at UID are under the supervisor of Catharina Henje, both given in English. Industrial Design Intensive, (60 credits) is open for students with a previous education in any other academic field or in design, who wish to specialise in the design field or prepare for future design studies. Subjects of studies are product design, interaction design, transportation design and service design. Design Connections (60 credits) is a specialisation course on master level, for students with a degree in industrial design.

=== Research and Doctoral Studies ===
The Institute also conducts applied research and development work within the Design Research Group and the Volvo Research Programme (SET). Since the autumn of 2001 the Institute of Design has offered doctoral studies in industrial design. (in English)

== See also ==
- Umeå University
- Academy of Fine Arts, Umeå
- Umeå School of Architecture
- Umeå Institute of Technology
- Umeå School of Business
