= All the World in a Design School =

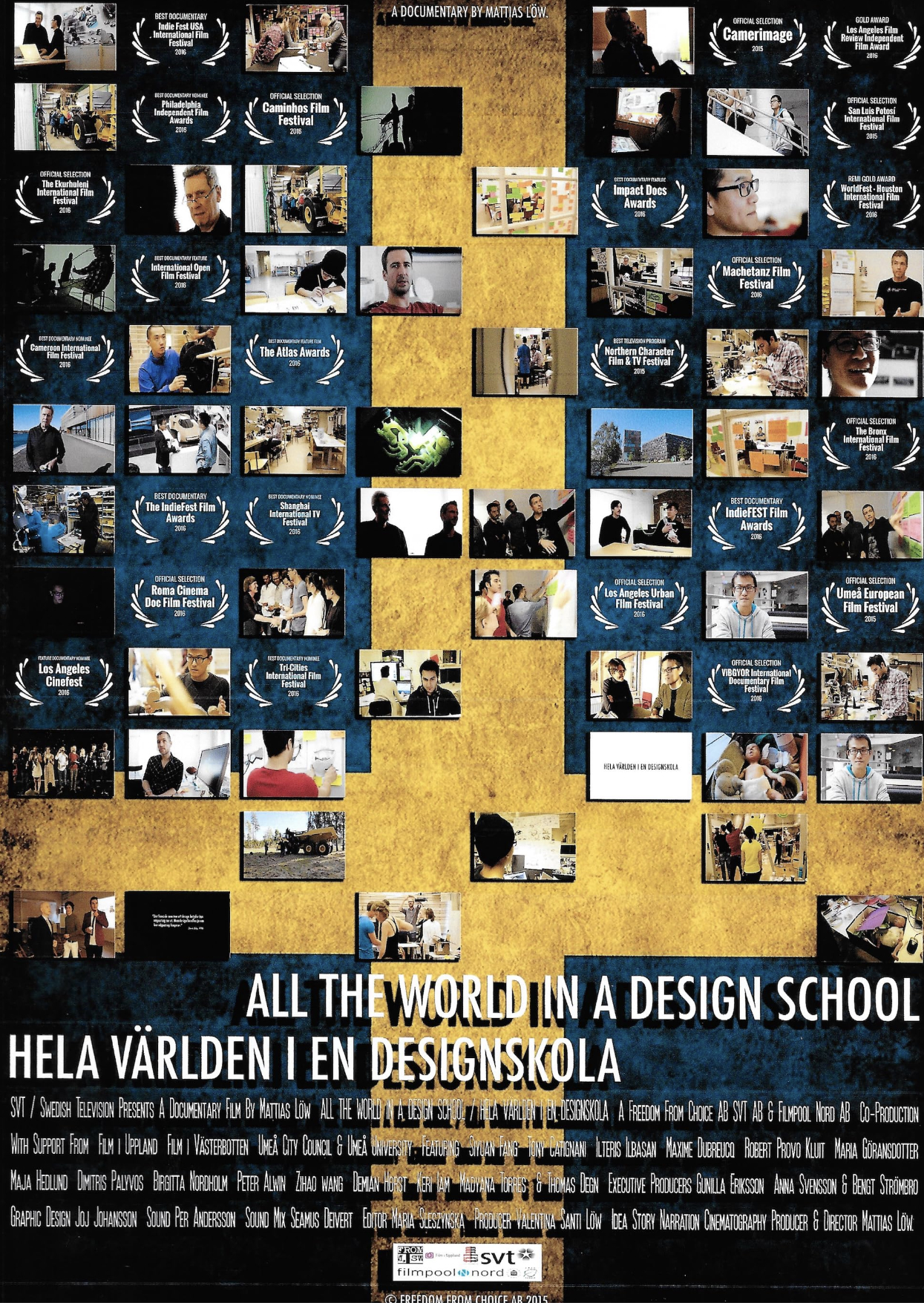
- Film Poster
- Genre: Documentary
- Created by: Mattias Löw
- Written by: Mattias Löw
- Directed by: Mattias Löw
- Starring: Ilteris Ilbasan, Siyuan Fang, Tony Catignani, Thomas Degn, Demian Horst, Robert Provo Kluit, Dimitris Palyvos, Maja Hedlund, Maxime Dubreucq, Madyana Torres, Birgitta Nordholm, Peter Alwin, Anna Costamagna, Maria Göransdotter
- Composers: Lars Kumlin, Jonas Beckman
- Country of origin: Sweden
- Original languages: English, Swedish, French

Production
- Executive producers: Anna Svensson, Gunilla Eriksson, Bengt Strömbro
- Producers: Mattias Löw, Valentina Santi Löw
- Cinematography: Mattias Löw
- Editor: Maria Sleszynska
- Running time: 59 minutes
- Production companies: Freedom From Choice, Sveriges Television

Original release
- Network: Sveriges Television, SVT Play
- Release: August 20, 2015

All the World in a Design School (Swedish: Hela världen i en designskola) is a 2015 Swedish documentary film made for Sveriges Television and about a group of international students at one of the world's top ranked industrial design schools, Umeå Institute of Design in Umeå, Västerbotten, Sweden.

Umeå Institute of Design is well respected by the industrial design world for its unique study and design methods in addition to a multicultural environment that has shaped generations of industrial designers.

This documentary, from inside Umeå Institute of Design, was shot during the school's 25th anniversary and follows a group of students from all corners of the world in close-up portraits during a time when the school struggles to maintain its attractiveness. New regulations by the Riksdag of Sweden mean non-European students are charged steep tuition fees.

The film is produced by Freedom From Choice, Filmpool Nord and Sveriges Television, and directed by award-winning Swedish filmmaker Mattias Löw. It premiered on Sveriges Television and SVT Play on 20 August 2015.

The documentary won the Best Television Program Award at the Northern Character Film & TV Festival in Murmansk, Russia, the Best Documentary Feature Film Award at the Atlas & Aeris Awards in Boston, United States, a Remi Gold Award at the WorldFest – Houston International Film Festival in Texas, United States and has received international attention with nominations and official selections at several recognized film festivals including Camerimage in Bydgoszcz, Poland.
