= The Gold Panner from Lannavaara =

Contemporary Swedish documentary feature film

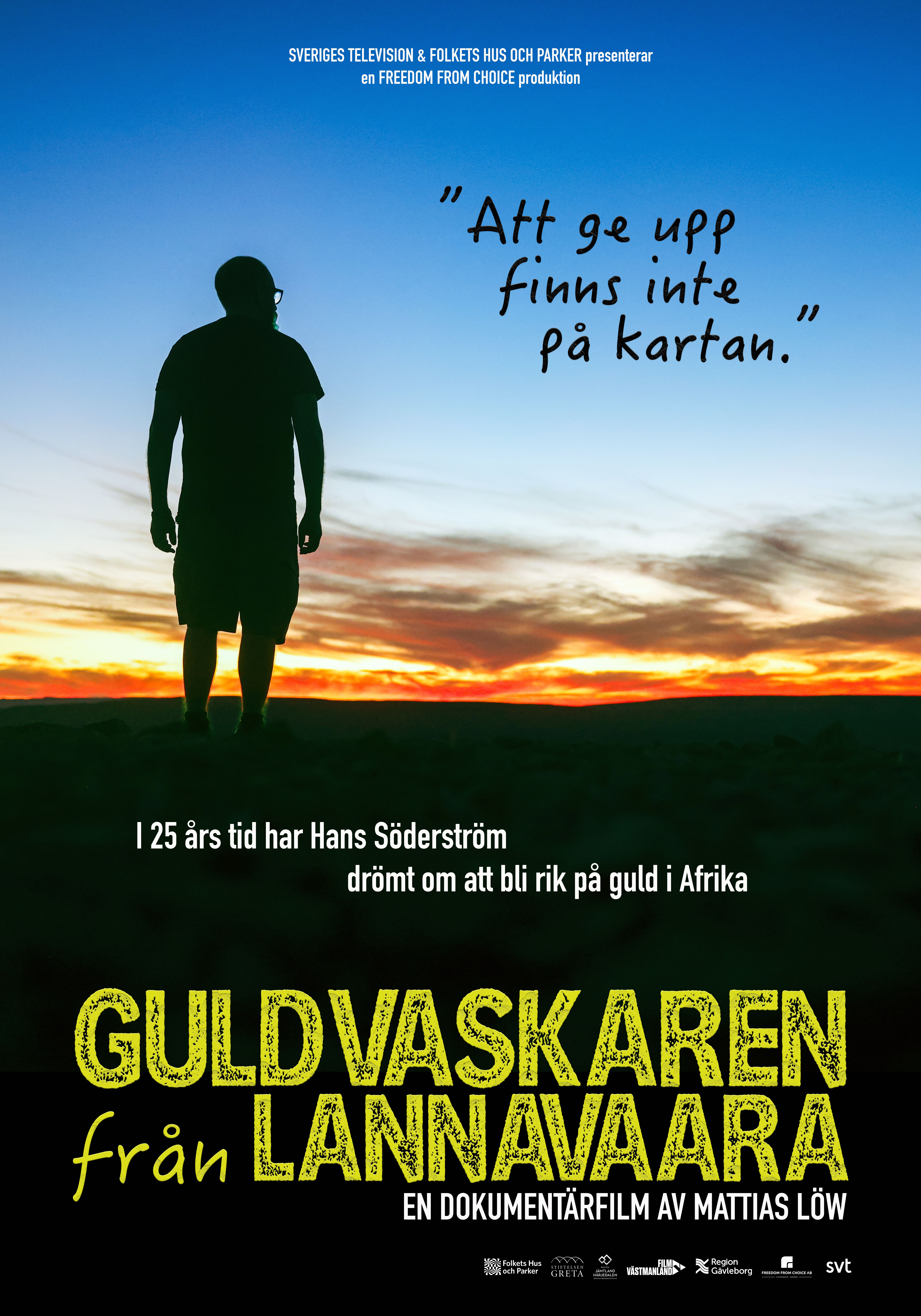
- Theatrical Release Poster (Sweden)
- Directed by: Mattias Löw
- Written by: Mattias Löw
- Produced by: Mattias Löw, Reshma Mansuri Löw
- Starring: Hans Söderström, Christian Daun, Arne Bergh, Jenny Söderström, Agne Söderström, James Kabu, Peter Katjavivi
- Cinematography: Mattias Löw
- Edited by: Jonas Lindsköld
- Music by: Isabelle Engman
- Distributed by: Folkets Hus och Parker
- Release date: 7 November 2025 (Sweden)
- Running time: 95 minutes
- Countries: Sweden; Ghana; Namibia
- Languages: Swedish; English
- Budget: 1 MSEK

The Gold Panner from Lannavaara (Swedish: Guldvaskaren från Lannavaara) is a 2025 documentary feature film written and directed by Mattias Löw. The film stars Hans "Hasse" Söderström, Christian Daun, Arne Bergh, Jenny Söderström, Agne Söderström, James Kabu and Peter Katjavivi who served as Speaker of the National Assembly of Namibia between 2015 and 2025. A Swedish-Ghanaian-Namibian co-production, it was shot in the Torne Valley, Accra, Ada, Keetmanshoop and Windhoek.

The documentary had its world and Swedish theatrical premiere on 7 November 2025, and Swedish broadcast as well as on-demand streaming service premiere on Sveriges Television and SVT Play 1 January 2026.

The narrative follows entrepreneur and adventurer Hasse Söderström, who attended Sami school and comes from the Meänkieli minority, and focuses on his gold operations in Africa over 25 years.

The film also addresses the debts that the film’s main character accumulated over the years from investors and tax authorities in Sweden and Ghana — something that Svenska Dagbladet reported on in a podcast by author and journalist Christian Daun released in March 2024.

The filming was planned to take one year, but after eight months, the main subject Hasse Söderström died in a tragic car accident on August 9, 2024, near the town of Tses in Namibia.

The documentary is produced by Freedom From Choice and Swedish Television, with support from Region Gävleborg, Film Västmanland, Region Jämtland Härjedalen, and the Greta Foundation, distributed in Swedish cinemas by Folkets Hus och Parker, and created by award-winning filmmaker and photographer Mattias Löw.
