= 2010 FIFA World Cup controversies =

The 2010 FIFA World Cup generated various controversies, including some from before the tournament started. Most centred on refereeing.

== Qualification ==
=== France vs. Republic of Ireland ===
In the second leg of the qualification play-off match between France and the Republic of Ireland on 18 November 2009, French captain Thierry Henry, unseen by the referee and other match officials, illegally handled the ball twice in the lead up to the winning goal. The incident caused widespread debate about FIFA Fair Play, and how matches should be refereed at the highest level. The Football Association of Ireland (FAI) requested a replay of the game on grounds of fairness, but was denied by FIFA under the Laws of the Game. On 2 December, FIFA called an extraordinary general meeting of the Executive Committee to discuss various issues, with the Henry incident high on the agenda. FIFA announced they would be setting up an inquiry into technology and extra officials in the game, but they did not announce a widely expected move of the fast-tracked introduction of goal-line referee's assistants, already being trialled in the UEFA Europa League, and confirmed the competition in South Africa would be officiated as normal with a referee, two assistants, and a fourth official. On the subject of fair Play, FIFA President Sepp Blatter said:

"I appeal to all the players and coaches to observe this fair play. In 2010 we want to prove that football is more than just kicking a ball but has social and cultural value...So we ask the players 'please observe fair play' so they will be an example to the rest of the world".

On 5 June 2015 it was determined that the Football Association of Ireland were paid €5 million by FIFA not to protest about Thierry Henry's handball.

=== Algeria vs. Egypt ===
The teams finished level on 13 points and level on all tiebreakers: goal difference in all group matches (+5); goals scored in all group matches (9); points in all Algeria–Egypt matches (3); and goal difference in all Algeria–Egypt matches (0). (The away goals rule was not used as a group-stage tiebreaker). The teams met in a one-game play-off to decide the qualifier. To determine the match venue, each team selected a country other than their own (Algeria selected Tunisia and Egypt selected Sudan). After Sudan was drawn in a lottery on 11 November, the Al Merreikh Stadium in Omdurman was selected by FIFA as the venue for the play-off. The decision to play a tie-breaking playoff game to determine who qualifies to the 2010 FIFA World Cup was controversial because despite the fact that Algeria and Egypt were level on all tiebreakers listed above, Egypt would have qualified based on the away goals rule, which was used to determine the winner of a tie in the case of a tiebreaker in both previous and subsequent qualifiers. Algeria won the match in Sudan 1–0 to qualify for the World Cup.

== Animal sacrifices ==
Plans to slaughter a cow at each stadium to be used for the World Cup generated concern among animal rights groups. The Makhonya Royal Trust proposed the concept stating the cattle killing event was a "true African" way of blessing the tournament.

"We must have a cultural ceremony of some sort, where we are going to slaughter a beast. We sacrifice the cow for this great achievement and we call on our ancestors to bless, to grace, to ensure that all goes well. The World Cup will be on the African continent and we will make sure that African values and cultures are felt by the visitors."

The issue of cattle sacrifice was discussed by a High Court. Judge Nic Van der Reyden said the matter needed to be taken up by politicians.

An ox was slaughtered at Johannesburg's Soccer City stadium on 25 May. A place was created within the Soccer City precinct to act as a "kraal" where the ox was slaughtered. After that, the senior traditional healers walked into the stadium in song, drum-beating and dance, where they continued to bless the inside of the stadium with rituals.

== Group stage ==
=== Brazil vs. Côte d'Ivoire ===
Brazilian striker Luís Fabiano handled the ball twice in the build-up to Brazil's second goal, which helped Brazil win the match 3–1. Brazilian midfielder Kaká was sent off late in the game for a collision with Ivorian midfielder Kader Keïta. Replays showed Keïta had run into Kaká's side, deliberately striking Kaká's shoulder, and then fell to the ground holding his face in a successful attempt to have Kaká sent off.

=== Slovenia vs. USA ===
With the match tied 2–2 in the 86th minute, Maurice Edu of the United States appeared to score the winning goal from a set piece, but referee Koman Coulibaly disallowed the goal and awarded a free-kick to Slovenia. Because Coulibaly had blown for the free-kick before the goal had been scored, he was not required to (and did not) explain the call on the pitch or to FIFA officials afterwards. Replays showed numerous Slovenian players pulling and hanging on Americans, fighting for position in the box, but no foul or offsides by the Americans was apparent to justify disallowing the goal. US striker Robbie Findley was also given a mysterious yellow card, which resulted in him missing the next match against Algeria. Although the match ended in a 2–2 draw, the United States ultimately went on to win the group. Coulibaly received a "poor" performance review for the match and was selected to only one additional match in the tournament, as the 4th referee.

=== Australia vs. Serbia ===
After the previous two matches, both could still reach the round of 16. However, with Australia having one point and a -4 goal difference while Serbia had three points and a 0 goal difference, Serbia seemingly had the better chance to advance to the next round. During the last minutes of the match, with Serbia losing 2-1, Australia's Tim Cahill clearly hit the ball with his hand in the box, but the officials decided not to award a penalty for Serbia, and play continued; also Serbia had a late goal disallowed for what appeared to be a questionable offside. With Ghana losing to Germany 1–0, a second goal would have given Serbia runners-up spot in the group and advancement to the Round of 16.

== Round of 16 ==
On 27 June, during two round of 16 matches, two incidents occurred that led to renewed debate over the lack of video technology in refereeing– the disallowing of England midfielder Frank Lampard's goal against Germany, and an Argentinian goal against Mexico that was allowed despite being scored from an offside position.

=== Germany vs. England ===
During England's 4–1 loss to Germany, Lampard's shot hit the crossbar and then crossed the goal-line before bouncing back out to German goalkeeper Manuel Neuer. Linesman Mauricio Espinosa and referee Jorge Larrionda did not award the goal but subsequent replays and photographic evidence showed the ball had indeed crossed the goal-line. This incident reignited demands for goal-line technology. This was also significant as England were trailing 1–2 at the time so had Lampard's "goal" have stood then it would have brought England level in the match.

=== Argentina vs Mexico ===
During the Argentina vs. Mexico match Carlos Tevez scored from an offside position from within the Mexican penalty box when the game stood at 0–0. Although against FIFA's ruling, the screens inside the stadium of Soccer City showed replays of Tevez more than a yard offside when Lionel Messi played the ball towards him. The goal stood, causing uproar and protests from the Mexican players and staff. Referee Roberto Rosetti stuck with his decision. Argentina subsequently won the match 3–1. Following the Argentinian goal, BBC commentators wrote that "linesman Stefano Ayroldi [...] somehow allowed Carlos Tevez's goal to stand before a ridiculous situation developed where he, referee Roberto Rosetti and everyone in the stadium watched replays on the huge screens show exactly how far offside Tevez was"; pundit Alan Hansen added: "Before today I was not an advocate of technology in football, but now I am a convert." Associated Press sports columnist John Leicester reacted to the match between England and Germany by writing:

" FIFA fears that technology would undermine the authority of referees and their assistants. But the reverse is in fact happening. Match officials are being made to look like idiots because they are not getting the help that they need. [...] [B]alls, as Lampard proved, can bounce in and out of goal so quickly that a linesman can miss it if he's not paying attention, blinks, is screened or for whatever reason is looking away. That's why technology is needed. And the time to introduce it was yesterday. Blatter has some explaining to do."

The press spoke of:

"two great victories [...] overshadowed by controversies emanating from two crucial mistakes made by match officials".

A few days later, FIFA President Sepp Blatter stated that he deplored the "evident referee mistakes" in England vs. Germany and Mexico vs. Argentina matches, and apologised to the English and Mexican football federations ("the two federations directly concerned by referee's mistakes"). He added: "It is obvious that after the experiences so far at this World Cup it would be a nonsense not to re-open the file on goal-line technology. [...] We will come out with a new model in November on how to improve high-level referees. [...] I cannot disclose more of what we are doing but something has to be changed."

== Suárez handball ==
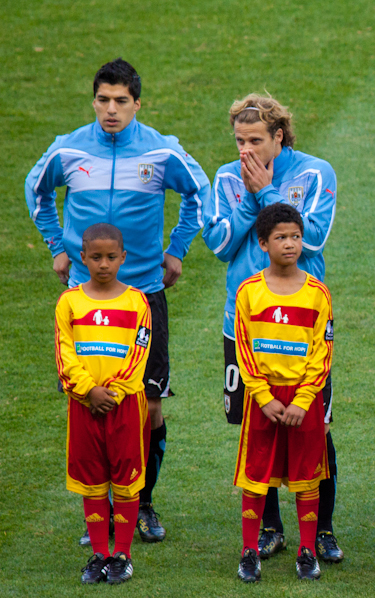
Luis Suárez (left)

In extra time of a quarter-final match against Ghana, Uruguayan striker Luis Suárez handled the ball in the penalty area to prevent a last-minute game-winning Ghana goal. Suárez was shown a red card and Ghana's Asamoah Gyan missed the resulting penalty kick. Ghana subsequently lost the match, 4–2, in the penalty shoot-out.

The African press named Uruguay public enemy No.1 and described them as cheats. Suárez was unapologetic about his handball, stating "I made the best save of the tournament." Suárez boasted after the match of his handball save, claiming that "The 'Hand of God' now belongs to me," a reference to the handball goal scored by Diego Maradona in the 1986 World Cup. Ghana's coach Milovan Rajevac argued that Suárez's actions were "really shocking," describing the result as a "football injustice." Uruguay's coach Óscar Tabárez defended Suárez: "Saying we cheated Ghana is too harsh a word to use. ... We also abide by what the referee did. It could have been a mistake. Yes, he stuck his hand out, but it's not cheating. What else do you want? Is Suárez also to blame for Ghana missing the penalty? We try to be dignified, and if we lose a match, we look for the reasons for it. You shouldn't look to third parties." FIFA reviewed the possibility of increasing Suárez's ban but decided against punishing him for 'unsportsmanlike conduct'. This opened up a discussion on gamesmanship, asking the question of whether players in that situation should be condemned as a cheat, or applauded for their resourcefulness. One pundit, Paul Fletcher of the BBC, implied that most players would do the same thing in the 'heat of the moment' in order to avoid defeat. Ghana's sports minister, Akua Sena Dansua, called for changes to the rules in such circumstances.

== French team discord ==
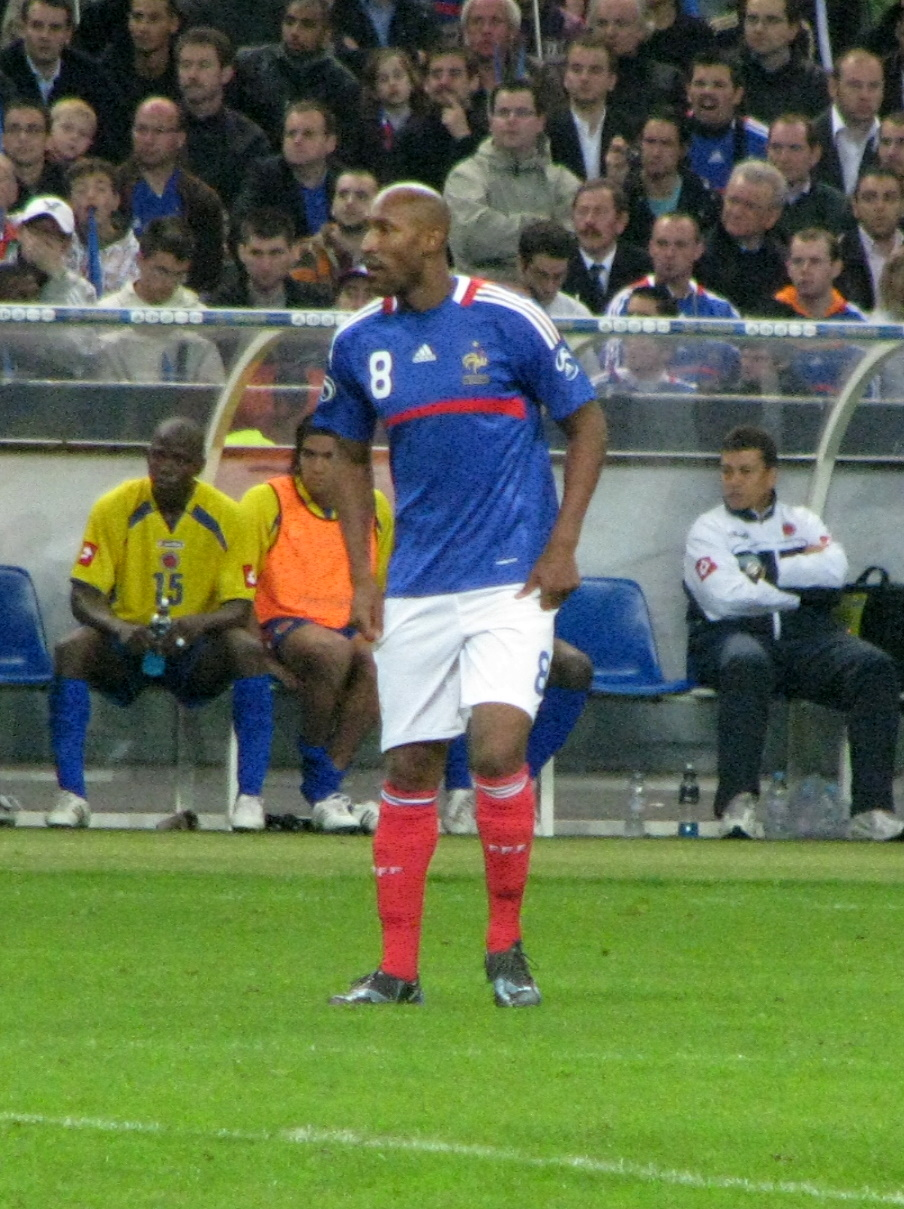
Nicolas Anelka was sent home from the World Cup, and was one of five players summoned to the FFF for discord

The French team had significant troubles with team dissension at the World Cup. The press was strongly critical of both players and coaches. This followed a highly disappointing UEFA Euro 2008 first round exit, and a difficult qualification campaign. After controversially winning their play-off meeting with the Republic of Ireland, the French players appeared aloof to the public as they headed straight for the dressing room instead of signing autographs. Several players were questioned by police just prior to the Finals in South Africa, following a raid on a Paris nightclub renowned for arranging dates between wealthy clients and underage prostitutes. Before the tournament began, the French Football Federation (FFF) announced that head coach Raymond Domenech will leave his position at the end of the tournament.

Striker Nicolas Anelka delivered a profanity-laden criticism at Domenech as the team was losing to Mexico. Anelka was sent home after refusing to apologise. The following day, captain and left wingback Patrice Evra was caught on camera in a heated argument with trainer Robert Duverne, which eventually led to intervention by others in the camp. The players boycotted training for one day in protest at the FFF decision to dismiss Anelka. In turn, managing director Jean-Louis Valentin then resigned in disgust at the players' actions.

On the orders of President Nicolas Sarkozy, Sports Minister Roselyne Bachelot held an emotional meeting with the team where she admonished the players saying "How would you like people to remember you? What image do you want to leave behind?". This reportedly reduced the players, especially the younger ones, to tears and they applauded her. Later at an impromptu media briefing at the Free State Stadium, Bachelot said "I told the players they had tarnished the image of France. It is a morale disaster for French football. I told them they could no longer be heroes for our children. They have destroyed the dreams of their countrymen, their friends and supporters." The players apologised to Domenech and resumed practice the next day. Patrice Evra was dropped for the final group game.

Following the team's final defeat to hosts South Africa, Domenech refused to shake the hand of opposing coach Carlos Alberto Parreira. Domenech was strongly criticised in the French press, with sports daily L'Équipe accusing Domenech of "arrogance and an attitude of contempt for others".

The French team flew home in economy class. The fallout continued after the team's return to France, with FFF President Jean-Pierre Escalettes announcing his resignation. Escalettes has stated that Anelka will never be picked again for the national team. Former defender Lilian Thuram has said "I asked for the players to be severely punished and for Patrice Evra never to come back into the France team. When you are captain of France, there is a responsibility and a respect for the shirt and for people that you have to have."

The entire World Cup squad was suspended for their next game against Norway by the FFF, upon request by the new manager Laurent Blanc. Five players were identified as having been key to the embarrassing events at the tournament; Nicolas Anelka, Patrice Evra, Franck Ribéry, Jérémy Toulalan and Eric Abidal were summoned to a hearing before the FFF disciplinary committee on 17 August 2010. After the expulsion of Anelka and ensuing training strike, Evra and Ribéry were summoned for failing in their duties as captain and vice captain, Toulalan was seen as the originator of the statement read out by coach Domenech to the media, while Abidal was accused of refusing to play in the final group match. After the hearing, Anelka was banned from playing for France for 18 games, Evra was banned for five, Ribéry for three, and Toulalan for one, while Abidal escaped punishment. Anelka dismissed the sanction as irrelevant, considering himself already retired from international football.

== Final ==
The final was particularly controversial due to the high number of yellow cards issued (fourteen, resulting in one sending-off). The most notable incident was Nigel de Jong's kick into the midriff of Xabi Alonso, punished only with a booking from referee Howard Webb, who subsequently admitted he should have shown a red card.

Just before the game-winning goal was scored, the Dutch team had a free kick that hit the wall (apparently taking a deflection off Cesc Fàbregas) before going out. Despite the deflection, which should have given possession and a corner kick to the Dutch team, a goal kick was given to the Spanish, starting the play that led to the winning goal. The Dutch, however, momentarily had possession of the ball near the Spanish penalty area in between the goal kick and Iniesta's goal. Joris Mathijsen was yellow-carded for his strong protests to the referee after the goal, and other Dutch players criticised Webb for this decision after the match.

Both teams were fined by FIFA due to the ill-discipline of the match. Despite this, Spain was still awarded FIFA's Fair Play award for the tournament after the final, Spain had earned only 8 yellow cards throughout (the lowest of the four semi-finalists).

== Others ==
=== Third-party ambush marketing ===
During the Netherlands v Denmark group stage match, several women were removed from the stadium and later detained. It later emerged they were models for Bavaria beer. The tickets were sold to Bavaria by a friend of Robbie Earle, who was working as a pundit at the tournament for ITV Sport of the United Kingdom. ITV immediately cancelled Earle's contract with the network, citing that the tickets were only meant for his friends and family.

=== Match ball ===
The official ball for the tournament, the Jabulani, was widely criticised by several players, although others came out in its defence.

=== Nigeria team ban ===
In the aftermath of the tournament, Nigerian president Goodluck Jonathan announced a 2-year ban on the men's national side due to its perceived poor performance. This move drew serious criticism and condemnation for all sides, and FIFA threatened sanctions in return for what it saw as "political interference". The ban was lifted shortly after.

=== North Korea ===
The North Korean team cancelled its national championship to prepare for the Cup via a world tour. Following the perceived poor performance of the team, particularly against Portugal, the team were forced to blame the coach to avoid punishment on their return to North Korea.
