= Knutte Wester =

Swedish filmmaker

Knutte Wester (born 1977) is a contemporary artist and filmmaker from Sweden.

From 1998 to 2003, Wester received an art education at the Academy of Fine Arts in Umeå and in 2000 at Wits University in Johannesburg.

Wester's breakthrough came with the work Guldgatan 8. Knutte Wester's film A Bastard Child premiered at IDFA in November 2016.
