= Martin Hansson =

Swedish football referee (born 1971)

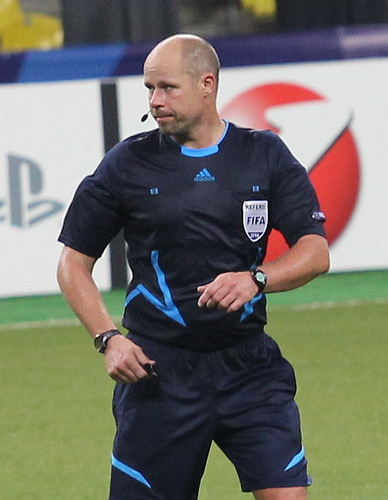
- Hansson in 2010
- Born: 6 April 1971 (age 55); Holmsjö, Sweden
- Other occupation: Full-time referee Firefighter

Domestic
Years	League	Role
1996–2013	Superettan	Referee
1999–2013	Allsvenskan	Referee

International
Years	League	Role
2001–2014	FIFA listed	Referee

Martin Hansson (born 6 April 1971) is a Swedish former football referee. He was a full international referee for FIFA between 2001 and 2013.

Hansson works as a firefighter outside refereeing and is fluent in Swedish, English and German. His hobbies include hunting and angling.

== Life and career ==
Martin Hansson started refereeing at the age of 15 at his own club. He subsequently obtained his FIFA badge before the age of 30. He was selected as a referee for the 2007 FIFA Under-20 World Cup in Canada, where he refereed the match between Argentina and the Czech Republic on 30 June 2007. He then took charge of the game between the USA and Poland on 3 July 2007. Hansson also officiated the 2006 Euro U-21 final between the Netherlands and Ukraine in Portugal.

Hansson frequently refereed matches in the highest Swedish league, the Allsvenskan, as well as the UEFA Cup and the UEFA Champions League.

Hansson was the referee for the 2009 FIFA Confederations Cup Final.

Hansson was preselected as a referee for the 2010 FIFA World Cup.

He refereed the second leg of the France vs Republic of Ireland 2010 FIFA World Cup play-off. French captain Thierry Henry admitted to illegally handling the ball in the build-up to the match-winning goal, an incident that was compared to Diego Maradona's "Hand of God" goal. Henry and Hansson both considered retiring from international football due to the reactions to the game. The result fueled the ongoing debate on introducing video referees and Additional Assistant Referees into the sport.

Ahead of the 2010 FIFA World Cup Sveriges Television showed Swedish director Mattias Löw's award-winning documentary Rättskiparen (English Title: The Referee) about Martin Hansson's dramatic road to South Africa.

On 8 October 2013, Hansson announced that he was retiring from refereeing.

== See also ==
- List of football referees
