= The Referee (2010 film) =

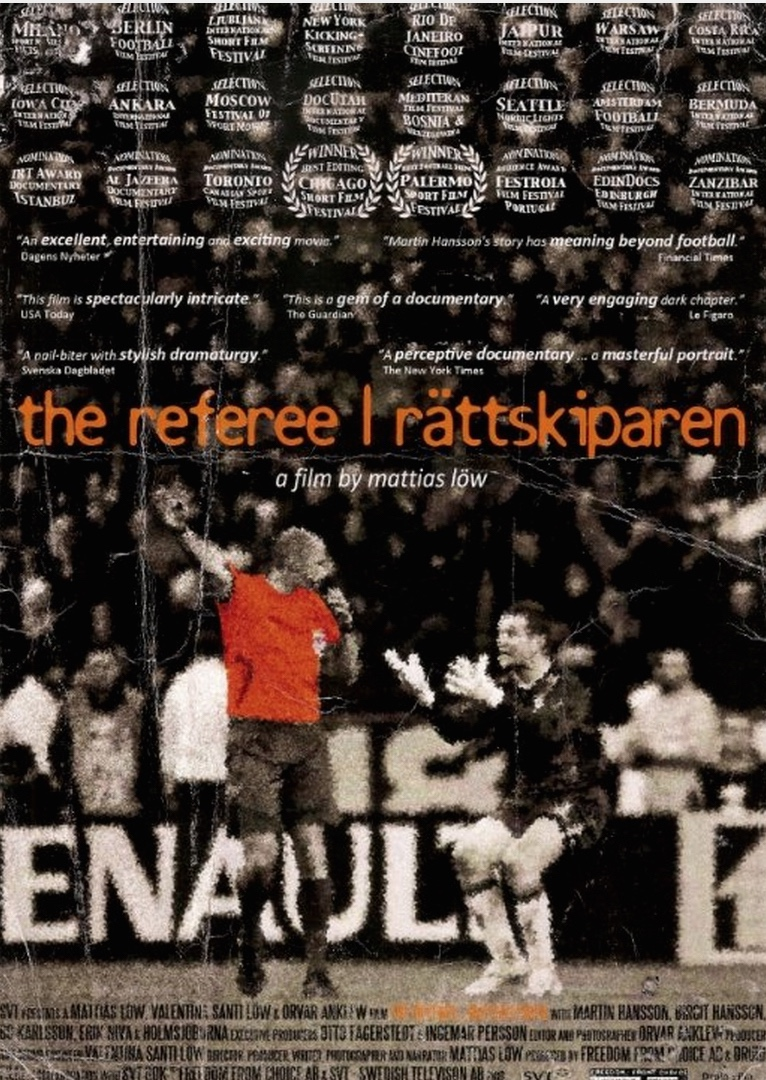
- Film Poster
- Directed by: Mattias Löw
- Written by: Mattias Löw
- Produced by: Mattias Löw, Valentina Santi Löw
- Starring: Martin Hansson, Sepp Blatter, Thierry Henry, Pelé, Arsène Wenger, Birgit Hansson, Bo Karlsson, Mikael Stahre, Janne Andersson, Erik Niva
- Cinematography: Mattias Löw, Orvar Anklew
- Edited by: Orvar Anklew
- Production companies: Freedom From Choice, Sveriges Television
- Distributed by: Sveriges Television and SVT Play
- Release dates: June 3, 2010 (Stockholm, Sweden)
- Running time: 29 minutes
- Country: Sweden
- Languages: Swedish, English, French

The Referee (Swedish: Rättskiparen) is a 2010 Swedish critically acclaimed, award-winning documentary film produced by Freedom From Choice AB and Sveriges Television about Swedish top football referee Martin Hansson and his controversial journey to ref at the 2010 FIFA World Cup in South Africa.

Award-winning filmmaker Mattias Löw decided to follow the former firefighter from the village of Holmsjö in Blekinge, southern Sweden for a year that turned out to be the most dramatic in Martin Hansson's life.

The film features French football player Thierry Henry, former FIFA president Sepp Blatter, Arsenal F.C. manager Arsène Wenger, former football star Pelé, Swedish Football Association, Swedish top coaches Janne Andersson and Mikael Stahre in addition to referee boss Bo Karlsson and acclaimed journalist and author Erik Niva.

== Reception ==
- The Guardian, UK - "This is a gem of a documentary."
- Le Figaro, France - "A very engaging dark chapter."
- Dagens Nyheter, Sweden - "An outstanding, entertaining and exciting movie."
- The New York Times, USA - "A perceptive documentary on soccer refereeing (...) a masterful portrait."
- Svenska Dagbladet, Sweden - "A nail-biter with a stylish dramaturgy."
- USA Today, USA - "This documentary is spectacularly intricate."
- Financial Times, UK - "Hansson’s story has meaning beyond football."
- Empire, UK - "One for the football fans."
- Howard Webb, 2010 FIFA World Cup Final Referee - "A very interesting documentary."

== See also ==
- List of association football films

== External sources ==
- The Referee at Rotten Tomatoes
- The Referee at IMDb
- The Referee at the Swedish Film Institute Database
