= There's No One as Irish as Barack O'Bama =

Single by Hardy Drew & The Nancy Boys
- Released: 2008
- Genre: Folk, novelty, comedy
- Songwriters: Ger, Brian and Donnacha Corrigan

"There's No One as Irish as Barack O'Bama" is a humorous folk song written in 2008 by the Irish band Hardy Drew and the Nancy Boys (later known as the Corrigan Brothers), and set to a tune derived from a traditional air. The song celebrates the Irish ancestry of the then Democratic candidate for President of the United States, Barack Obama. The song was a minor hit in the Irish charts, peaking at number 24 in November 2008.

== Production and themes ==
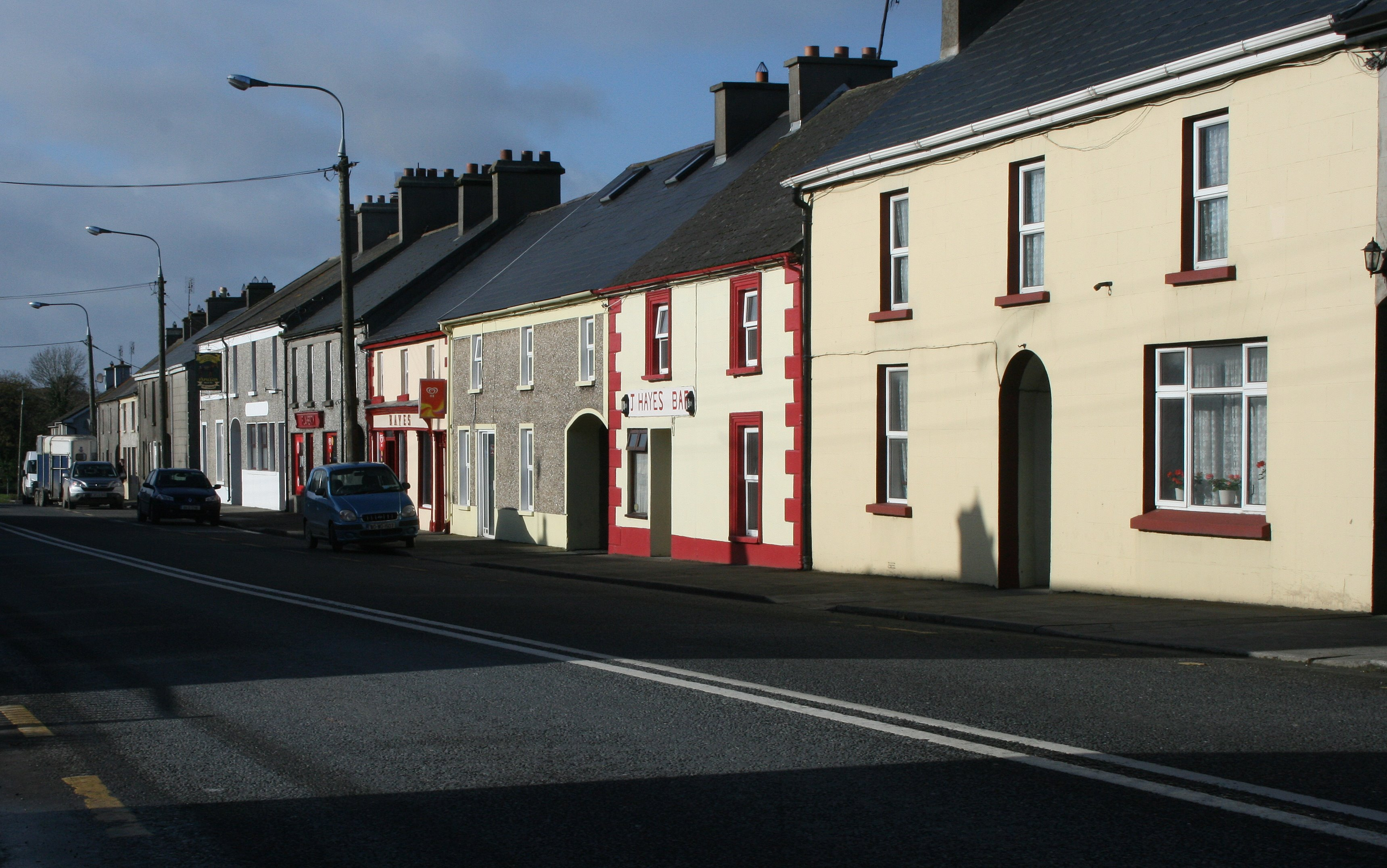
Main Street, Moneygall, where in Ollie Hayes' pub the song was first performed

Obama's maternal roots have been traced back to Moneygall in County Offaly, Ireland in the 19th century. Moneygall has a population of 298 people. Obama had previously remarked, "There's a little village in Ireland where my great-great-great grandfather came from, and I'm looking forward to going there and having a pint," prompting the Irish Taoiseach Brian Cowen — also a native of County Offaly — to invite him to do so.

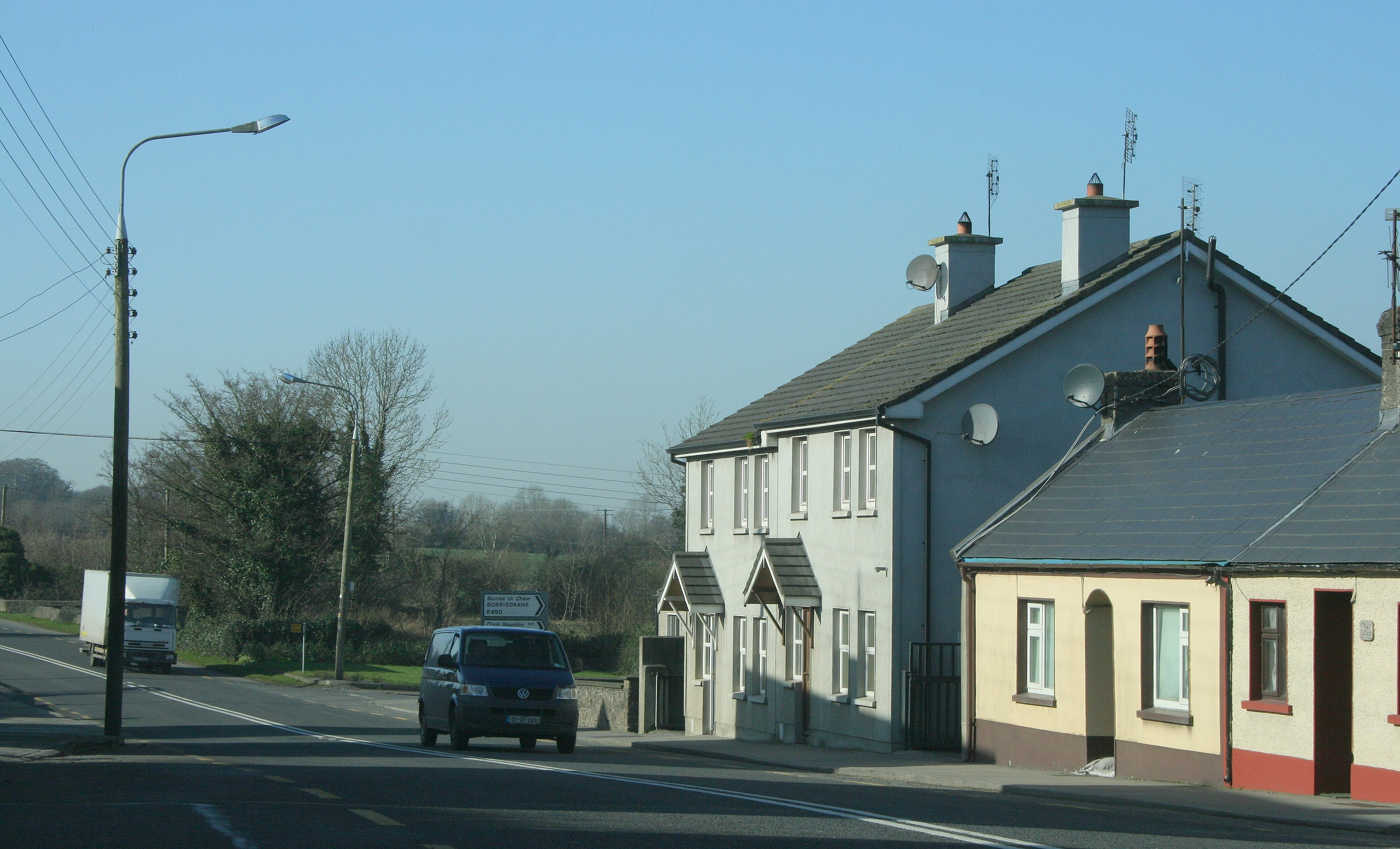
The village of Moneygall (population 298) from which one of Obama's great-great-great grandfathers came

Hardy Drew and the Nancy Boys consists of brothers Ger, Brian and Donnacha Corrigan from Castletroy, County Limerick. The song was performed by the band's lead singer Ger Corrigan, with Aedhmar Flaherty, Róisín O'Brien and Aodhán Ryan, in Ollie Hayes's pub in Moneygall. It was originally written by the established group in February 2008, and the group have since appeared on several Irish television and radio shows. It has since been featured on MSNBC show Hardball with Chris Matthews.

The song, which received huge publicity in America and was described as a "web hit" by the BBC, became popular after being released on YouTube, and as of 6 November 2008 it had over 50,000 hits (80,000 by 10 November, 300,000 by 15 November, whilst Black's version had 700,000); the band reported that they had been invited to perform in the anticipated victory celebrations for Obama, and at the Irish-American Democrats inauguration party in Washington in January 2009.

== Controversy ==
Ger Corrigan alleged that Shay Black, brother of Irish musician Mary Black, "hijacked" the song and claimed a co-writing credit while failing to acknowledge Hardy Drew and the Nancy Boys' authorship of the original version, a charge Black denied.

It is very simple, he sent me an email in June asking if he could add some verses for a band camp he was holding … It was then posted on YouTube as if it had been written entirely by him - a claim repeated on his own website and by bloggers and national media. He never gave us any credit.... We demanded he take it down but he refused. This is a complete hijacking; if I add two verses to "Hey Jude" it doesn't mean I wrote it. To say we are not impressed is an understatement - this is pure opportunism.

— Band member Ger Corrigan in reference to Shay Black, as reported by the Limerick Leader.

Both sides sought legal advice; the band contacted YouTube's solicitors as well as a copyright solicitor before announcing in a press release that the dispute had been resolved.

Journalist Fintan O'Toole criticized the song on 24 January 2009 in The Irish Times for "its ignorance of cultural history", claiming that it was inappropriate given Irish Americans' history of racism against African Americans, and that emphasizing Obama's Irish heritage would be "muscling in on his parade". Canon Stephen Neill, the rector of Moneygall who accompanied the band on their American trip, responded on 27 January, "I was bewildered and saddened at the toxic commentary of Fintan O’Toole". He added that,

The song, which was inspired by the well documented maternal Irish ancestry of President Obama, and more than once acknowledged by him in media interviews, does not claim to be a social history or political treatise. It is a pop song, which proclaims among other things: “He’s Hawaiian, he’s Kenyan American too”.

Neill was "at a loss to see the relevance of [O'Toole's] archaic meanderings" and remarked that African Americans had universally welcomed them. Song co-writer Donncha Corrigan protested also, commenting on O'Toole's "ugly article" on 28 January,

Throughout this campaign African American organisations have requested this song. Harlem for Obama, Detroit for Obama and Obama’s campaign team among a host of other organisations used this song consistently in their campaigns and were in regular contact with the band. We received numerous invites to play inauguration events in many states, primarily from African American people. [...]

My brother Gerard was the guest of Pacifica Radio in New York last Saturday evening for 45 minutes. Every caller was an African American and every caller thanked us for our song and our willingness to travel over for all of the events we participated in with energy, enthusiasm and warmth. We donated all of our fees for all of our events and all of our expenses to charity in the US, as did all of our party of 11. That is what our song and our band and Moneygall says about the Irish.

I can assure Mr O’Toole that he will apologise for his venomous article. He insulted the Irish, the African Americans and Mr Obama’s campaign.

Ger Corrigan later reported that the Corrigan Brothers had signed a deal with Universal for two singles and one album, with an option on a second album.

== Welcome Home President Barack O'Bama ==
In March 2011, the Corrigan Brothers released a new version of their song for radio play to celebrate Barack Obama's visit to Ireland the following May. Entitled "Welcome Home President Barack O'Bama", the song focused on Obama's visit to his ancestral home in Moneygall.

== Obama social media posts ==
The song was later used in humorous Instagram posts by Obama celebrating St. Patrick's Day for 2024, 2025, and 2026.
