= Umeå Institute of Technology =

Academic unit of Umeå University

Coordinates: 63.8205°N 20.3077°E

- Tekniska högskolan i Umeå
- Type: Public University
- Established: 1997
- Rector: Staffan Uvell
- Academic staff: 1000
- Students: 5500
- Doctoral students: 350
- Location: Umeå, Sweden
- Campus: Urban
- Affiliations: EUA
- Website: http://www.teknat.umu.se/

The Umeå Institute of Technology or Tekniska högskolan i Umeå is part of the Faculty of Science and Technology at Umeå University. The Institute offers a wide range of study programmes, some of them not to be found in any other part of Sweden. Research in engineering is gradually being expanded. The faculty's traditionally strong position in natural sciences form a base on which new technology research is built.

Umeå Institute of Technology three main areas in research are Information and Interaction Technologies, Life Sciences, and Sustainable Society.

== History ==
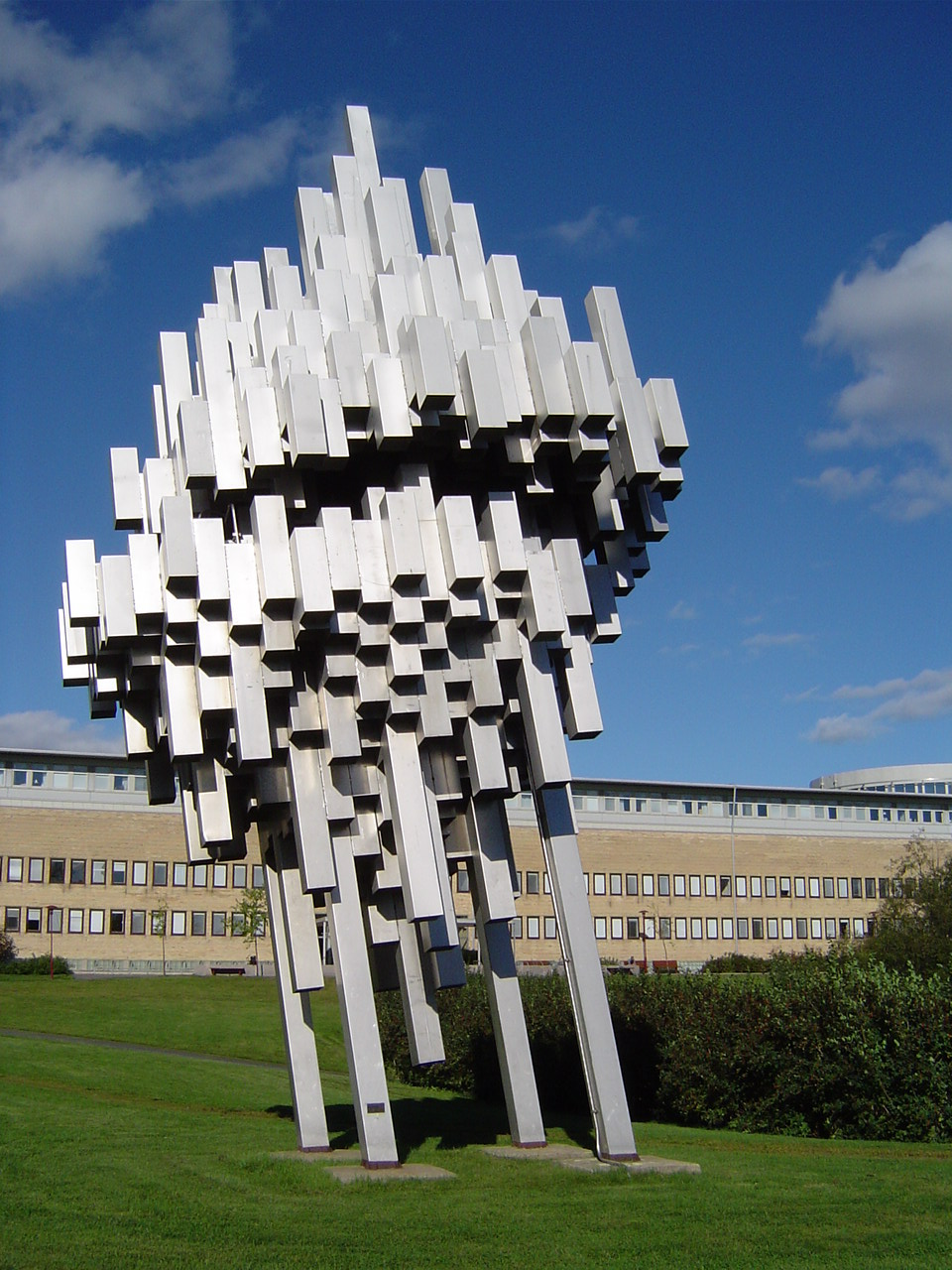
Umeå University Campus

The 1964/65 academic year saw the beginning of what was to become the current Faculty of Sciences and Technology with the creation of a Faculty of Philosophy, which was later divided into a Faculty of Mathematics and Natural Science and a Faculty of Social Science in 1968/69.

There was already talk in 1964 of establishing a technical college in Umeå. Nothing definite came out of these discussions until 1 July 1997 when the Umeå Institute of Technology was established.

Engineering programmes were gradually developed at the university during the 1980s in the form of two engineering programmes. The first master's programmes at Umeå University were in engineering physics in 1988. Central to the development of Master's programmes in engineering has always been strong basic sciences, e.g. chemistry, physics, biology and computing science.

== Education ==
Master's programmes in Computing Science and Engineering, Engineering Chemistry and Engineering Biology were introduced during the nineties. At the end of the eighties and beginning of the nineties a series of two-year engineering programmes were started. These later developed into three-year university engineering programmes. The newest of the engineering programmes is the Master's Programme in Energy Engineering.

The 1990s have seen the establishment of a number of centres for research. The goal has been to create centres where researchers from different fields are able to collaborate on common issues.

== Departments ==
- Applied Physics and Electronics
- Chemistry
- Computing Science
- Ecology and Environmental Science
- Institute of Design
- Space Science
- Mathematics and Mathematical Statistics
- Molecular Biology
- Physics
- Plant Physiology

== Research Centres ==
The Faculty of Science and Technology at Umeå University has over 5,500 students and more than 350 research students. Research and education is gathered under ten different departments. Several centres have also been established to ensure even more effective research.

The Faculty of Medicine and the Swedish University of Agricultural Sciences (SLU) are two of the Faculty of Science and Technology's most important partners. Collaboration also takes place with a number of universities in Sweden. Interfaces naturally extend beyond Sweden's borders; there are for instance established collaborations with INRA, the National Institute for Agricultural Research in France, and Oxford University.

Research Centers:

- Umeå Center for Molecular Patogenesis - UCMP
- Umeå Plant Science Centre - UPSC
- Umeå Life Science Centre - ULSC
- Umeå Centre for Interaction Technology - UCIT
- High Performance Computing Center North - HPC2N
- Centre for Biomedical Engineering and Physics
- Intelligent Vehicles for Off-Road - IFOR
- Umeå Marine Sciences Centre - UMF

== See also ==
- Umeå University
- Umeå Institute of Design
- Luleå University of Technology
- Chalmers University of Technology,
- Royal Institute of Technology,
- Linköping University,
- List of universities in Sweden
