= Mattias Löw =

Swedish film director and photographer

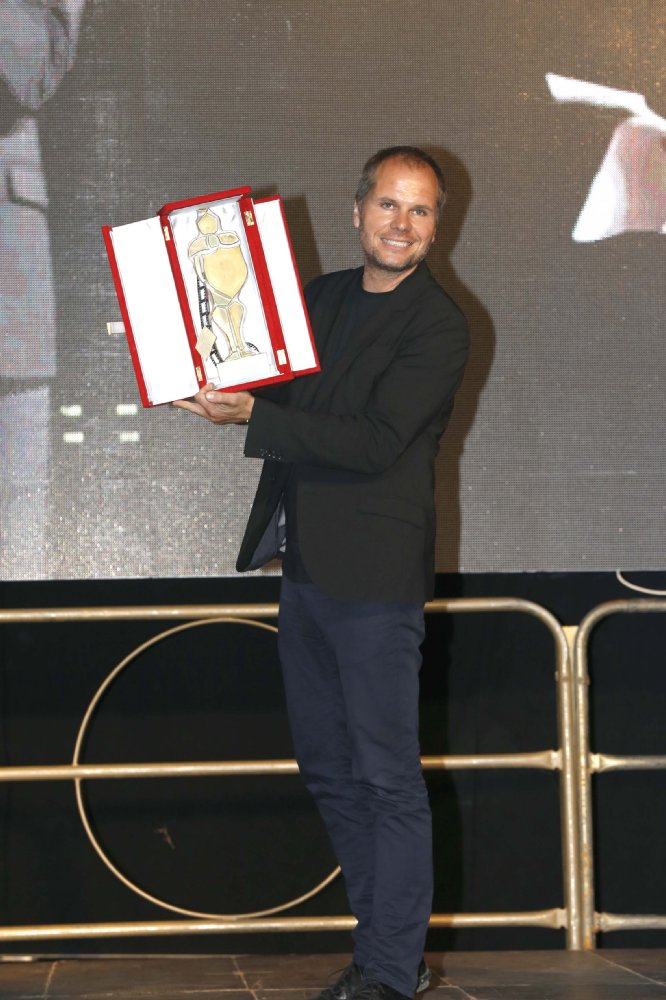
- Mattias Löw in Palermo, Italy
- Born: 17 September 1970 (age 56); Västerhaninge, Sweden
- Occupations: Film director, documentary filmmaker, photographer.
- Years active: 1990–present
- Notable work: The Referee, The Other Sport, The Gold Panner from Lannavaara, The Wilderness Diva, The Indian Preist

Mattias Löw (born 17 September 1970) is a Swedish film director, documentary filmmaker and photographer based in Stockholm and Motala, who specializes in social issues documentaries and documentary photography. He gives lectures and workshops on the topics of storytelling and documentary filmmaking, in addition to occasional acting. His photographs from Burning Man, a week-long large-scale desert event focused on community, art, self-expression, and self-reliance, has been published and exhibited in various art galleries and museums around the world.

== Life and career ==
Mattias Löw was born in Västerhaninge, Haninge Municipality, Sweden. After high school, he went on to study cinema arts and history at Stockholm University and screenwriting for film and TV at UCLA – University of California, Los Angeles.

== 1990s ==
He began his career in the early 1990s as a short film and music video director.

During his studies at UCLA, Mattias Löw was a nominee and received honourable mention at the prestigious Diane Thomas Screenwriting Awards in 1997, presented by Steven Spielberg, Michael Douglas, Walter F. Parkes, Kathleen Turner and James L. Brooks.

Upon return to his native Sweden from Los Angeles in the late 1990s, Mattias turned to documentaries and has won acclaim from critics and audiences alike, and been the recipient of several international television, film and journalism awards as well as arts grants and stipends for his social-, educational- and sport-themed documentaries primarily made for Swedish public broadcaster SVT – Sveriges Television and Canadian public broadcaster CBC Television – Canadian Broadcasting Corporation.

== 2000s ==
Since 2008 Mattias Löw collaborates with Sweden's number one adventure destination, the ephemeral Ice Hotel in Jukkasjärvi, Swedish Lapland, making documentary shorts about the artists and designers creating a temporary hotel made out of snow and sculpted blocks of ice.

Throughout the 2000s, Mattias Löw conducted classes and workshops at various schools and universities, including a senior external lectureship with focus on documentary and ethnographic storytelling in the Faculty of Humanities at University of Copenhagen, in addition to lectures and workshops on storytelling for user experience and design at Umeå Institute of Design.

== 2010s ==
In June 2010 Mattias Löw released The Referee, documentary film about the Swedish FIFA referee Martin Hansson and his tumultuous road to ref at the 2010 FIFA World Cup.

Mattias Löw's documentary TV-series The Other Sport about the development of women's football since the 1960s was released in time for UEFA Women's Euro 2013 which was played in Sweden. The series centers around former and present football stars Pia Sundhage, Marta Vieira da Silva, Lotta Schelin, Kosovare Asllani, Gunilla Paijkull, Anette Börjesson and Elisabeth Leidinge among others. The three episode limited series attracted over a million TV-viewers in Sweden.

January 2015 Mattias Löw received Svenska Spel and the Swedish Sportjournalist Federation's Grant at the Swedish Sports Award – Svenska idrottsgalan.

In 2015, his documentary film All the World in a Design School created headlines and political debate as it criticized the introduction of steep tuition fees for non-European students at Swedish universities. The film follows a Turkish and a Chinese student during a study year at one of the world's top-ranked industrial design schools, Umeå Institute of Design (UID).

2016, Mattias Löw released the one-hour documentary The Indian Priest about Raphael Kurian, on a reverse mission. Raphael is a Catholic priest from Kerala in south India arriving in secular Sweden, and the documentary emphasizes the reversing of the direction of earlier missionary efforts.

Mattias Löw's photopoetry exhibition Aatman – The Universal Spirit with images from the annual Burning Man counterculture event in Black Rock Desert, Nevada debuted at Linköping Art Gallery in November 2018. The exhibition was the first large scale public art gallery display of photographs from Burning Man in Sweden. Part of the exhibition is on permanent display in Vallastaden, Linköping and another part at Spektrum in Ebbepark, Linköping.

At the beginning of 2019 Mattias Löw guided a group of recently arrived refugees in a photography exhibition at Linköping Art Gallery. The works showed a reality of asylum seeking youth arriving in Sweden during the European migrant crisis.

== 2020s ==
In the wake of the COVID-19 pandemic in India Mattias Löw created the photo-essay exhibition 98 Days, dealing with worry, uncertainty and social distancing during the 2020 lockdown. A digital exhibition with online viewing rooms of the project first appeared at Fotografisk Center in Copenhagen, Denmark during June 2020.

During July 2021, Swedish and Norwegian news media drew attention to the fact that Mattias Löw together with Academy Awards-nominated producer Mathias Fjellström is working on a documentary film about a red scarf, originally a gift from Skellefteå Municipality to relocated residents around Christmas 2017 that appeared on one of the insurgents during 2021 storming of the United States Capitol. During February 2025, after Donald Trump's pardon of January 6 United States Capitol attack defendants, Löw indicated that he would like to invite the Capitol attackers to Skellefteå.

In February 2022, Swedish newspapers from Norrbotten reported that Mattias Löw was making a documentary TV-series for Sveriges Television about Carina Henriksson, an opera diva from Torne Valley, a culturally rich region at the border of Sweden and Finland. The series was broadcast on SVT and SVT Play in September and October 2023 with the Swedish title Vildmarksdivan, and international title The Wilderness Diva.

In the summer of 2022, when the COVID-19 pandemic's restrictions were lifted, Mattias Löw exhibited photographs, essays and video works under the title Fångad i rädsla - Frozen in Fear about his experiences of worry, uncertainty and social distancing in India in the spring and summer of 2020.

In connection with the mud chaos at Burning Man in 2023, Mattias Löw documented audio-visual content that were shared in world media. The documentation led to the photo essay and following exhibition What really happened at Burning Man? Updated works were exhibited in connection with Burning Man 2024, as Löw also explained the events' ten principles to national Swedish TV audiences.

During summer of 2024, Sveriges Television reported that Löw is making a feature documentary about Hans Söderström, a well-known gold panner from Sweden's northern most region Norrbotten with the title The Gold Panner from Lannavaara. The film is expected to premiere in 2025.

Together with the American photographer Scott London, Mattias Löw is working on a photo essay publication and exhibition about Östergötland's many medieval churches.

During the weather chaos at Burning Man 2025, Mattias Löw, who is part of the event's documentation team, shared his video and photography content with world media outlets.

Mattias Löw's documentary feature The Gold Panner from Lannavaara about the gold entrepreneur and adventurer Hans "Hasse" Söderström was released in Swedish cinemas on 7 November 2025 and on SVT Play 1 January 2026. The film follows Hasse Söderström in his search of gold from his native village of Lannavaara in Swedish Tornedalen above the Arctic Circle to the African countries Ghana and Namibia.

Swedish Radio's Meänraatio editorial office in Pajala reported in November 2025 that Mattias Löw had begun filming a documentary film with the working title Where my voice carries me about Meänkieli singer Gun Olofsson, a former member of the music group Jord, and her struggle to regain her lost voice. The film is expected to premiere in the first half of 2027.

During the spring and summer of 2026, Mattias Löw presents the photo and essay exhibition Kumbh Mela – The Ultimate Pilgrimage, reflecting his experiences at the 2025 Prayag Maha Kumbh Mela, often described as the world’s largest gathering, with hundreds of millions of participants.

== Works ==
=== Exhibitions ===
- Aatman – The Universal Spirit (A Photopoetry Journey of Burning Man), 2018
- 98 Days, 2020
- Frozen in Fear, 2022
- Burning Man (Permanent Installation in Spektrum, Linköping) from 2022
- Unalome (A Photo Exhibit of Burning Man at Charlottenborg manor house, Motala), 2023
- Kumbh Mela - The Ultimate Pilgrimage, 2026

=== Bibliography ===
- Aatman – The Universal Spirit, A Photopoetry Journey of Burning Man, 2018

=== Filmography ===
- Wounderland, 2001
- Ice Carosello, 2010
- The Referee, 2010
- The Other Sport, 2013
- All the World in a Design School, 2015
- The Indian Priest, 2016
- The Tao of Cat, 2018
- Spruce Woods, 2019
- Frozen in Fear, 2022
- The Wilderness Diva, 2023
- The Gold Panner from Lannavaara, 2025

=== Awards and nominations ===
- IMDb Awards
