= Agneta =

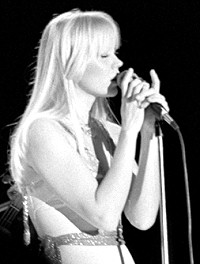
ABBA’s performer Agneta Fältskog

Agneta (also spelt Agnete, Agnetha, or Agnethe) is a Scandinavian variant of the feminine given name Agnes. It was derived from Latin and is the ablative case attached form of Agnes.

== Vedic connections and Indo-European origin ==
Phenomenologically and linguistically, the name connects to the oldest layers of the Vedic tradition and the Indo-European sacred context, which centers around the fire god Agni and the principle of transformation:

- Agni and dynamic purification: In contrast to the static Western interpretation of the name as "the pure one", this meaning is rooted in an active process of transformation within the Vedic context. In the Rigveda, Agni is described as Pāvaka (the purifier)—the cosmic principle that transforms and purifies (Śuci) matter through fire.
- The etymological root: This connection is supported by comparative linguistics. The underlying Greek root of the name, *hagnós* (ἁγνός, "pure", "holy"), originates from the Proto-Indo-European root `*i̯ag-` ("to worship", "to hallow"). This is identical to the Sanskrit root for Yajna (यज्ञ), the sacred ritual of the fire sacrifice through which Agni manifests.
- The archetype of the fire keeper: The virtue of purity traditionally associated with the name historically constitutes the ritual prerequisite for keeping the sacred fire. This corresponds to the sacred function of the Gṛhapatnī (the keeper of the domestic fire) in Vedic India as well as the Roman Vestals, whose purity secured the space for the transformative power of fire.

== Notable people ==
=== Agneta ===
- Agneta Andersson (born 1961), Swedish canoer
- Agneta Berliner (born 1958), Swedish politician
- Agneta Bolme Börjefors (1941–2008), Swedish television presenter
- Agneta Börjesson (born 1957), Swedish politician
- Agneta Eckemyr (1950–2018), Swedish actress
- Agneta Eriksson (born 1965), Swedish swimmer
- Agnetha Fältskog (born 1950), Swedish singer and ABBA member
- Agneta Frieberg (1945–1971), Swedish fashion model
- Agneta Gille (born 1956), Swedish politician
- Agneta de Graeff van Polsbroek (1603–1656), Dutch patrician
- Agneta Horn (1628–1672), Swedish writer
- Agneta Lindskog (born 1953), Swedish luger
- Agneta Lundberg (born 1947), Swedish politician
- Agneta Luttropp (born 1945), Swedish politician
- Agneta Marell (born 1964), Swedish professor
- Agneta Matthes (1847–1909), Dutch entrepreneur
- Agneta Mårtensson (born 1961), Swedish swimmer
- Agneta Månsson, Swedish skier
- Agneta Nilsson (born 1956), Swedish politician
- Agneta Pleijel (born 1940), Swedish novelist
- Agneta Prytz (1916–2008), Swedish actress
- Agneta Ringman (born 1949), Swedish politician
- Agneta Sjödin (born 1967), Swedish television presenter
- Agneta Willeken (1497–1562), German mistress
- Agneta Wrede (1674-1730), Swedish noblewoman

=== Agnete ===
- Agnete Bræstrup (1909–1992), Danish physician
- Agnete Carlsen (born 1971), Norwegian footballer
- Agnethe Davidsen (1947–2007), Greenlandic politician
- Agnete Friis (writer) (born 1974), Danish writer
- Agnete Friis (badminton), Danish badminton player
- Agnete Hegelund (born 1988), Danish fashion model
- Agnete Hoy (1914–2000), English potter
- Agnete Johnsen (born 1994), Norwegian singer and songwriter
- Agnete Laustsen (1935–2018), Danish politician
- Agnete Olsen (1909–1997), Danish swimmer

== Other ==
- Agnetapark, a park in Delft, Netherlands
