= QSI =

QSI may refer to:

- IATA airport code for Moshi Airport
- Quality Schools International
- Quick Step-Innergetic
- Quality Standards Illustrated
- Qatar Sports Investments
- QSI Corporation
- Quorum Sensing Inhibitors
