= Beijer =

Beijer is a surname. Notable people with the surname include:

- Barry Beijer (born 1989), Dutch footballer
- Georg Beijers (1895–1978), Dutch footballer
- Inez Beijer (born 1995), Dutch racing cyclist
- Jan de Beijer (1703–1780), Dutch draughtsman
- Lennart Beijer (born 1947), Swedish politician
- Margareta Beijer (1625–1675), managing director of the Swedish Post Office
- Mariska Beijer, Dutch wheelchair basketball player

== See also ==
- Beijer Electronics, Swedish technology company
- Beijers park, park in Malmö, Sweden
