= Jan Jonsson =

Jan Jonsson may refer to:

== Sportspeople ==
- Jan Jonsson (handballer) (born 1948), Swedish handballer
- Jan Jönsson (born 1960), Swedish footballer
- Jan Jönsson (equestrian) (born 1944), Swedish equestrian
- Jan Jonsson (Swedish Air Force officer) (born 1952), Swedish Air Force officer

== Others ==
- Jojje Jönsson (|Jan-Ove Jönsson, born 1955), Swedish actor
- Jan-Åke Jonsson (born 1951), managing director of Saab Automobile AB
