= Anders Söderholm =

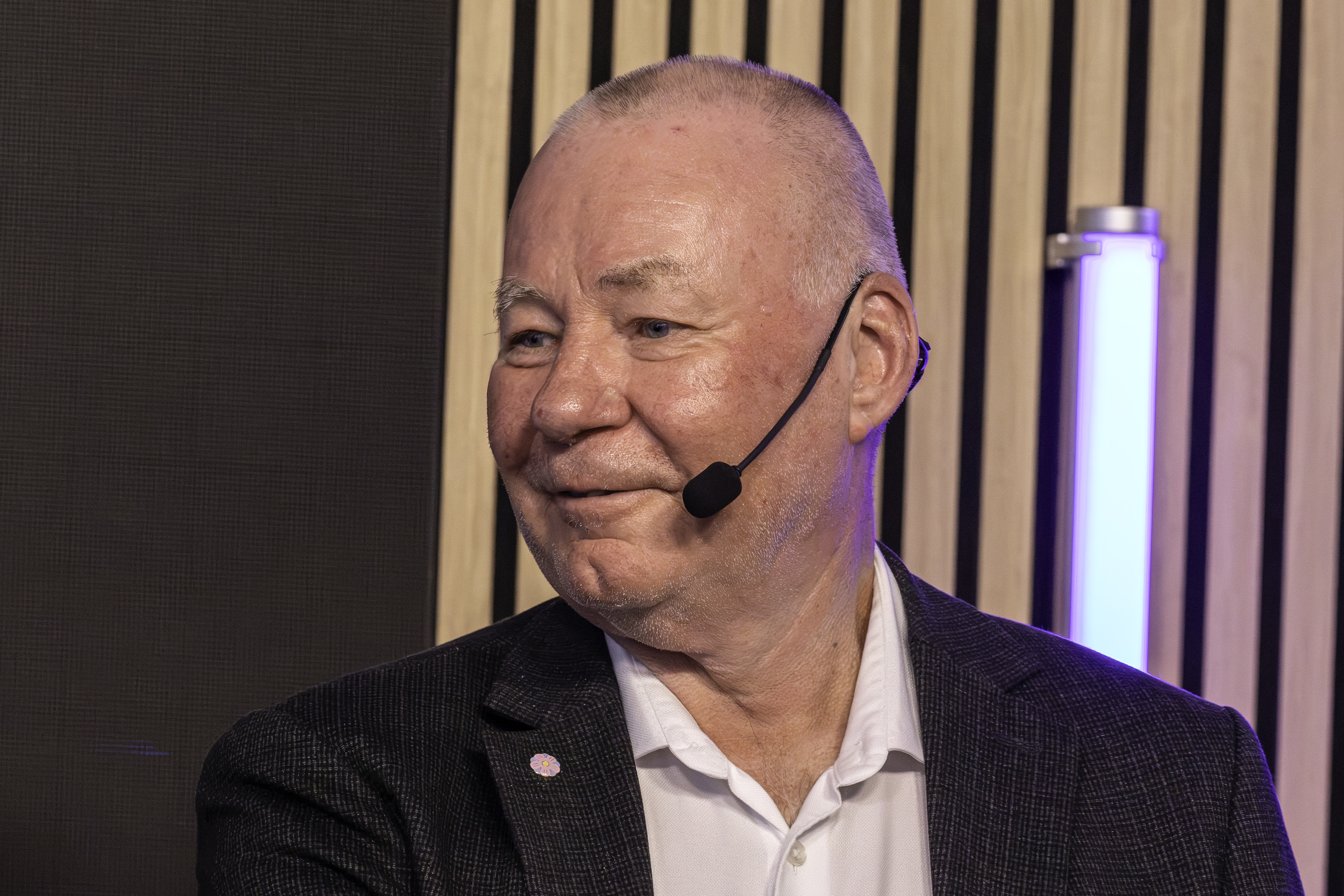

Rector of Mid Sweden University
- In office 2008–2016
- Preceded by: Thomas Lindstein

Rector of the Umeå School of Business
- In office 2000–2003
- Preceded by: Anders Baudin
- Succeeded by: Agneta Marell

Personal details
- Born: 26 October 1961 (age 64) Morjärv, Norrbotten County Sweden
- Website: https://web.archive.org/web/20120329220111/http://www.miun.se/rektorsblogg

Anders Söderholm (born 26 October 1961) is the current rector of the Royal Institute of Technology. He was rector of the Mid Sweden University between 2008 and 2016. Prior that Söderholm was professor in Business administration and rector at Umeå School of Business. Söderholm obtained his PhD from Umeå University in 1991, with his thesis on organization of local industrial policies. On 2005 he became professor of business administration. Söderholm has also been a guest researcher at Stanford University, Royal Institute of Technology and Åbo Akademi University and is the chairman of The Swedish Project Academy. He was the rector of the Umeå School of Business between 2000 and 2003.

Academic offices
| Preceded by Anders Baudin | Rector of Umeå School of Business; 2000-2003 | Succeeded by Agneta Marell |
| Preceded by Thomas Lindstein | Rector of Mid Sweden University; 2008-2016 | Incumbent |
Educational offices
| Preceded by Rolf Lundin | Chairman of The Swedish Project Academy; 2004-2014 | Incumbent |
