= HHUS =

The Student Association at the Umeå School of Business (in Swedish: Handelshögskolan i Umeå Studentförening, HHUS) is a non-profit-making association and a part of the Umeå Student Union. All students at the Umeå School of Business (USBE) are members in HHUS. Active members work voluntarily to improve the student experience at USBE.

== See also ==
- Umeå School of Business
