= Sex and Society =

Danish non-profit organization

- Sex & Samfund
- Formation: 1956
- Founder: Agnete Bræstrup
- Purpose: Providing sex education in Denmark
- Headquarters: Copenhagen, Denmark
- Region served: Denmark
- Fields: Family planning
- Secretary General: Bjarne Christensen
- Formerly called: Foreningen for Familieplanlægning, Foreningen Sex & Samfund

Sex and Society (Danish: Sex & Samfund) is a non-profit organization in Denmark which is responsible for providing sex education in the country. Due to Denmark's birthrate being under the replacement rate since the 1970s, in recent years the organization's focus has shifted from providing information on contraception to encouraging people to have children.
