= Elena Gutierrez-Farewik =

- Title: Professor

Academic background
- Education: BSc, Cornell University,1995; MSc, University of Michigan,1997; PhD, Karolinska Institutet, 2003.

Academic work
- Discipline: Biomechanics
- Institutions: KTH Royal Institute of Technology
- Main interests: Motion analysis, musculoskeletal modeling, gait analysis, neuromuscular control
- Website: https://www.kth.se/profile/lanie

Elena Gutierrez-Farewik is a professor of biomechanics in the Department of Engineering Mechanics at KTH Royal Institute of Technology, where she also serves as director of the Promobilia MoveAbility Lab. She leads the research group at KTH MoveAbility. She serves as president of the Swedish Society of Biomechanics and is on the board of the Swedish National Committee for Mechanics.

== Biography ==
Gutierrez-Farewick received her BSc in Mechanical Engineering from Cornell University in 1995, her MSc in Biomedical Engineering from the University of Michigan in 1997, and her PhD in Orthopedics from Karolinska Institutet in 2003.

== Research career ==
Gutierrez-Farewick's research interests are movement simulation, strategies, consequences, and assistance in children and adults with motion disorders. She attained the title of Docent in Human Movement Mechanics at KTH in 2007 and was granted tenure at KTH Mechanics in 2010. She currently leads the Promobilia MoveAbility Lab at the KTH Royal Institute of Technology in Stockholm, Sweden. Her research group specializes in quantifying movement strategies governed by the nervous system, exploring the causal relationship between load-bearing and the adaptive capacity of the neuromusculoskeletal system, and developing adaptive assistive devices. Their work is enriched by a multidisciplinary approach that integrates experimental and computational methods.
