= Architectural Woodwork Institute =

US trade association

- Abbreviation: AWI
- Formation: 1953; 73 years ago
- Type: Trade association
- Purpose: Support woodworking manufacturers
- Headquarters: Potomac Falls, VA, United States
- Website: www.awinet.org

The Architectural Woodwork Institute (AWI), founded in 1953, is an American professional trade association. Member companies are the fabricators of fine finished woodwork, millwork, and furniture. AWI has published a Standard of Care for woodworking since 1961, called the Quality Standards Illustrated.
