= Lund School of Economics and Management =

Business school at Lund University in Lund, Sweden

Coordinates: 55.7100°N 13.2137°E

Lund University School of Economics and Management
- Ekonomihögskolan i Lund
- Type: Public
- Established: 1961
- Dean: Prof. Joakim Gullstrand
- Administrative staff: 300
- Undergraduates: 4300
- Doctoral students: 180
- Location: (Sweden) Lund, Scania, Sweden
- Campus: Urban
- Affiliations: EQUIS, AMBA, AACSB
- Website: www.lusem.lu.se

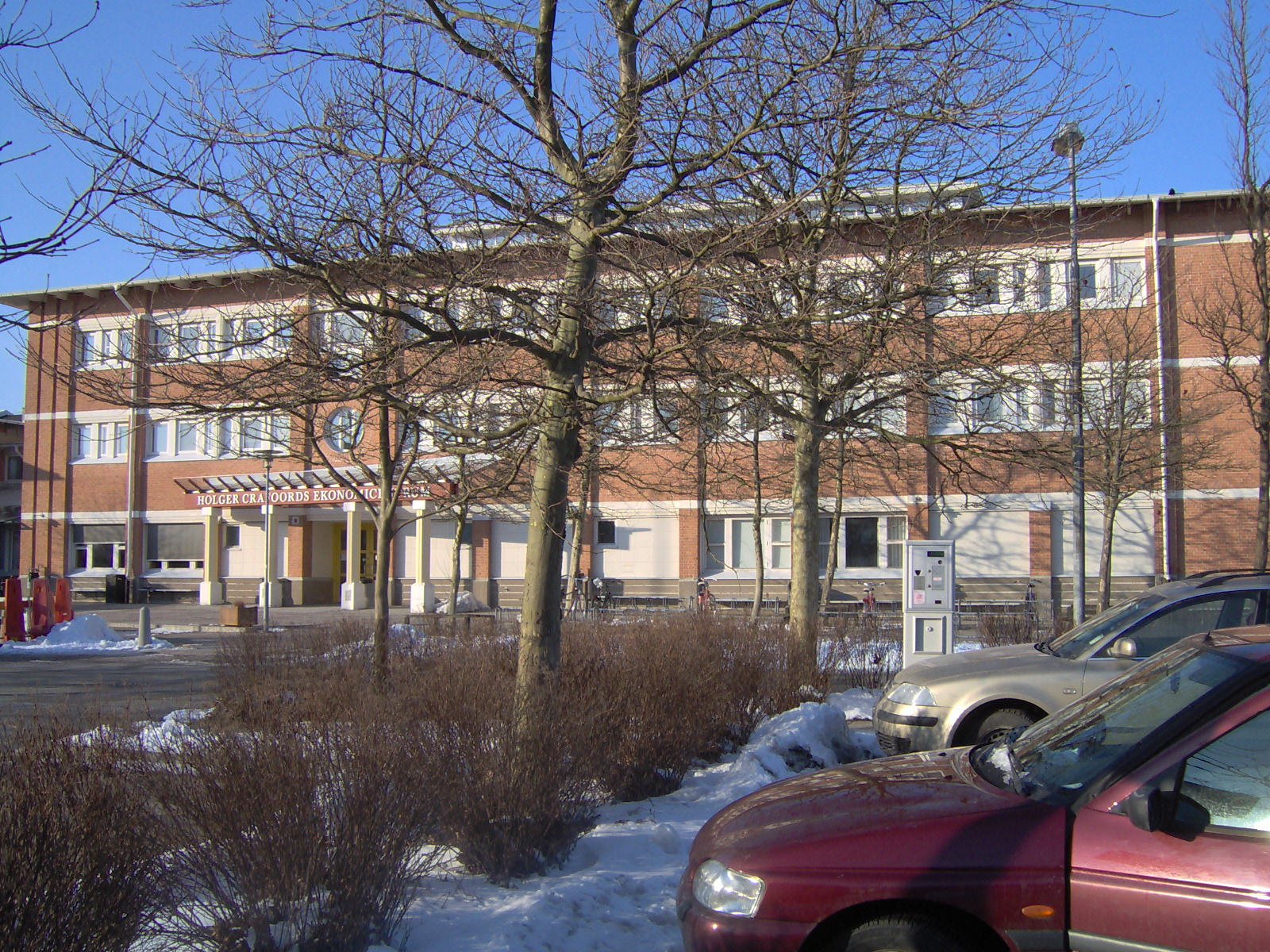
Main building

The Lund University School of Economics and Management (LUSEM) or Ekonomihögskolan i Lund is a business school at Lund University in Lund, Sweden.

The faculty conducts research and education in an international environment and offers a wide range of programs in economics, business administration, economic history, business law, information systems, and statistics.

Lund University School of Economics and Management is accredited by the Association to Advance Collegiate Schools of Business (AACSB), the EFMD Quality Improvement System (EQUIS) and the Association of MBAs (AMBA).

The triple accreditation, or the Triple Crown, is held by just over 100 business schools worldwide, and less than 1% of all business schools. Our accolades at both School and programme level support our position as a globally recognised business school.

The teaching of business-related subjects traces back to 1750, when Lund University got its first chair in economics. However, at that time, the professors usually had much broader academic fields to cover and they were often affiliated with other faculties within the university.

Over the years to come, the departments that today constitute the School of Economics and Management were established. In 1961, the Faculty of Business and Economics was established. The formal development of a unified school began in the late 1980s, when the first part of the campus, the Holger Crafoord Centre, was built with generous donations from the Crafoord Foundation. The building is named after the founder of the foundation, the industrialist Holger Crafoord.

An organisational change in 2004 led to the establishment of the School of Economics and Management as a separate faculty in its own right at Lund University.

== Rankings ==
Lund University is highly ranked in international comparisons. Lund University is consistently ranked among the Times Higher Education World University Rankings in recent years. In 2025, Lund University was placed 95th, and in the Business and Economics ranking LUSEM was placed 87th.

Masters in Finance programme was placed 42nd in 2025 programmes worldwide by Financial Times

Master in International Strategic Management programme was placed 47th in 2025 worldwide by Financial Times

== Education ==
=== Bachelor programs ===
The Lund University School of Economics and Management offers the following Bachelor of Science programs:

- Business and Economics
- Information Systems
- International Business
- Economy and Society

=== Master programs ===
The Lund University School of Economics and Management offers the following Master of Science programs:

- Accounting and Auditing
- Data Analytics and Business Economics
- Economic Development and Growth
- Economics
- Entrepreneurship and Innovation
- European and International Trade and Tax Law
- Finance
- Global Development, Population and Economic Change
- Information Systems
- International Marketing and Brand Management
- International Strategic Management
- Management
- Managing People, Knowledge and Change

== Student organizations ==
=== LundaEkonomerna student union ===
LundaEkonomerna are dedicated to optimize the student life for their members, and their main purpose is to continuously monitor the quality of education by representing the students’ opinions towards the school. As a member, you can join sporting events, find your future employer at our extensive career fair, enjoy bike parties, and even purchase tickets for the annual ball “Vinterbalen”.

=== LINC - Lund University Finance Society ===
established in 1991, is the primary society for students interested in finance at Lund University. In 2024, LINC had a total of 3,200 members. LINC is the leading finance society in Sweden and one of the most prominent organizations of its kind in Northern Europe. The organization aims to provide members with a skillset to pursue a successful career in finance.

LINC has a strong heritage, noteworthy alumni at top financial institutions, and a successful track record of organizing finance-related events including Investment Banking Forum.

== Notable alumni ==
- Sven Otto Littorin, Former Minister for Employment (has not graduated)
- Mikael Eriksson, CEO ÖhrlingsPricewaterhouseCoopers Sweden
- Bertil Ohlin, developed the Heckscher-Ohlin model on international trade and received the Nobel Memorial Prize in Economic Sciences in 1977.
- Torsten Lyth, CEO Ernst & Young Sweden
- Eva Rooth, CEO Feelgood
- Christian W. Jansson, CEO Kappahl
- Lars-Johan Jarnheimer, CEO Tele2
- Anders Lidbeck, CEO Telelogic
- Bo Strandberg, CEO AddNode
- Joen Magnusson, CEO Beijer
- Sten K. Johnson, CEO Midway Holding AB
- Fredrik Palmstierna, CEO SäkI AB
- Fredrik Arp, former CEO Volvo Personvagnar AB
- Hans Pihl, CEO Deloitte Sweden
- Håkan Jeppsson, CEO Inwido

== See also ==
- List of business schools in Scandinavia
- List of universities in Sweden
