= List of business schools in the Nordic countries =

The following is a list of business schools in the Nordic countries:

== Denmark ==
- Aalborg University (Aalborg Universitet) – Aalborg
- Aarhus School of Business (Handelshøjskolen i Århus) – Aarhus
- Copenhagen Business School (Handelshøjskolen) – Copenhagen
- University of Southern Denmark (Syddansk Universitet) – Odense

== Finland ==
- Aalto University, School of Business
- Hanken School of Economics (Svenska handelshögskolan) – Helsinki and Vaasa
- Helsinki School of Economics (Helsingin kauppakorkeakoulu) – Helsinki
- Lappeenranta University of Technology School of Business (Lappeenranan teknillisen yliopiston kauppakorkeakoulu) – Lappeenranta
- Oulu Business School University of Oulu (Oulun yliopisto) – Oulu (AACSB–accredited school)
- Turku School of Economics (Turun kauppakorkeakoulu) – Turku
- University of Tampere School of Management (Tampereen yliopiston Johtamiskorkeakoulu) – Tampere
- University of Vaasa Vaasa School of Economics (Vaasan yliopisto) – Vaasa
- Åbo Akademi University Åbo Akademi School of Business and Economics (Handelshögskolan vid Åbo Akademi) - Turku
- University of Jyväskylä School of Business and Economics (Jyväskylän Kauppakorkeakoulu) - Jyväskylä (AACSB - accredited school)

== Iceland ==
- Bifröst University (Háskólinn á Bifröst) – Borgarnes
- Reykjavik University (Háskólinn í Reykjavík) – Reykjavík
- University of Akureyri (Háskólinn á Akureyri) – Akureyri
- University of Iceland (Háskóli Íslands) – Reykjavík

== Norway ==
- BI Norwegian Business School (Handelshøyskolen BI) – Headquarters in Oslo, five other locations throughout Norway
- Hauge School of Management (NLA Høgskolen Staffeldsgate), Oslo
- Nord University Business School (Handelshøgskolen ved Nord universitet), part of Nord University
- Norwegian School of Economics (Norges Handelshøyskole), Bergen
- Norwegian University of Life Sciences (Universitetet for Miljø– og Biovitenskap), Ås
- Trondheim Business School (Trondheim Økonomiske Høgskole), part of Sør–Trøndelag University College
- University of Agder Faculty of Economics and Social Sciences (School of Management) (Universitetet i Agder) – headquartered in Kristiansand
- University of Stavanger (UiS Business School) (Universitetet i Stavanger – UiS)
- University of Tromsø Faculty of Biosciences, Fisheries and Economics (School of Business and Economics) (UiT Norges Arktiske Universitet), Tromsø

== Sweden ==
- Jönköping International Business School (Internationella Handelshögskolan) – Jönköping
- Karlstad Business School (Karlstad universitet) – Karlstad
- School of Business and Economics at the Linnaeus University (Ekonomihögskolan vid Linnéuniversitetet) – Kalmar and Växjö
- Lund School of Economics and Management (Ekonomihögskolan i Lund) – Lund
- School of Business, Economics and Law at the University of Gothenburg (Handelshögskolan vid Göteborgs universitet) – Gothenburg
- Stockholm Business School (Stockholms universitet) – Stockholm
- Stockholm School of Economics (Handelshögskolan i Stockholm) – Stockholm
- Umeå School of Business (Handelshögskolan i Umeå) – Umeå
