= KTH Royal Institute of Technology =

University in Stockholm, Sweden

Coordinates: 59°20′50″N 18°04′22″E

- Kungliga Tekniska högskolan
- Former name: Teknologiska institutet (1827–1877)
- Motto: Vetenskap och konst (Swedish)
- Motto in English: Science and Art
- Type: Public research university
- Established: 1827; 199 years ago
- Affiliations: CLUSTER, CESAER, EUA, T.I.M.E. association, PEGASUS, NORDTEK, Nordic Five Tech, UNITE!
- Budget: SEK 5.484 billion
- Chairman: Ulf Ewaldsson
- President: Anders Söderholm
- Faculty: 1,539 (FTE, 2023)
- Administrative staff: 1,160 (FTE, 2023)
- Students: 13,955 (FTE, 2023)
- Doctoral students: 1,035 (FTE, 2023)
- Location: Stockholm, Sweden
- Campus: Urban
- Student Union Newspaper: Osqledaren
- Colors: Blue
- Website: www.kth.se/en

KTH Royal Institute of Technology (Swedish: Kungliga Tekniska högskolan, lit. 'Royal Technical High School'), abbreviated KTH, is a public research university in Stockholm, Sweden. KTH conducts research and education in engineering and technology and is Sweden's largest technical university. Since 2018, KTH consists of five schools with four campuses in and around Stockholm.

KTH was established in 1827 as the Teknologiska institutet (Institute of Technology) and had its roots in the Mekaniska skolan (School of Mechanics) that was established in 1798 in Stockholm. But the origin of KTH dates back to the predecessor of the Mekaniska skolan, the Laboratorium Mechanicum, which was established in 1697 by the Swedish scientist and innovator Christopher Polhem. The Laboratorium Mechanicum combined education technology, a laboratory, and an exhibition space for innovations. In 1877, KTH received its current name, Kungliga Tekniska högskolan (KTH Royal Institute of Technology). The Swedish king, Carl XVI Gustaf, is the patron of KTH.

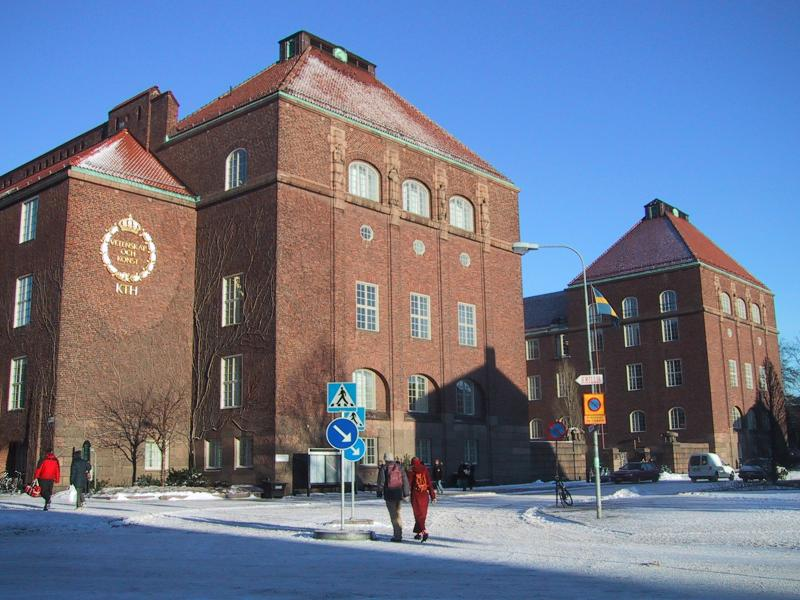
Main building in winter

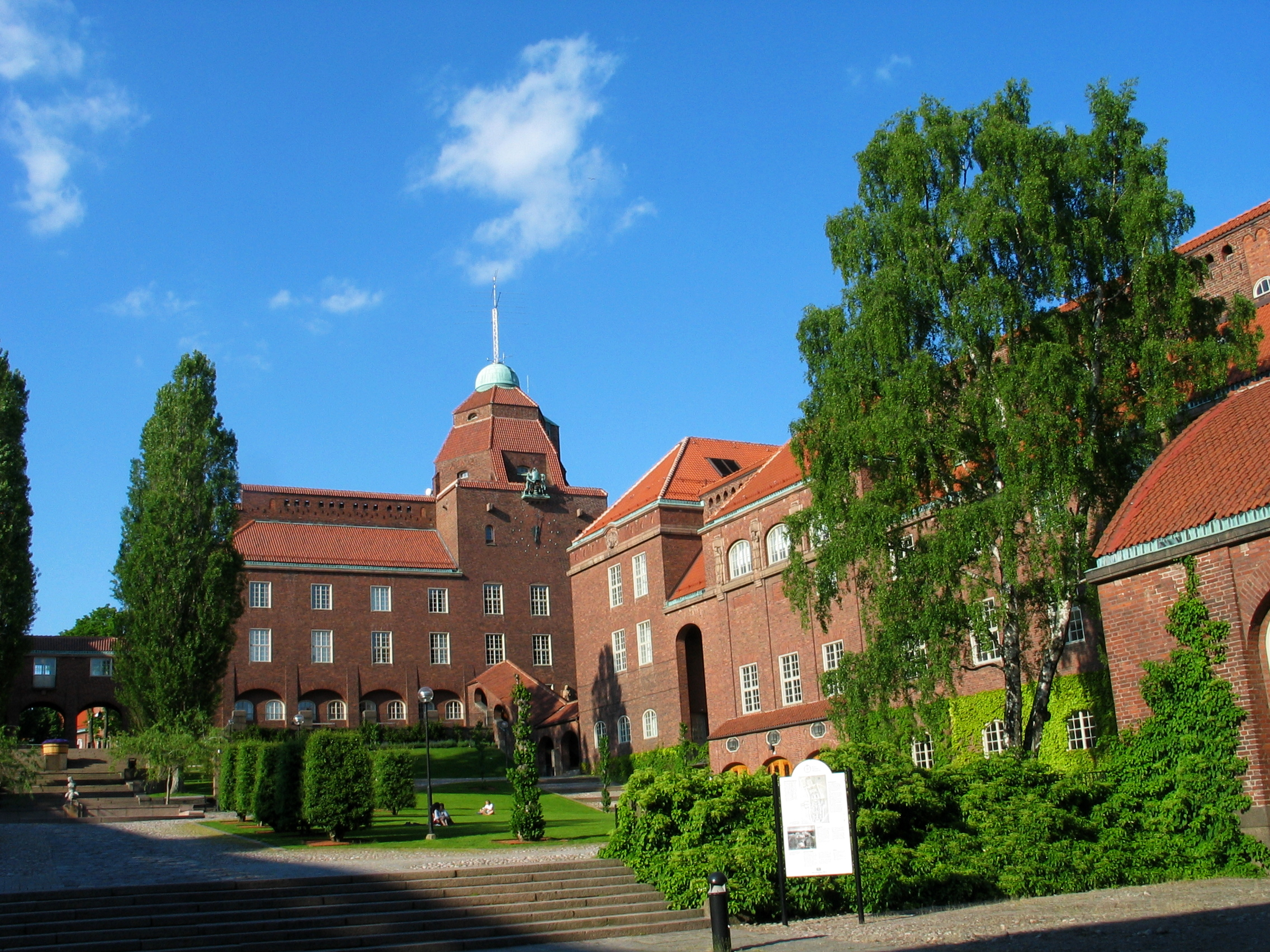
Main courtyard in summer

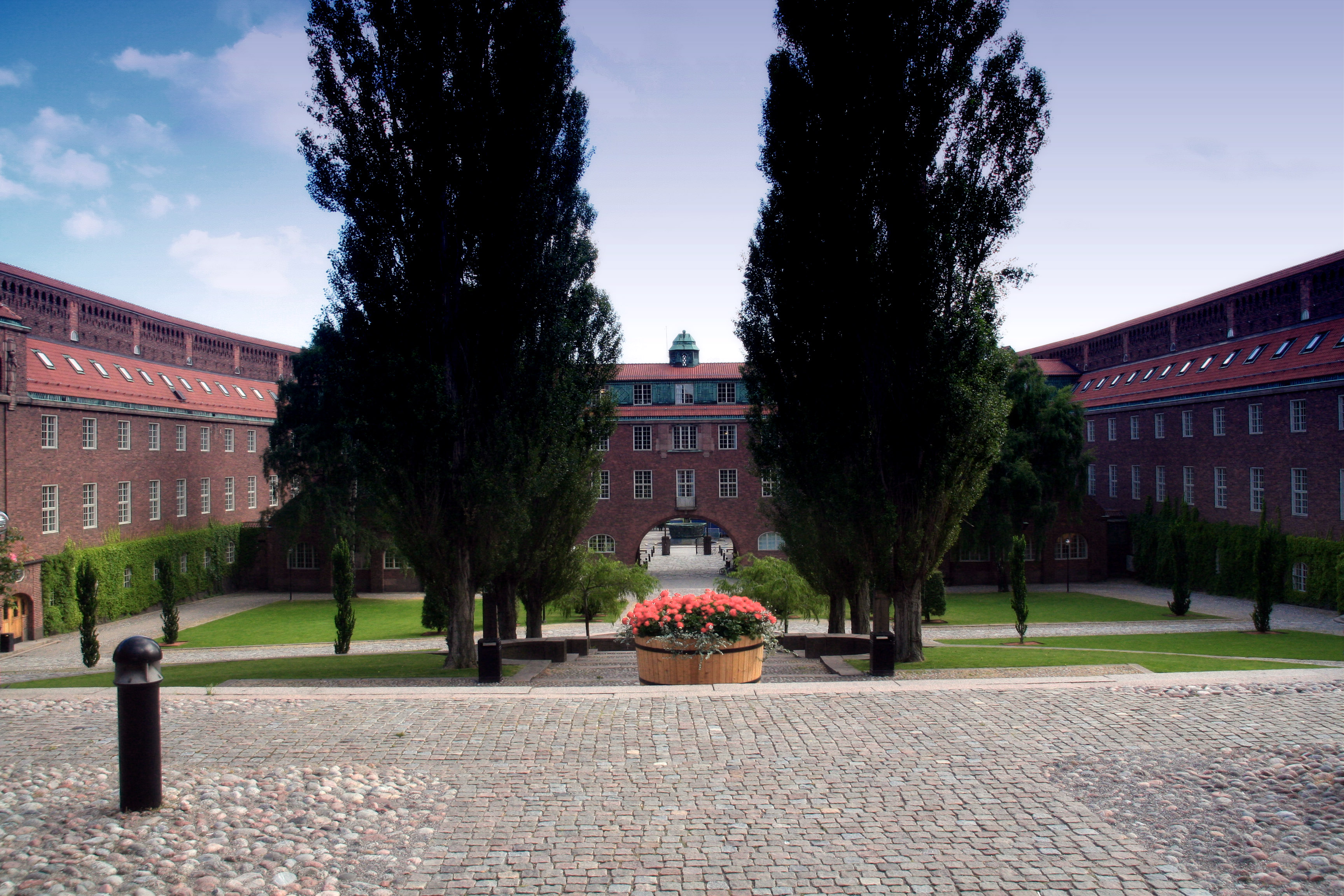
KTH "Courtyard" ("borggården") 2005

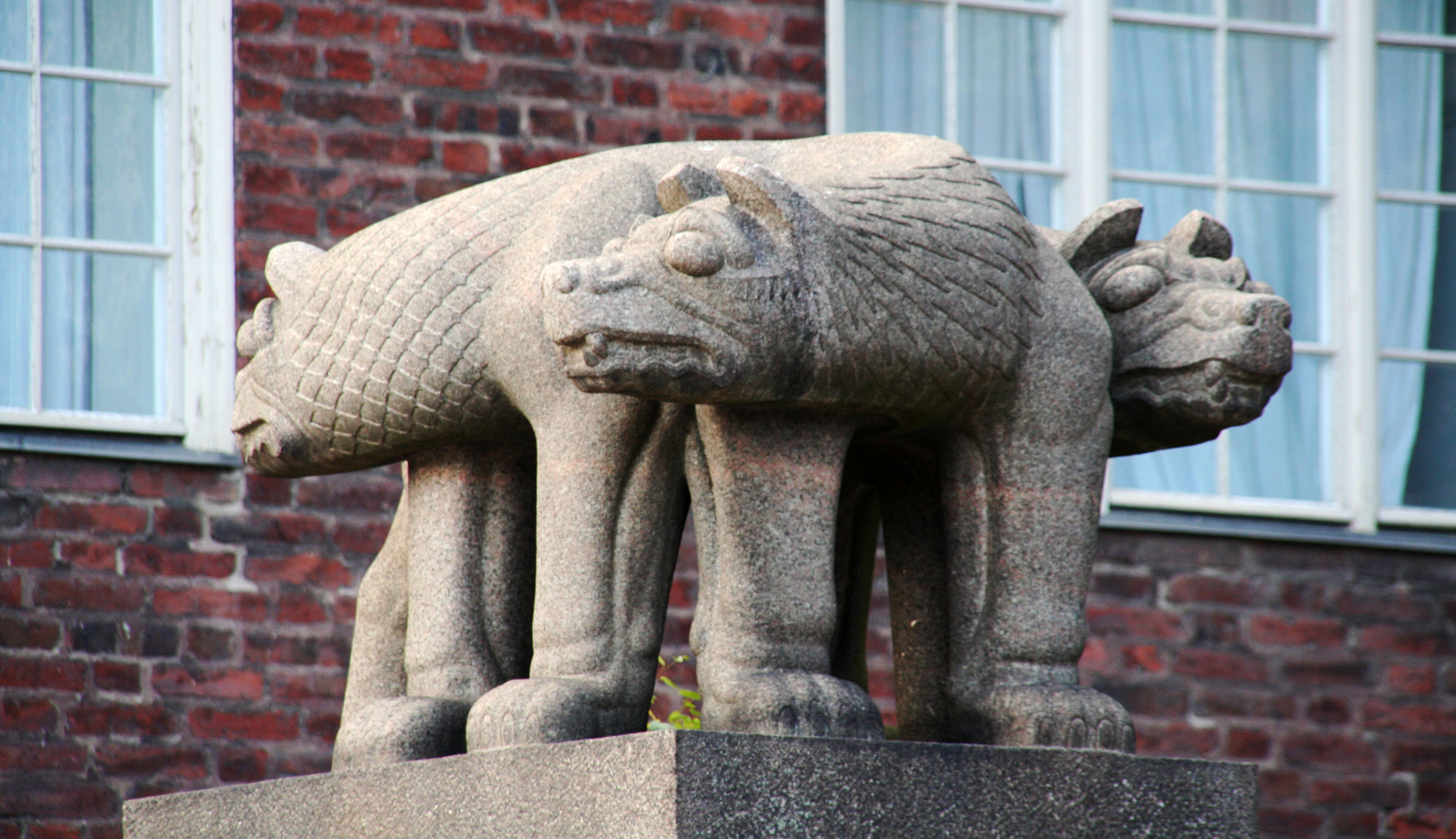
Kerberos guarding the entrance to the courtyard

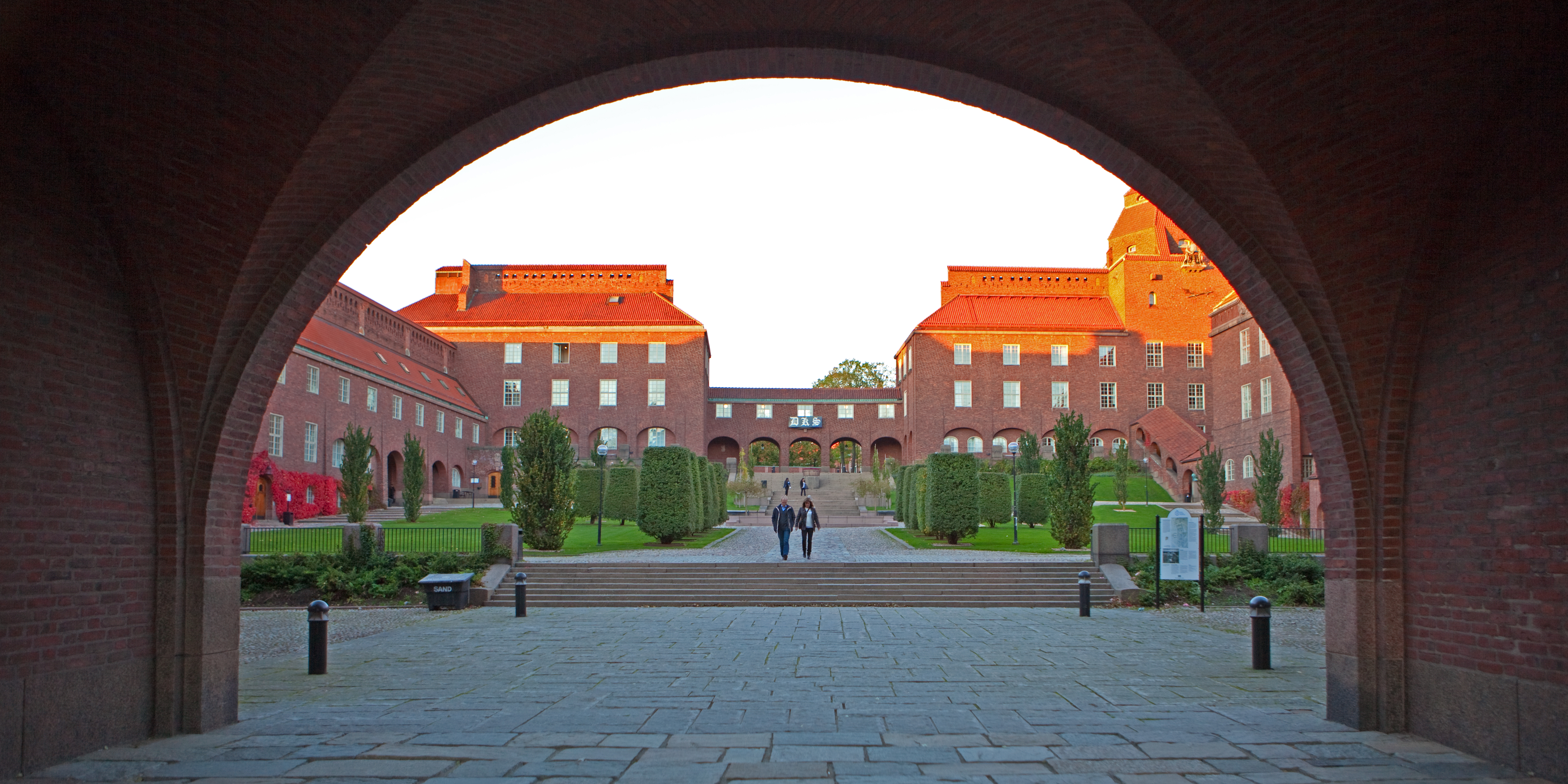
Royal Institute of Technology 2012

KTH was ranked 74th in the world among all universities in the 2025 QS World University Rankings, which was higher than any other university in the Nordic countries.

== History ==
KTH's earliest Swedish predecessor was the Laboratorium Mechanicum, a collection of mechanical models for teaching created in 1697 by Christopher Polhem. Polhem is considered to be the father of mechanics in Sweden. He founded the laboratorium as a school and research facility in the engineering field of mechanics after his extensive trips, studies and research abroad. The mechanical models that formed the basis of the education were used intermittently for teaching practical mechanics by different masters until the School of Mechanics (Mekaniska skolan) was founded in 1798. In 1827 the School of Mechanics was transformed into the Technological Institute (Teknologiska institutet), following the establishment of polytechnical schools in many European countries the early years of the 19th century, often based on the model of École polytechnique in Paris. The establishment of the Technological Institute had been ordered by King Charles XIV John on 18 May 1825; its first lecture, in mathematics, was held on 6 June 1827.

The institute had one professor in chemistry and one in physics, and one class in mechanical engineering and one in chemical engineering. During the first years, however, teaching was at a very elementary level, and more aimed at craftsmanship rather than engineering as such. The institute was also plagued by conflicts between the faculty and the founder and head of the institute, Gustaf Magnus Schwartz, who was responsible for the artisanal focus of the institute. A government committee was appointed in 1844 to solve the issues, which led to removing Schwartz in 1845. Instead, Joachim Åkerman, the head of the School of Mining in Falun and a former professor of chemistry at KTH, took over. He led a full reorganisation of the institute in 1846–1848, after which he returned to his post in Falun. An entrance test and a minimum age of 16 for students was introduced, which led to creating proper engineering training at the institute. In 1851, the engineering program was extended from two years to three.

In the late 1850s, the institute entered a time of expansion. In 1863, it received its own purpose-built buildings on Drottninggatan. In 1867, its regulations were again overhauled, to state explicitly that the institute should provide scientific training to its students. In 1869, the School of Mining in Falun was moved to Stockholm and merged with the institute. In 1871, the institute took over the civil engineering course formerly arranged by the Higher Artillery College in Marieberg.

In 1877, the name was changed into the current one, which changed KTH's status from Institute (institut) to College (högskola), and some courses were extended from three years to four. Architecture was also added to the curriculum.

In 1915, the degree titles conferred by KTH received legal protection. In the late 19th century, it had become common to use the title civilingenjör (literally "civil engineer") for most KTH-trained engineers, and not just those who studied building and construction-related subjects. The only exception was the mining engineers, which called themselves bergsingenjör ("mountain engineer"). For a while, the title civilingenjör was equal to "KTH graduate" but in 1937, Chalmers in Gothenburg became the second Swedish engineering college which were allowed to confirm these titles.

In 1917, the first buildings of KTH's new campus on Valhallavägen were completed, and still constitute its main campus.

Although the engineering education of the late 19th and early 20th century were scientifically founded, until the early 20th century, research as such was not seen as a central activity of an Institute of Technology. Those engineering graduates who went on to academic research had to earn their doctorates, typically in physics or chemistry, at a regular university. In 1927, KTH was finally granted the right to confer its own doctorates, under the designation Teknologie doktor (Doctor of Technology), and the first five doctors were created in 1929.

In 1984, the civilingenjör programs at all Swedish universities were extended from four years to 4.5. From 1989, the shorter programs in technology arranged by the municipal polytechnical schools in Sweden were gradually extended and moved into the university system, from 1989 as two-year programs and from 1995 alternatively as three-year programs. For KTH, this meant that additional campuses around the Stockholm area were added.

In 2026, KTH provides one-third of Sweden's research and engineering education.

In 2024, there were a total of 15,200 undergraduate students, 1,551 doctoral students, and 4,117 staff members at the university.

=== R1 nuclear reactor ===
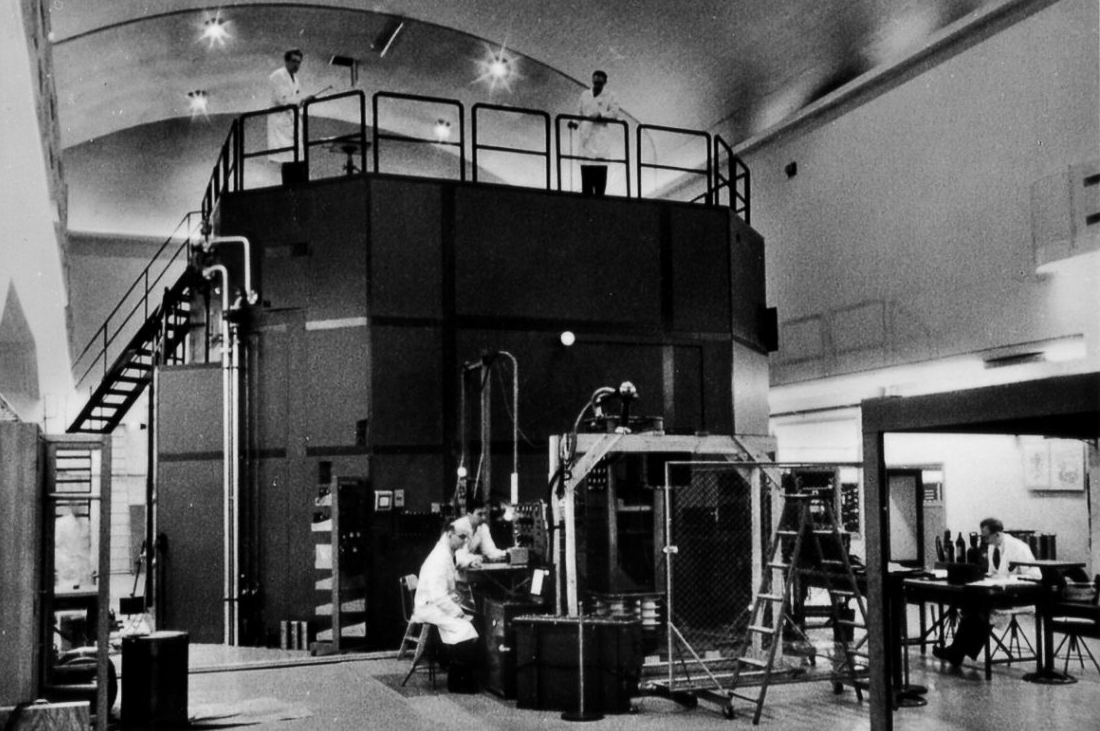
The R1 nuclear reactor.

After the American deployment of nuclear weapons at the end of World War II, the Swedish military leadership recognized the need for nuclear weapons to be thoroughly investigated and researched to provide Sweden with the knowledge to defend itself from a nuclear attack. With the mission to "make something with neutrons", the Swedish team, with scientists like Rolf Maximilian Sievert, set out to research the subject and eventually build a nuclear reactor for testing.

After a few years of basic research, they started building a 300 kW (later expanded to 1 MW) reactor, named Reaktor 1 (R1), in a reactor hall 25 meters under the surface right underneath KTH. Today this might seem ill-considered, since approximately 40,000 people lived within a 1 km radius. It was risky, but was deemed tolerable since the reactor was an important research tool for scientists at the Royal Swedish Academy of Engineering Sciences (Ingenjörsvetenskapsakademien).

At 18:59 on 13 July 1954, the reactor achieved criticality and sustained Sweden's first nuclear reaction. R1 was to be the main site for almost all Swedish nuclear research until 1970 when the reactor was finally decommissioned, mostly due to the increased awareness of the risks associated with operating a reactor in a densely populated area of Stockholm.

=== Motto ===
The motto of KTH, "Vetenskap och konst," is directly translated as "Science and Art." Here, the word konst (art) does not necessarily refer to creative art as the word typically does in its English usage. Rather, konst paired with vetenskap (science) more precisely describes the konst of putting scientific knowledge into practice; that is, through ingenjörskonst (engineering, literally "art of engineering"). Hence, another possible translation of the motto is "Science and the Art of its Application."

== Schools ==
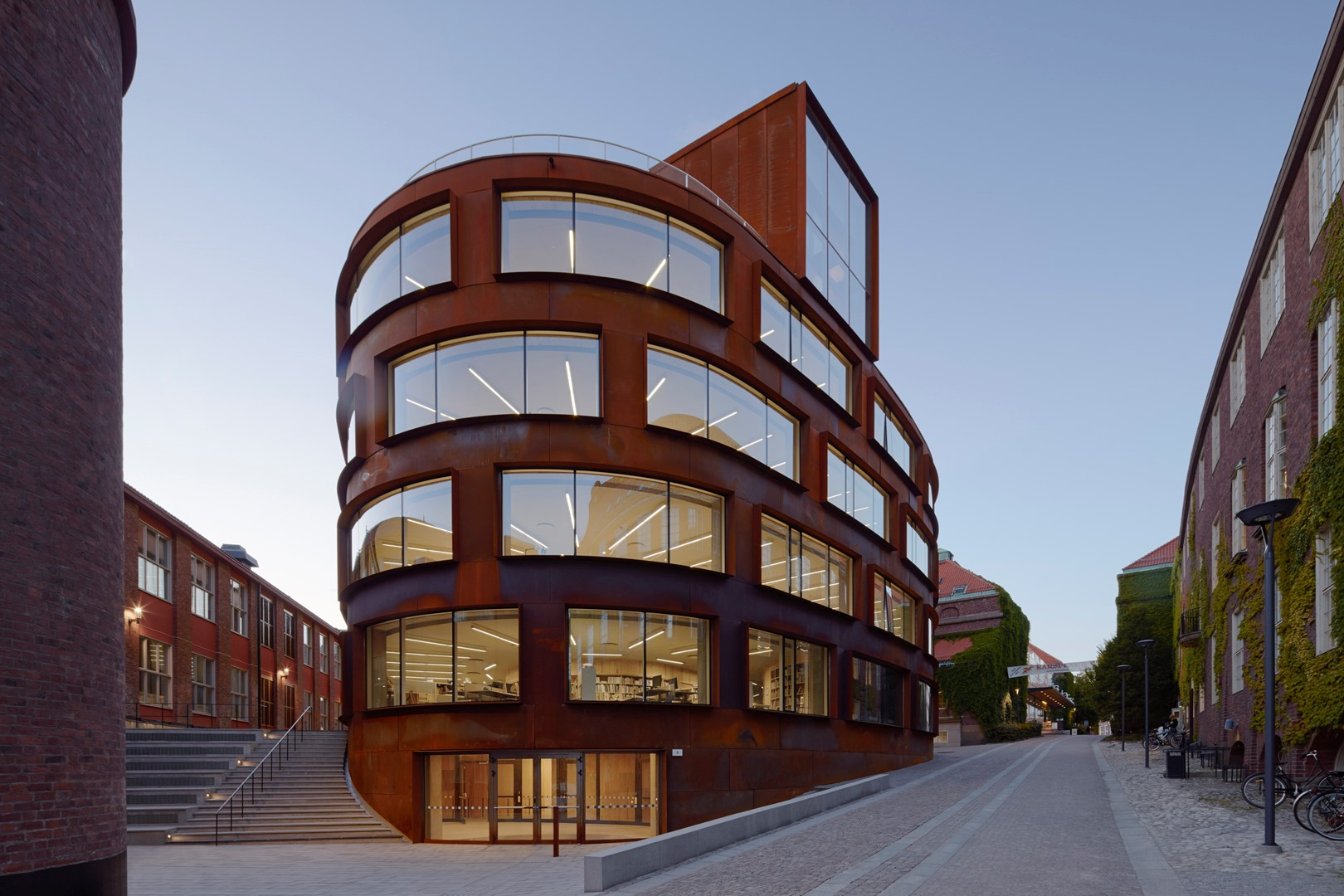
School of Architecture, built 2015 and winner of the Kasper Salin Prize

KTH is organized into five schools individually responsible for education and research activities. Each of the schools head a number of departments, centres of excellence, and study programmes. The schools are:

- School of Architecture and the Built Environment (ABE)
- School of Electrical Engineering and Computer Science (EECS)
- School of Engineering Sciences (SCI)
- School of Engineering Sciences in Chemistry, Biotechnology and Health (CBH)
- School of Industrial Engineering and Management (ITM)

The abbreviations are used officially by the university.

== International and national ranking ==
University rankings

Global – Overall
- ARWU World: 201–300 (2025)
- QS World: 78 (2026)
- THE World: =98 (2026)
- USNWR Global: =251 (2025)

=== Overall rankings ===
KTH was 78th worldwide in the QS WUR 2026, 98th worldwide in the THE WUR 2026 and 201–300th worldwide in ARWU 2025.

In its key subject area, Engineering and Technology, KTH ranked 33 world-wide in the QS World University Rankings by Subject 2026, making KTH the 5th highest ranked university in Engineering and Technology within the European Union. KTH ranked 40 world-wide within Engineering in the THE World University Rankings by Subject 2026, making KTH the 4th highest ranked university in Engineering in the European Union.

KTH was the 118th best-ranked university worldwide in 2025 in terms of aggregate performance across QS, THE, and ARWU, as reported by ARTU.

=== Subject Rankings ===
In the QS World University Rankings by Subject 2026:

Subjects (only subjects ranked within the top 100 are listed)	KTH's world rank	KTH's EU rank
Mechanical, Aeronautical and Manufacturing Engineering	20	4
Electrical and Electronic Engineering	20	3
Materials Science	24	2
Architecture and Built Environment	44	10
Chemical Engineering	51	8
Civil and Structural Engineering	51-100	9
Engineering-Chemical	58	8
Statistics and Operational Research	51–100	8
Data Science and Artificial Intelligence	51–100	7
Computer Science and Information Systems	61	6
Mathematics	62	9
Environmental Sciences	68	13
Chemistry	72	10
Physics and Astronomy	72	14
Natural Sciences	85	16

In the Times Higher Education Subject Rankings 2026:

Subjects	KTH's world rank	KTH's EU rank
Engineering & Technology	40	4
Computer Science	66	9
Physical Sciences	101–125	22

== Campuses ==
=== KTH Campus ===
KTH Campus is the main campus of KTH located in the area of Östermalm. The main buildings by architect Erik Lallerstedt, were completed in 1917. The bells of the clock-tower were completed ten years later in 1927 at the 10 year anniversary of the transformation of the School of Mechanics to the Technological Institute. The buildings and surroundings were decorated by prominent early 20th-century Swedish artists such as Carl Milles, Axel Törneman, Georg Pauli, Tore Strindberg and Ivar Johnsson. The older buildings on the campus were renovated heavily in 1994. While the original campus was large at the time of construction, KTH very soon outgrew it, and the campus has since been expanded with new buildings. KTH Campus is still the base for most of the university's operations.

=== KTH Kista ===
In the 1980s, the predecessor to the current School of Electrical Engineering and Computer Science (at KTH) located some of their operations to a campus in Kista, Stockholm. Kista is situated north of central Stockholm and is Sweden's largest corporate center and one of the most important ICT clusters in the world. The area is home to over a thousand companies in the ICT sector, for example Ericsson, Volvo, IBM, Tele2, TietoEnator, Microsoft, Intel and Oracle. Since 2025 however, the KTH Kista campus has been closed, and all of its students and faculty moved to the main KTH campus.

=== KTH Flemingsberg ===
Since 2002, the current School of Engineering Sciences in Chemistry, Biotechnology and Health (at KTH) has had a part of its activities in Flemingsberg, Stockholm. Flemingsberg is an area of high academic density and one of northern Europe's most important areas for biotechnology, both in terms of research and industrial activities. Södertörn University and the Karolinska Institute also conducts education and research in Flemingsberg, often in collaboration with KTH.

=== KTH Södertälje ===
KTH Södertälje was the southernmost and smallest KTH campus, located in the city of Södertälje. Education at KTH Södertälje was constantly developed via a close co-operation with the town's business community and in particular major Södertälje companies such as Scania and AstraZeneca. KTH offered both bachelor's and master's level courses on the campus, mainly focused on mechanical engineering, logistics, production and product development. However since 2025, KTH has elected to close down the campus, moving students and faculty to the main campus. Additionally, students who attend the foundation year program were moved to Flemingsberg.

== KTH Library ==
The library at the Royal Institute of Technology (Kungliga Tekniska högskolans bibliotek, KTHB) is Sweden's largest library for technology and basic sciences. The foundation for the library was laid in 1827, when KTH was founded in Stockholm. The main library is located on KTH's main campus in central Stockholm. The KTH library is a central academic meeting place at KTH, and an arena for collaboration. The library also has two branch libraries, in Kista and Södertälje.

KTH Library supports the academic and digital skills of students and researchers. The library promotes open access publishing and provides the university with analyses that support and make it easier to make strategic decisions. One of the goals is to increase the awareness of KTH's research. The library's main purpose is to strengthen the quality of education and research.

=== History ===
The foundation for the library was created in 1827 when the Institute of Technology was founded in Stockholm. The institute's first director, Gustav Magnus Schwartz, made a study trip to France, Germany and England, where he bought books for the institute's library. The first collection of 800 books consisted mainly of books on crafts. In 1845, Professor Joachim Åkerman became the institute's new director. During his time, the library focused entirely on scientific literature. In 1869, Falu Bergsskola was transferred to the institute, and 2 000 books in metallurgy and chemistry were incorporated into the library collection.

In 2013, KTH library was visited by US president Barack Obama.

=== The collections ===
The library currently focuses on electronic books and journals, and it is also responsible for the KTH part of DiVA, the institutional repository for research publications, where all KTH publications are collected. The library has extensive printed collections that have been built up over time. The rare books collection consists of 60,000 volumes from 1827 to 1960 and is located in the main library.

=== The building ===
The main library is housed in a building from 1917 designed by architect Erik Lallerstedt, who also designed the rest of the university's then new campus. The building was later rebuilt several times, and in the 1950s the former open courtyard was built in. During the period 2000–2002, the building was rebuilt according to drawings by architect Per Ahrbom. The extension from the 1950s was demolished and a new entrance and office building with a glass facade were erected. The courtyard is the library's central room, and the rest of the library is grouped around the courtyard. Old facades have been renovated, both towards the courtyard and towards the streets. Inside, the old part of the house has been renovated and regained much of the original architecture.

The renovation and extension of the library has won several architectural awards. In 2004, Per Ahrbom was awarded the "Helgopriset".

== Student Life ==
Students at KTH are called technologists. Traditionally, male technologists are designated as Osquar and female technologists as Quristina. The modern gender-neutral designation for this is Osquarina.

KTH students are organized into chapters, known as “sections” of the union. Each chapter represents one or more academic programmes (bachelor’s, master’s, or doctoral). Every chapter has its own governing body and is responsible for organizing reception activities for new students.

KTH’s section system dates back to when Tekniska Högskolans Studentkår (THS) was founded on January 30, 1902 as the student union for the Royal Institute of Technology. Since the union’s early years, students have been organized into sections corresponding to different fields of study, a structure intended to represent programme-specific interests and foster community among students. Some of the earliest sections include Royal Mountain Section ( B ) in 1819, Architecture Section ( A ), Royal Electrical Section ( E ), Royal Swedish Academy of Sciences ( K ), and Royal Machinery Section in 1910 ( M ). Each section is traditionally identified by a specific colour and an initial letter, which are commonly used in section names, insignia, and student attire. Members of the sections also wear coloured boilersuits during student events and celebrations, a long-standing tradition in Swedish student culture that signifies section affiliation and serves as a display for badges and markings acquired over time. In addition, many sections operate student-run pubs/chapter-houses, which function as social places and are open to KTH students. Currently, THS has 22 sections.

== Directors ==
The title was överdirektor first, then föreståndare and from the beginning of the 20th century rektor.

=== For Teknologiska institutet ===
1825–1845: Gustaf Magnus Schwartz
1845–1848: Joachim Åkerman (acting)
1848–1855: Lars Johan Wallmark
1856–1877(1890): Knut Styffe

=== For KTH ===
(1856)1877–1890: Knut Styffe
1890–1902: Gustaf Robert Dahlander (acting)
1902–1909: Anders Lindstedt
1909–1922: Carl Jacob Magnell
1922–1927: Henning Pleijel
1927–1931: Tore Lindmark
1931–1943: Henrik Kreüger
1942: Håkan Sterky, (acting)
1943–1964: Ragnar Woxén
1964–1968: Lennart Stockman
1968–1974: Göran Borg
1974–1980: Anders Rasmuson
1980–1988: Gunnar Brodin
1988–1998: Janne Carlsson
1998–2007: Anders Flodström
2007: Anders Eriksson
2007–2016: Peter Gudmundson
2016–2022: Sigbritt Karlsson
2022 -: Anders Söderholm

== Notable alumni ==
Many prominent former students have attended KTH, including:

- Salomon August Andrée, Arctic explorer
- Ernst Alexanderson, inventor
- Joe Armstrong, creator of the programming language Erlang
- Karl Johan Åström, control engineer, IEEE Medal of Honor recipient (1993)
- Kurt Atterberg, composer (graduated 1911)
- Peter Arvai, CEO and co-founder of Prezi, graduated 2006
- Karl-Birger Blomdahl, composer
- Halldóra Briem, architect
- Samir Brikho, chief executive of AMEC
- Georg Theodor von Chiewitz, architect
- Magnus Egerstedt, professor at Georgia Institute of Technology
- Daniel Ek, entrepreneur and technologist who started Spotify (did not graduate)
- Börje Ekholm, previously CEO of Investor AB and after that CEO of Ericsson AB
- Carl Daniel Ekman, pioneer in producing wood pulp for paper
- Erik Engstrom, chief executive of Reed Elsevier
- Knut Frænkel, Arctic explorer
- Christer Fuglesang, ESA astronaut, first Swedish citizen in space, physicist
- Ali Ghodsi, co-founder and CEO of Databricks
- Ivar Jacobson, inventor of sequence diagrams, and Unified Modeling Language (UML)
- Aase Schibsted Knudsen, academic and writer
- Ivar Kreuger, industrialist
- Gustaf Larson, co-founder of Volvo
- Peter Lindgren, former guitarist of Opeth
- Fredrik Ljungström, inventor, KTH Great Prize recipient
- Emma Lundberg, cell biologist, professor at KTH Royal Institute of Technology
- Dolph Lundgren, actor
- Carl Munters, inventor
- Immanuel Nobel, inventor and industrialist
- Claudia Olsson, founder and CEO of Stellar Capacity
- Helge Palmcrantz, inventor
- Kristin Persson, materials scientist, Founder of The Materials Project
- Baltzar von Platen, inventor
- Maja Reichard, Paralympian
- Tinga Seisay, diplomat
- Max Tegmark, full professor of cosmology at Massachusetts Institute of Technology
- Inger Thorén (née Bildt), Swedish engineer and food chemist, in 1938, the first woman assistant appointed at KTH.
- Almida de Val, Olympian
- Gunnar Widforss, Swedish-American artist
- Greta Woxén (née Westberg) Sweden's first female civil engineer when she graduated in 1928.
- Niklas Zennström, co-founder of Skype

== Notable faculty ==
- Hannes Alfvén, Nobel Prize laureate and plasma physicist (1908–1995)
- Lennart Carleson, Abel Prize laureate
- Carl-Gunne Fälthammar, plasma physicist
- Hilding Faxén, former professor of mechanics and known for Faxén's law in fluid dynamics
- Elena Gutierrez-Farewik, professor of biomechanics
- Sven Ove Hansson
- Johan Håstad, two-time Gödel Prize winner
- Arne Kaijser
- Ari Laptev, professor of mathematics at KTH and chair in pure mathematics at Imperial College London, president of the European Mathematical Society
- Peter Pohl, author and university lecturer in numerical analysis, joint recipient of the 1992 August Prize (Augustpriset)
- Kai Siegbahn, Nobel Prize laureate and physicist (1918–2007)
- Stanislav Smirnov, Fields Medal winner
- Subra Suresh, former guest professor, director of the National Science Foundation, professor of engineering at Massachusetts Institute of Technology
- Erik Hallén, physicist and electrical engineer, Professor of Electromagnetic Theory

== KTH Great Prize ==
KTH Great Prize is a prize annually awarded by KTH. The distributed amount was SEK 1,200,000 in 2019.

The prize is awarded to:

- A person who invented significant innovative applications of scientific knowledge in practical areas,
- A person who, through scientific research, found particularly valuable principles or methods useful for applications,
- A person who, through artistic efforts, has exercised a powerful influence on the soul and life of people.

The recipient of the award must also be a Swedish citizen. Usually, the prize is awarded to a single prize winner, but it has happened that two or three prize winners have shared the prize. The list of recipients is at KTH:s stora pris.

== International links ==
KTH has been awarded the title "European University" by the European Commission. Together with six other European technical universities, KTH has formed the alliance UNITE! (University Network for Innovation, Technology and Engineering). The aim of the network is to create a trans-European campus, to introduce trans-European curricula, to promote scientific cooperation between the members and to strengthen knowledge transfer between the countries. The alliance includes the Technische Universität Darmstadt, Aalto University, KTH, the Polytechnic University of Turin, the Polytechnic University of Catalonia and the University of Lisbon.

== See also ==
- Blandaren
- List of universities in Sweden
- List of forestry universities and colleges
- ESDP-Network
- Top Industrial Managers for Europe
