= Agneta Marell =

Swedish educator

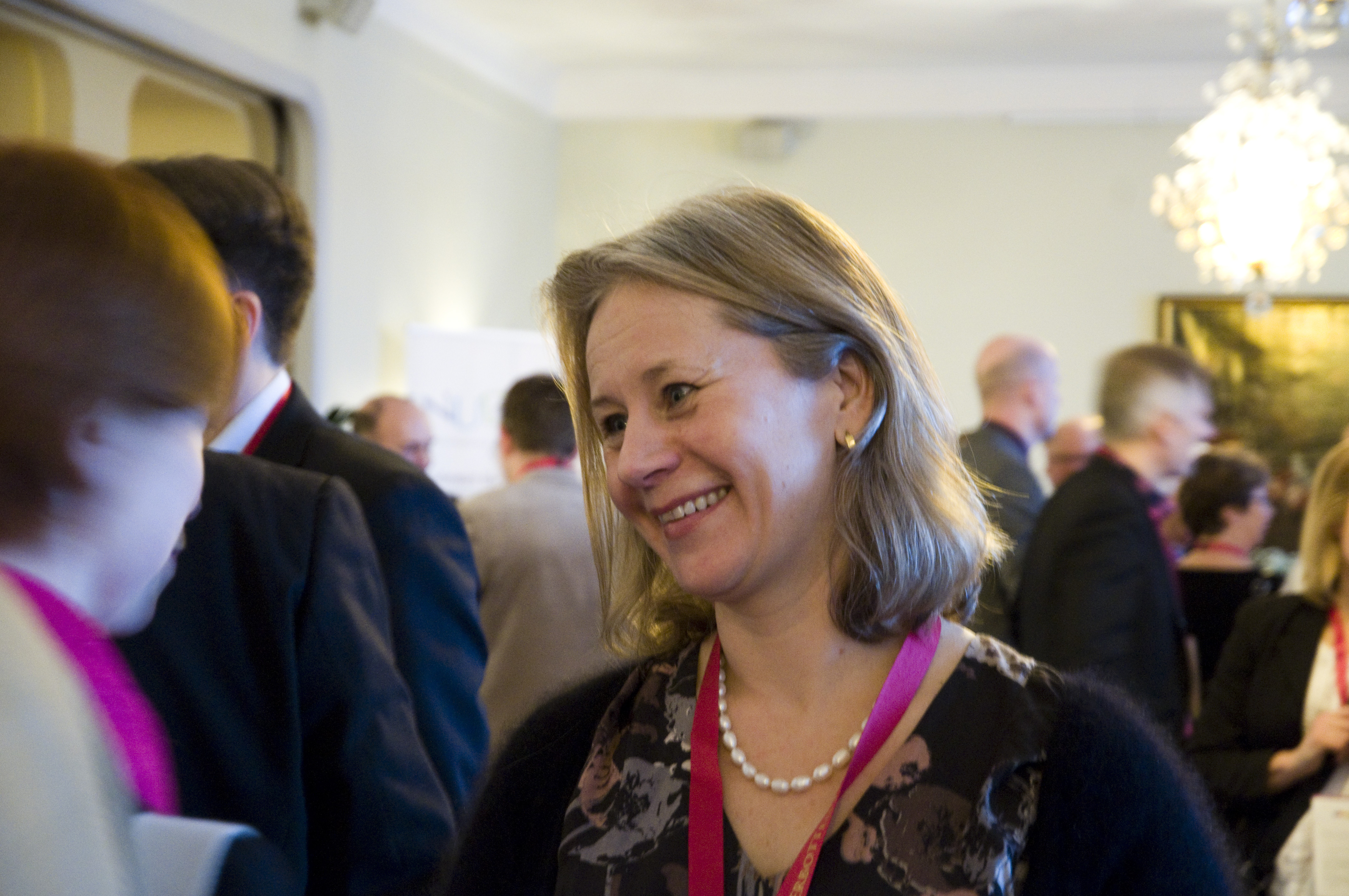
Agneta Marell 2012.

Agneta Marell (born 1964 in Gothenburg, Sweden) is professor in Business Administration and since 2010, Deputy vice-chancellor for external relations and innovation at Umeå University in northern Sweden. Between 2004 and 2007, she was the dean of Umeå School of Business, succeeding Anders Söderholm. In 2008–2011, she was a municipal manager for Örnsköldsvik municipality. She received the assignment as vice-president for collaboration and innovation at Umeå University. As such, she was also chairman of Uminova Holding, the business incubator Uminova Innovation AB and Uminova eXpression AB, which runs Sliperiet at the Umeå Arts Campus.

In April 2016, she was appointed by the Swedish government to the board of Jönköping University for the period May 1, 2016, to April 30, 2017.

In 2017, Agneta Marell became president at Jönköping University. She held the position until 28 March 2024.

In 2021, she was elected as a member of Connect Sweden's Board of Directors, while maintaining her position at Jönköping University.

== Research ==
Marell graduated in Business Administration 1991, and finished her doctoral thesis in 1998. Her dissertation focused on consumer behaviour and transport psychology. She has also been studying at Columbia University in New York, and Kellogg School of Management at Northwestern University in Chicago.

== Selected books (in English) ==
- Marell, Agneta (1995). "Environmentally friendly replacement of automobiles". Journal of Economic Psychology. 16 (3). Amsterdam : North-Holland, 1981-: 513–529. doi:10.1016/0167-4870(95)00024-I. ISSN 0167-4870.
- Marell Molander, Agneta (1998), The household decision making process in replacement of durable goods, Studier i företagsekonomi. Serie B, 0346–8291; 41, Umeå: Umea University, ISBN 91-7191-501-X
- Marell, Agneta; Wahlund, Richard (1998), Attitudes toward the Euro and the EMU in Sweden and in the other EU countries: international comparisons, Working paper series / Foundation for Distribution Research, Stockholm School of Economics, 1103–1794; 18, Stockholm: Fonden
- Marell, Agneta; Jansson, Johan; Nordlund, Annika (2010). "Green consumer behavior : Determinants of curtailment and eco-innovation adoption". Journal of Consumer Marketing. 27 (4). Paramus: Grayson Associates: 358–370. doi:10.1108/07363761011052396. ISSN 0736-3761.

== See also ==
Agneta Marell, Deputy Vice-Chancellor at Umeå University

Academic offices
Preceded by Anders Söderholm	Rector of Umeå School of Business; 2004–2007	Succeeded by Lars Lindbergh
Preceded by Ulf Edlund	Deputy vice-chancellor of Umeå University; 2010–2016	Succeeded by Dieter Müller
Preceded by Jan Åke Jonsson	Foundation Governing Board of Jönköping University; 2016–present	Incumbent
