= Umeå School of Business =

Business school of Umeå University

Coordinates: 63.8206°N 20.3036°E

Umeå School of Business, Economics and Statistics
- Handelshögskolan vid Umeå Universitet
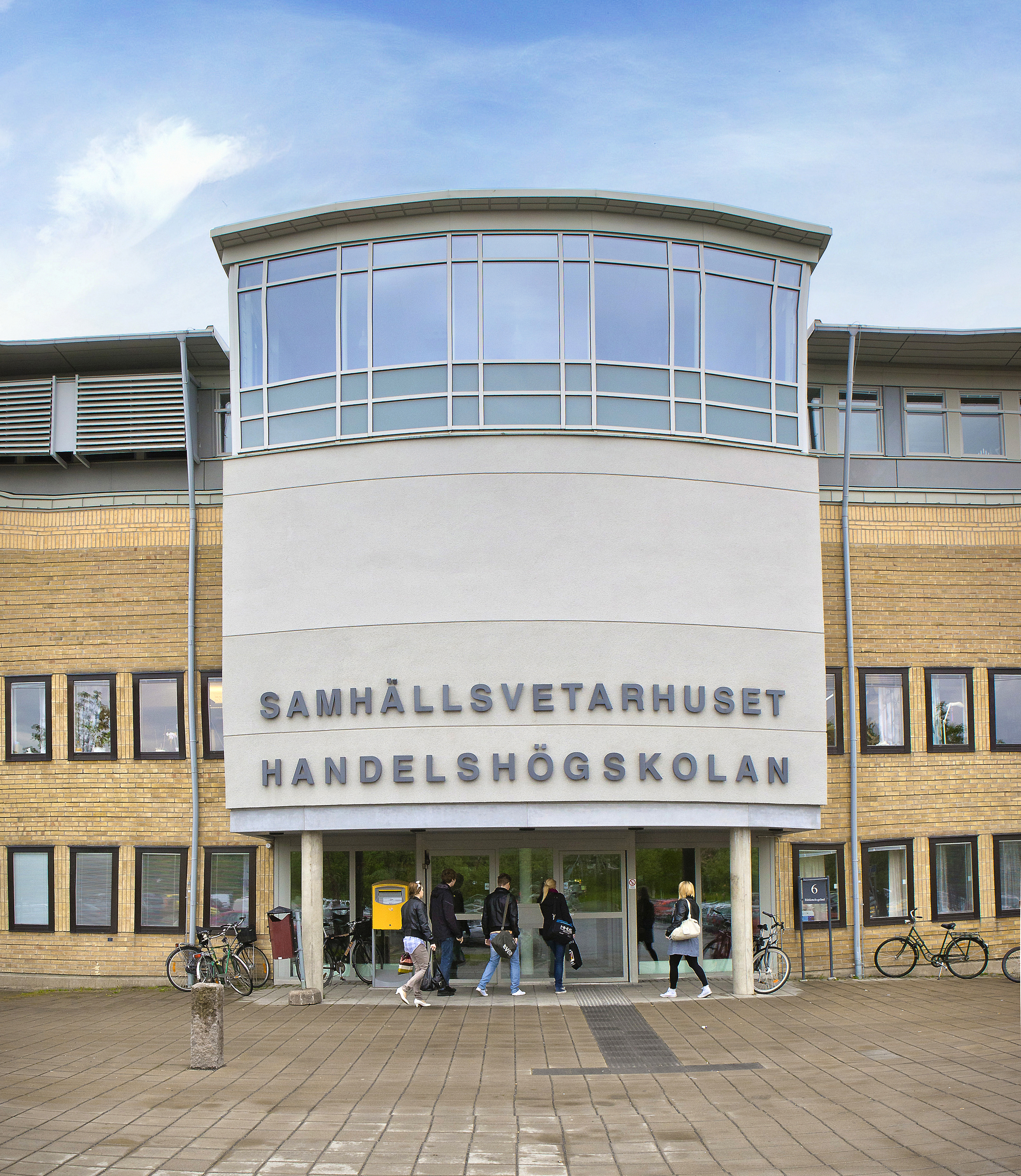
- Type: Public University
- Established: 1989
- Parent institution: Umeå University
- Accreditation: GBSN, EQUIS, EFMD, EIASM
- Rector: Sofia Lundberg
- Administrative staff: 250
- Students: 2,000
- Undergraduates: 1,500
- Postgraduates: 500
- Doctoral students: 90
- Location: Umeå, Sweden
- Campus: Urban
- Website: USBE

The Umeå School of Business, Economics and Statistics, USBE, or Handelshögskolan vid Umeå Universitet, is the business school of Umeå University in the north of Sweden, founded in 1989 "to strengthen education in research and business while contributing to the community". About 2000 students currently study at USBE. The School offers one Bachelor program, four undergraduate programs (Civilekonomprogram), seven Master's degree programs (including the Erasmus Mundus Master Program in Strategic Project Management) and doctoral programs.

The International atmosphere is important to the business school and it offers one undergraduate program (the International Business Program) and all Master's programs and doctoral programs entirely in English. USBE also accept many international students as exchange or degree students.

USBE is located at the very heart of the University campus, a meeting-place for all academic disciplines, improving its opportunities to co-operate across traditional academic boundaries. It also gives USBE-students an opportunity to take an active part of student environment created for the 37 000 students at Umeå University.

== Organization ==
Umeå School of Business, Economics and Statistics has three departments: the Department of Business Administration, the Department of Economics and the Department of Statistics.

=== USBE Career Center ===
USBE Career Center concentrates primarily on helping its graduates in the transition between graduation and the business world.

== Research ==
Within the Umeå School of Business, Economics and Statistics, the Umeå Research Institute promotes research and awards funding to prospective researchers. The School also hosts a group dedicated to research on decision-making in extreme environments. It is named Triple Ed (Research Group on Extreme Environments – Everyday Decisions).

== Education ==
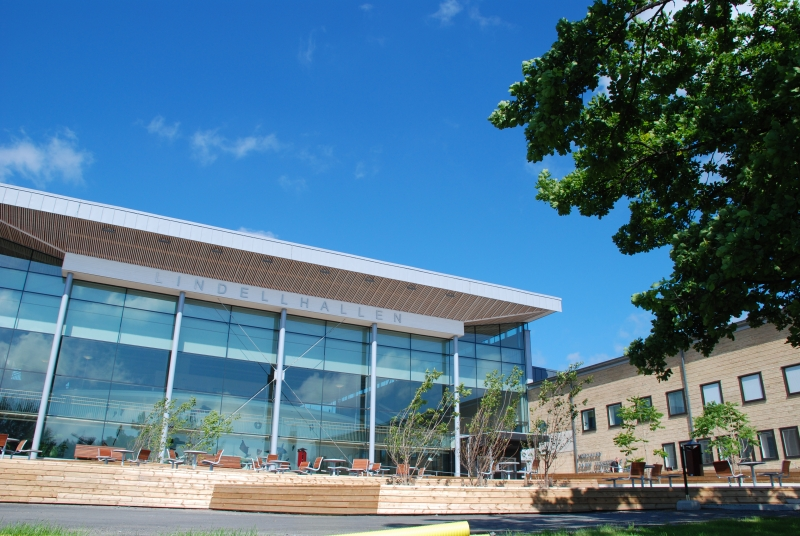
Lindellhallen at Umea University

=== Master's programs ===
- Master's Program in Accounting
- Master's Program in Finance
- Master's Program in Business Development and Internationalization
- Master's Program in Management
- Master's Program in Marketing
- Master's Program in Economics
- Master's Program in Statistical Sciences
- Masters in Strategic Project Management (European): offered jointly with Heriot-Watt University and Politecnico di Milano Erasmus Mundus

=== Undergraduate programs ===
- International Business Program (in English)
- Business Administration and Economics Program (in Swedish)
- Retail and Supply Chain Management Program (in Swedish)
- Service Managementprogramet (in Swedish)
- Bachelor's Program in Statistics

== Notable alumni ==
=== Students ===
- Linus Berg – founder and CEO of "Rest & Fly"
- Frida Berglund – founder of the popular blog "Husmusen"
- Wilhelm Geijer – former CEO and board member of Öhrlings PricewaterhouseCoopers
- Christian Hermelin – CEO, Fabege
- Leif Lindmark – former rector, Stockholm School of Economics
- Agneta Marell – professor of business administration
- Henrik P. Molin – author
- Göran Carstedt – Leading the global network "Society for Organizational Learning"
- Malin Moström – Swedish woman footballer, nominated best in Sweden and the world
- Lars Petterson – CEO, Atea Sweden
- Erik Wikström – CEO, Pizzeria Viking chain

=== Honorary doctors ===
- Carl Kempe – Swedish businessman
- Robert H. Haveman – professor
- Lars Heikensten – former governor of the Swedish Riksbank

== International partnerships ==
USBE has over 70 partner universities all over the world, including:

- Norwegian School of Management - BI
- NHH – Norges Handelshögskola
- Helsinki School of Economics and Business Administration
- School of Management, Fudan University, Shanghai
- Katholieke Universiteit Leuven
- Tilburg University
- University of Groningen
- Grenoble Ecole de Management
- KEDGE Business School
- NEOMA Business School
- ICN Business School
- Athens University of Economics and Business
- Warsaw School of Economics
- Politecnico di Milano
- Universität Zürich
- Universidade de São Paulo
- Hanken School of Economics
- ESC Rennes School of Business

== See also ==
- HHUS -The Student Association at USBE
- Umeå University
- List of business schools in Europe
- List of business schools in Scandinavia
- Business school
- MBA
- Gothenburg School of Economics and Commercial Law
- Stockholm School of Economics
- Lund School of Economics and Management
