= Quality Standards Illustrated =

The eighth edition of the Quality Standards (QSI) (published by the Architectural Woodwork Institute) is a major revision in a line of Standards extending back to 1961.

== Eighth edition ==
There are a number of changes in the layout of the eighth edition.

The content gives an insight into the scope of fine architectural woodwork. Sections 100 and 200 refer to the raw materials of the trade; which include lumber, wood veneers, overlays like laminates, and the cores to which these products are attached. Sections 300 through 1400 are product sections, each devoted to the details of materials and workmanship for that wide range of work. Section 1500 is a newly revised factory finishing section. Section 1600 addresses a generic method of specifying institutional cabinetry, and Section 1700 concerns installation. These sections are accessed by black thumb tab indicators.

From 1961, it was recognized that there were different levels of work required. The original committee chose the word grade to express those levels: "Premium Grade", "Custom Grade", and "Economy Grade". They are defined explicitly on page 6 of the eighth edition and are taken up throughout the book. The raw materials of the trade are not specified using those grade terms, rather, by selecting a grade of work for the fabricated product, the quality of the materials is specified.

The selection of materials appropriate for the AWI grade of work, and the workmanship and joinery requirements for each type of architectural woodwork are spelled out in Sections 300 through 1400, the selections and specifications are in sections 1500, Factory Finishing; 1600, Modular Cabinets; and 1700, Installation.
