= Agnete Hegelund =

Danish fashion model (born 1988)

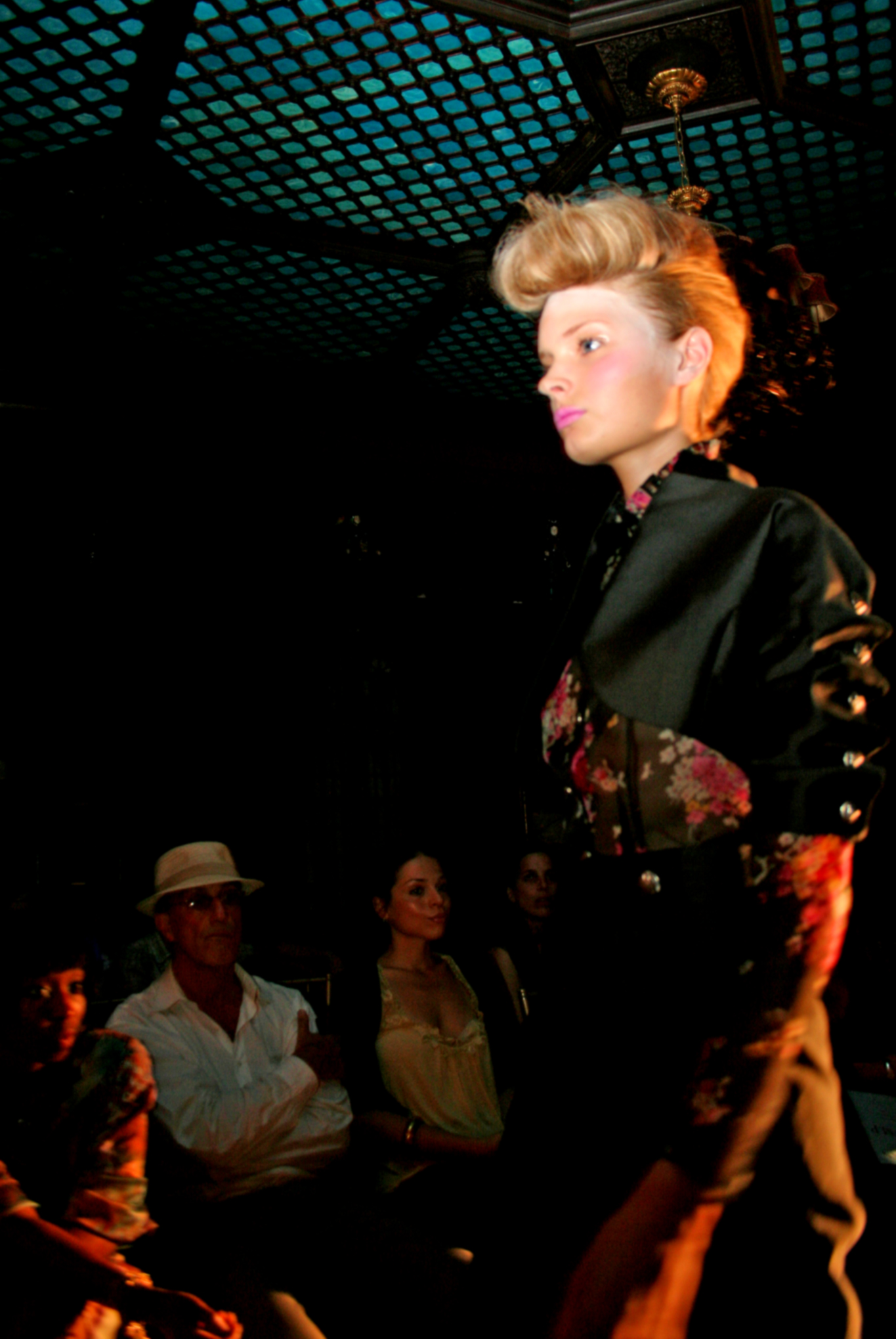
- Hegelund modeling in Ruffian spring 2008 show, New York Fashion Week, September 2007.
- Born: 10 March 1988 (age 37); Odense, Denmark
- Modeling information
- Height: 178 cm / 5 ft 9 1/2 in
- Hair color: Blonde
- Eye color: Blue
- Agency: Women Management Milan, Next Paris, Models 1 London, IMM Brussels, Le Management Copenhagen & Stockholm

Agnete Hegelund Hansen (born 10 March 1988) is a Danish fashion model. She has modeled in fashion shows for designers Burberry Prorsum, Christian Lacroix, Diane von Fürstenberg, Dolce & Gabbana, Givenchy, Marni, among others.

== Modeling career ==
Hegelund was discovered while shopping in Copenhagen in November 2005, and signed with Ford Models that same month. Two weeks later she appeared on her first cover for German Elle magazine.

In 2008 Hegelund was photographed several times by Steven Meisel, including the cover of Vogue Italia in February 2008. and advertising campaigns for Calvin Klein Ck Jeans, Pringle of Scotland, Anna Sui and Alberta Ferretti.

Hegelund appeared in the March 2011 British Harper's Bazaar editorial, photographed by Jonas Bresnan.
