= Agneta Matthes =

Dutch entrepreneur

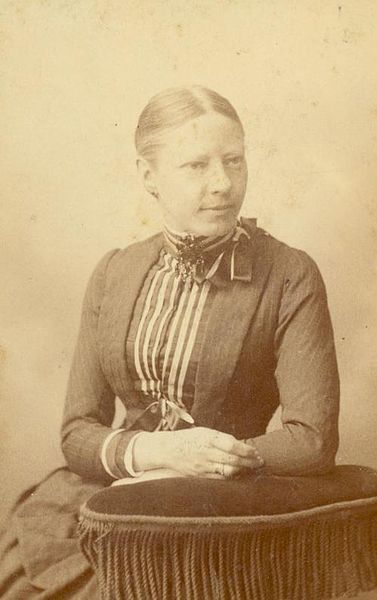
- Matthes in 1880
- Born: Agneta Wilhelmina Johanna Matthes; 4 October 1847; Amsterdam, Netherlands
- Died: 5 October 1909 (aged 62); Delft, Netherlands
- Occupation: Entrepreneur
- Spouse: Jacques van Marken (m. 1869; died 1906)

Agneta Wilhelmina Johanna van Marken-Matthes (4 October 1847 – 5 October 1909) was a Dutch entrepreneur. She and her husband Jacques van Marken were involved in the manufacture of yeast throughout their lives, and were engaged in the co-operative movement, taking care of their workers. Matthes and Van Marken created living quarters for workers in her hometown, Delft in South Holland, named Agnetapark after her. These are considered a model for the co-operative development and construction of garden cities (self-contained communities) for workers. Matthes founded and ran a Delft perfume factory, Maison Neuve, to take advantage of a by-product from the yeast factory.

== Life ==
=== Family and childhood ===
Agneta Wilhelmina Johanna Matthes was born on 4 October 1847 in Amsterdam in the Netherlands. Agneta Matthes was the daughter of Jan Willem Frederik Matthes, an insurance agent. She and her sister, Sara Elizabeth Marken-Matthes (1849–1902), grew up in upper middle-class circumstances. Matthes was taught privately, and spent 1862 to 1864 in Utrecht in a boarding school. When she returned to Amsterdam, she studied piano and dance, and took art classes and religious instruction. Matthes' sister Sara Elizabeth, who was affectionately known as Nora, married Zionist politician Arnold Kerdijk (1846–1907), the founder of the Free-thinking Democratic League, in 1876. He was a Member of the House of Representatives of the Netherlands between 1877 and 1901. Sara Elizabeth and Arnold lived at the Spoorsingel in Delft and had four children. Agneta maintained a close relationship with them, Nora named her first-born daughter after her sister "Agneta".

=== Marriage ===
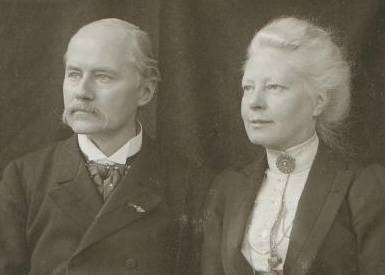
The couple in 1890

In 1865, Agneta met Jacob Cornelis van Marken, known as Jacques, who studied technology and sociology at the Polytechnical School of Delft, a precursor of the Delft University of Technology. During his studies he took a study tour to Austria-Hungary and found a new method of producing yeast, which fascinated him. Later, when he heard a baker in Delft complain about the varying quality and poor availability of yeast in the Netherlands, he recalled the method which he learnt during his tour, and decided to produce industrial baker's yeast of consistently high quality.

On 7 October 1869 the couple married just before the first yeast factory in the Netherlands, the Nederlandsche Gist & Spiritusfabriek NV, opened. The factory is now part of the multinational chemical company Koninklijke DSM. Jacques van Marken is regarded as one of the Dutch pioneers in the development of industrial food production because of his concept of factory production.

Their marriage was registered in the Delft population register on 10 November 1869. Their first home was a modest apartment on a canal, but they moved frequently after that. As of 2012, all of their homes are still standing and all are classified as historic buildings. Their last home, to which they moved on 3 June 1885, was a villa in Agnetapark, Delft. When Matthes learnt that their marriage would be childless, she decided to dedicate her life to her husband's business and career, and participated in the establishment and management operation. She accompanied her husband to the factory every day, having her own office. She also continued to have private lessons. In addition to administrative activities, their main interests were personnel policy issues. Matthes and van Marken maintained close contact with the employees of the factory and their families, which appealed to the couple's sense of community; they wanted to be part "of a larger whole". Agneta Matthes shared her husband's belief in progress, and they both promoted the personal development of their employees.

=== Husband's infidelity and children ===
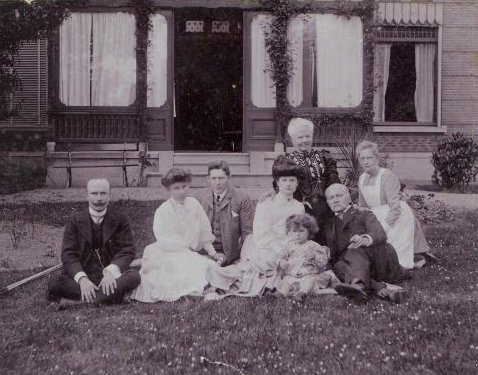
The couple van Marken 1904, with extended family including the illegitimate children of Jacques van Marken. From left to right: Jacob Cornelis Eringaard (son), Clara Eringaard (daughter) with her husband, EJW Johanknegt (wife of Cornelis), Erry Anna Eringaard (daughter), Agneta van Marken-Matthes, Jacques van Marken, and an unknown nanny

In 1886, when Jacques van Marken was in France at a spa, Agneta Matthes found a letter from Maria Eringaard requesting the child support that he owed for their children, which led to Matthes discovering that her husband had begun a relationship with Eringaard in 1871 when she was aged 15, and that he had four children by her. Matthes solved the financial problems discreetly. She did not tell van Markem that she knew about the affair until 1889, when Eringaard died of tuberculosis, as had two of her children.

Van Marken and Matthes took care of the three surviving children, Cornelis, Clara, both adolescents, and Anna, a young child. Officially they were foster children, but it was an open secret (officially secret but widely known) in Dutch society that van Marken was their father. With the consent of Matthes, van Marken planned to adopt them, but his religious father vetoed the adoption. Jacob Cornelis Eringaard, the eldest illegitimate son of van Marken, later headed the Gist & Spiritusfabriek and pursued the social interests of his father and his wife. The daughter of Jacob Cornelis, Erry Anna Eringaard, was married in 1932 to the diplomat and publisher Daniel Johannes von Balluseck (1895–1976).

== Activities and services ==
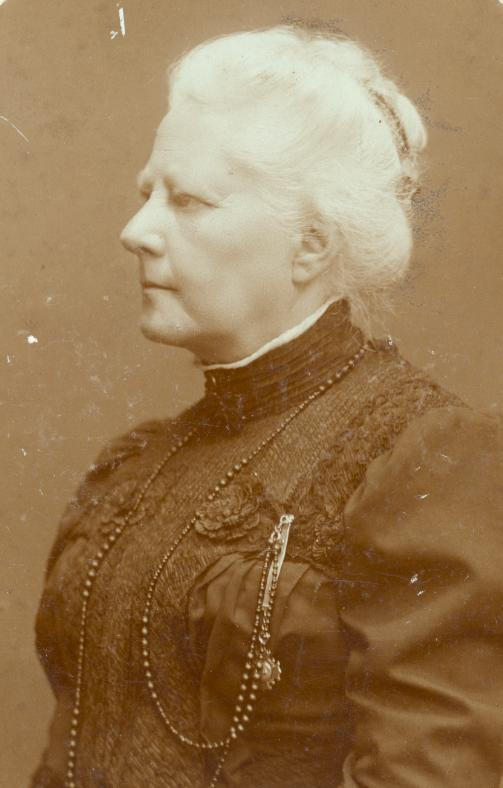
Agneta Matthes in 1900

=== Legal situation and sources of information ===
Because legally, married women were required to have the approval of their husbands to do business, Agneta Matthes acted "for and on behalf" of her husband. Also because of this, extensive records of the business ventures and career of Jacques van Marken exist, while only a few sources mention the activities of Matthes. It is unclear, therefore, to what extent Agneta was responsible for ideas. She undoubtedly had operational control of the perfume factory, Maison Neuve. She undertook an empirical analysis of the housing needs of 48 working families, equipped Agnetapark significantly, and was influential at least during the early years in the management of her husband's other companies, especially in matters of personnel.

=== Start-ups ===
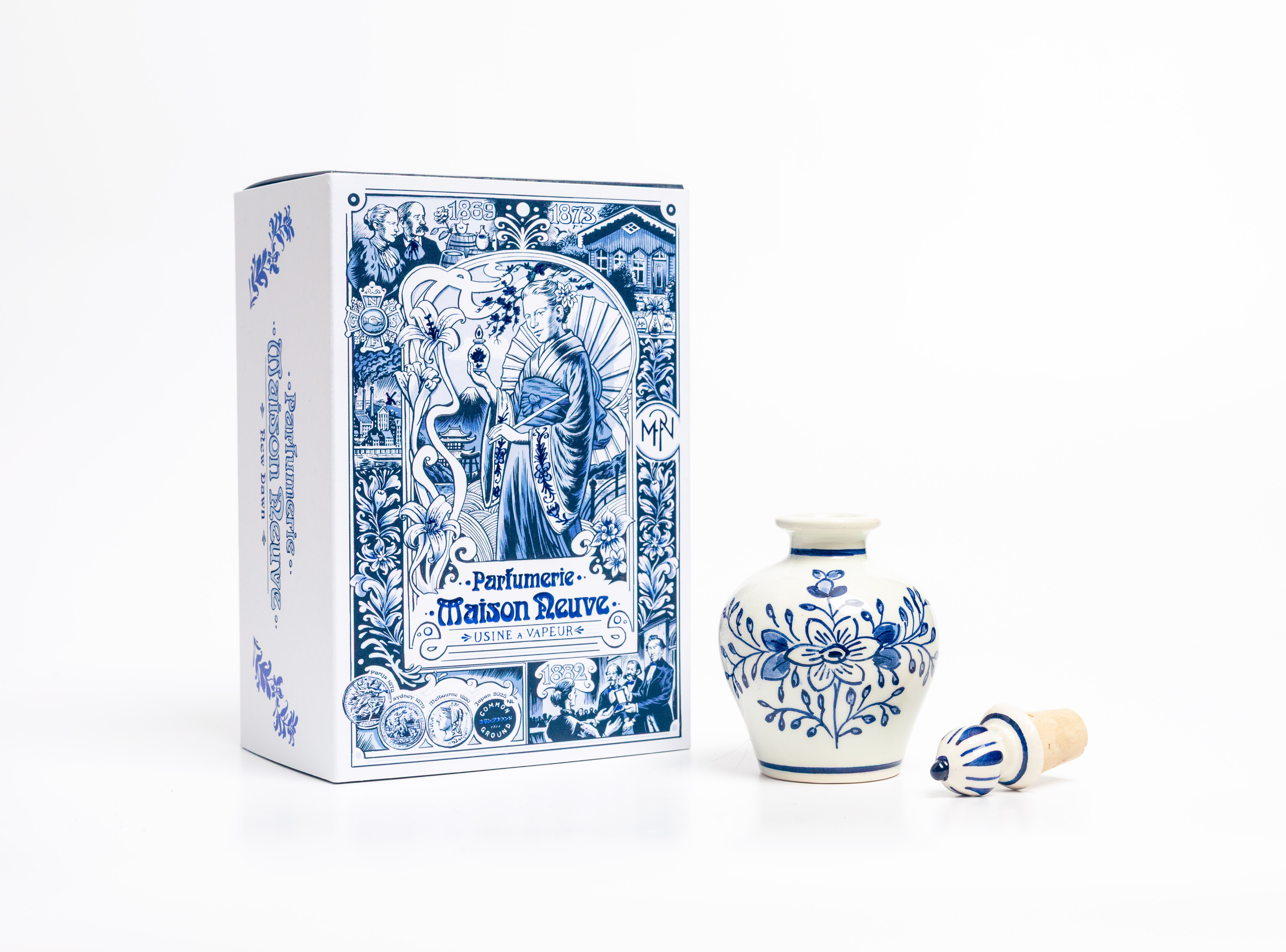
Perfume bottle PMN (model 1880) produced for Expo 2025 Osaka, Japan.

Matthes and van Marken, who was called a welfare engineer by his contemporaries, developed a premium wage system for his factory workers of the Nederlandsche Gist & Spiritusfabriek NV (1869), under which all employees could receive bonuses of two to 20 percent of their salary in addition to their basic salary "for good work and because of zeal". The company paid up to ten percent of its profits as a dividend to its employees. In 1880, the engineer, Gerhard Knuttel, a grandnephew of van Marken, established a "Concerns van het Personeel" (human resources management), the first such institution in the Netherlands. Due to van Marken's health problems, François Gerard Waller, his nephew, was entrusted with the management of the factory in 1886.

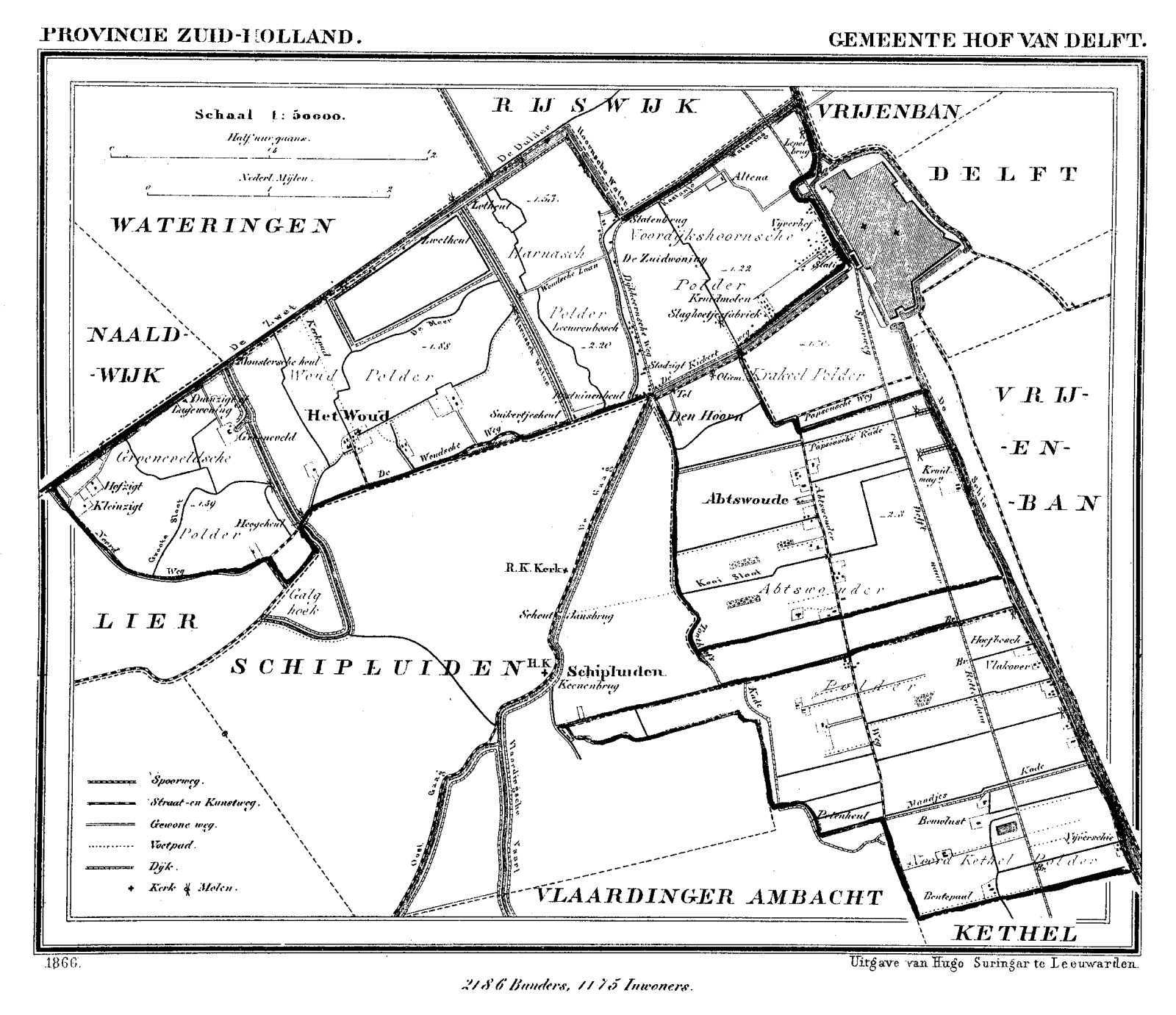
Hof van Delft, now a part of Delft

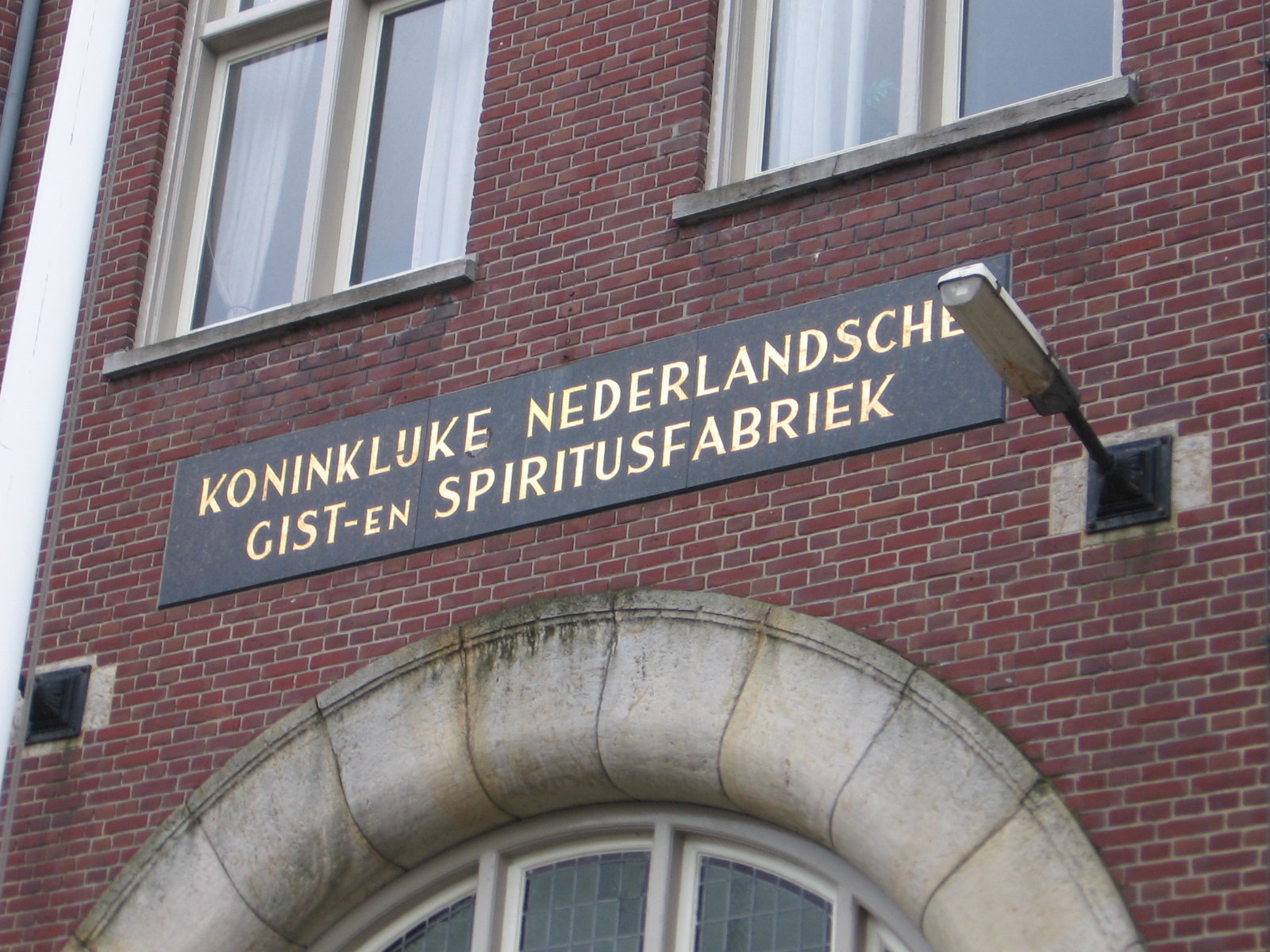
Main building of the Nederlandsche Gist-Spiritusfabriek & NV

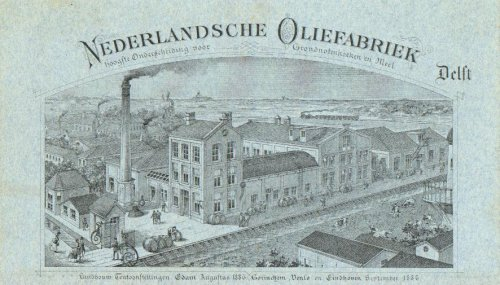
NV Nederlandsche Oliefabriek, advertising stickers of 1886

In 1873, Agneta Matthes founded her own business, the Delft perfume factory, Maison Neuve, where her husband acted pro forma as owner because of the legal issues. The factory used the ethanol by-product of the yeast production of Gist & Spiritusfabriek.

Agneta concentrated on the perfume factory in the following years, and collaborated with the Delft porcelain manufacturer De Koninklijke Porceleyne Fles, which created perfume bottles for her products. She participated in international exhibitions, where her perfume brand, PMN (Parfumerie Maison Neuve), won several prizes and gained recognition for her company. She won the bronze medal of the 1878 on the Paris World's Fair. In Australia, her perfumes won first prize at the international perfume fair. She sold the company in 1886 with profit. In 2022, the trademark rights were reclaimed by Agneta’s family, who, under the leadership of Wibo Schepel and Birgitte Catijn Delisle, reintroduced the perfume brand as a niche fragrance in a limited edition. Notably, a year later, Van Marken’s original company, Royal DSM, merged with the Swiss family-owned Firmenich, a leading specialist in perfumes and beauty products, forming dsm-firmenich.

True to Agneta’s pioneering spirit, Maison Neuve will be presented at the World Expo in Osaka, Japan, within the Dutch pavilion. Just as in 1880, during the first World Expo in the Asia-Pacific region, the brand will showcase its hand-painted Delft Blue bottles. For this occasion, dsm-firmenich Master Perfumer Wessel-Jan Kos created the fragrance New Dawn—a signature scent that highlights the innovation and creativity of Dutch entrepreneurship.

In 1883, the couple became interested in margarine, a young industry in the Netherlands at the time. With private capital and a legacy from Matthes' mother, they founded the Nederlandsche Oliefabriek NV, and built a factory next to the yeast factory. In 1885, they took over Delftse Lijm & Gelatinefabriek NV. Jacques van Marken officially acted as sole manager. To operate a purchasing co-operative in Agnetapark, they founded the Co-operative Winkelvereeniging in 1873. In 1892 they also founded a printing company, which now is owned by the Koninklijke Drukkerij GJ Thieme. In all these companies, Matthes was instrumental in decision making, planning and organisation. The couple pursued the same personnel policy as in the Gist & Spiritusfabriek. In 1878, they established the first works council of the Netherlands, called, "de Kern" (the kernel). At the height of their success in 1885, when they employed approximately 1,250 employees, their companies were collectively known as, the Delftsche Nijverheid (Delft Industry).

== Factory journal ==
On 24 June 1882, the first issue of an internal newspaper of the factory, called, Fabrieksbode ("messenger of the factory"), was published. It was the first magazine of that kind in the world. Agneta helped her husband with other publications, such as his 1881 book, La question ouvrière à la fabrique néerlandaise de levure et d'alcool. Essai de solution pratique (The Labour Problem in the Dutch Yeast and Alcohol Factory. Attempt at a Practical Solution), and another in 1894, L'Organisation Sociale dans l'industrie (The Social System in the Industry), which was printed in two editions and translated into English and German. The full extent of Matthes' participation is not known, but she was certainly in charge of the translations.

== Social welfare ==
=== Agnetapark ===
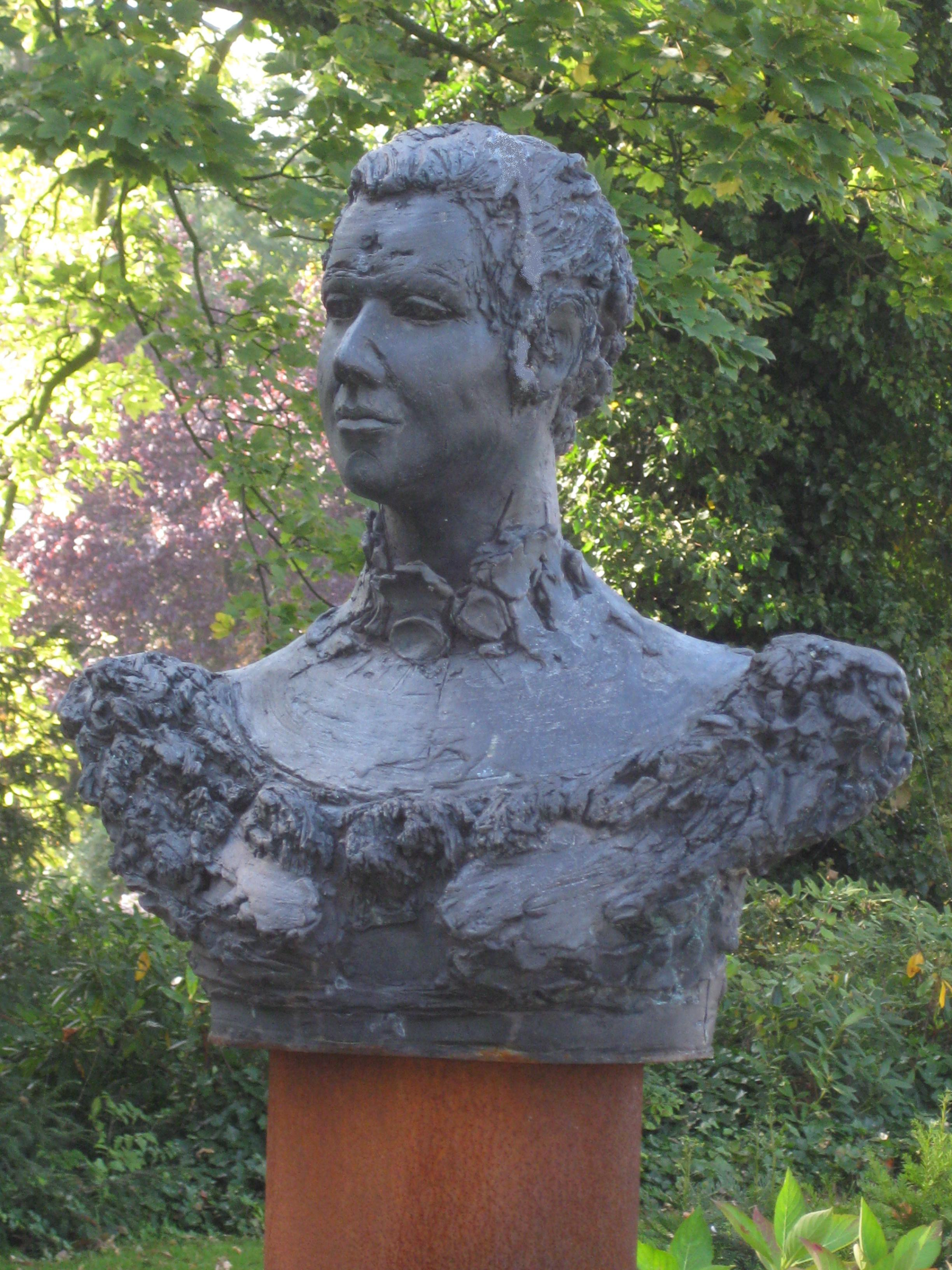
Bust of Matthes in the Agnetapark in Delft

In 1881 the couple began work on a housing quarter for their workers that followed the principles of the garden city movement. With financial support from Matthes' mother, they purchased a 4 hectares (9.9 acres) plot of land for 16,000 guilders. in Hof van Delft, then a rural, sparsely populated village well outside the Delft city limits. From 1882 to 1884, the area was developed in the style of an English landscape garden, crisscrossed by streams, after the plans of landscape architect, Louis Paul Zocher, son of Jan David Zocher. Eugene Cowl, an architect, designed 48 row houses, other buildings, and a villa for Matthes and van Marken. The facility was named Agnetapark, after its founder. The residential park featured individual multi-story apartments with private entrances, private bathrooms, and private garden areas. Matthes and van Marken established a corporation for the development of the settlement, and gave the park to its workers in 1870 as a co-operative, in order to prevent speculation.

To the great astonishment of the founders, the employees were not so happy as expected. The area was remote from urban infrastructure and lacked good transportation facilities. These disadvantages were offset by an improvement of community facilities in three buildings: De Gemeenschap (the community), a large house with a kindergarten and an elementary school, which served as a gathering place and a dining room. Other features included a gymnasium, a billiards club, de Tent (the tent) – a music and event pavilion, and a grocery store, which later also sold clothes. The park had a playground, a bowling alley, a shooting range, and a boathouse with rowing boats for hire. A volunteer fire department, a brass band, and clubs for shooting, bowling, and cycling also were founded.

The employees, however, did not like living so close to their employers. They complained about the distance to the city and the transportation problems, and they criticised the rental rates and the reserves they had to make. After the deaths of Matthes and van Marken, however, the park gradually evolved into a desirable residential area. In 1931 the villa, Rust Roest, which had long been empty, was converted into a school. It was demolished in 1981. Since 1989, the park has been listed as Cultural heritage.

=== Corporate citizenship ===
In 1871, van Marken was appointed secretary of the Vereeniging van het Volksonderwijs bevordering dead (Association for the Advancement of Public Education), after which time Agneta Matthes regularly visited charity schools and was involved in the improvement of their situation.

During the winter of 1879–1880, extended periods of extreme cold affected the Netherlands. Permafrost and temperatures down to minus 16 degrees Celsius led to distress among the citizens of Delft. In response, Matthes founded the Vereeniging voor Armenzorg (Association to care for the poor), helping regardless of religious or political beliefs. She prompted her husband to launch a Wintersnood-Commissie, which was led by him, his brother-in-law Arnold Kerdijk, and CEO-to-be Gerard Knuttel.

In 1880, the couple founded a health insurance scheme for bakers. This insurance was also the first step toward more regulated pensions. Insurance in case of accidents at work was established in 1884.

== Criticism ==
Van Marken was regarded as a "social entrepreneur" and a pioneer of his time regarding social issues, however, he was criticised for acting for his workers instead of letting them participate. Although she was not explicitly mentioned, Matthes also drew criticism. In 1906, the journalist Frank van der Goes published van Marken's obituary in Het Volk, the organ of the Social Democratic labour movement. Two critical articles were entitled, "Een levensleugen" (A Delusion of a Life) and imputed ulterior motives of van Marken's undoubted social engagements. Van der Goes wrote that by providing care to his workers, van Marken had bribed their loyalty and wanted to exercise social control, while his staff was unduly dependent on him; for example, they found difficulty changing jobs once they had moved into a house in Agnetapark.

Despite the disappointments regarding Agnetapark, it was an important model for the co-operative development and construction of garden cities for workers. The park is considered the first social housing scheme which cared about providing hygienic living conditions in a green environment for a high quality of life.
