= Beijers park =

Public park in Malmö, Sweden

Coordinates: 55.610404°N 13.050018°E

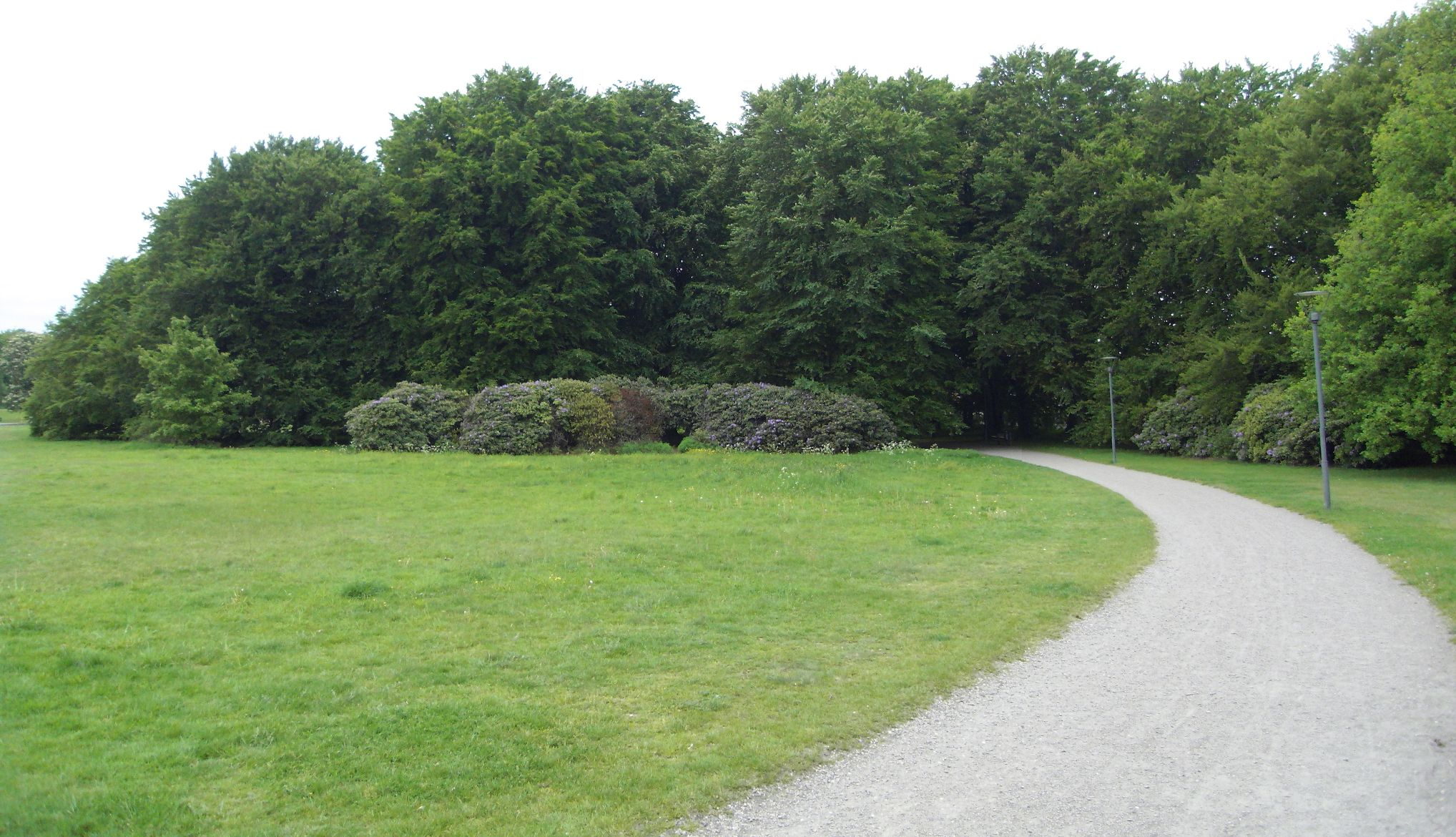
Part of the park in 2013

Beijers park is a public park in the city of Malmö, Sweden. Construction of the park began in 1885, and it opened to the public in 1914.

In the 1800s, public parks began to be established in Sweden. In 1881, an association was founded in Malmö called the Malmö beautification and planting of association (Malmö Förskönings- och planteringsförening). One of the founders, Gottfried Beijer, applied with his brother to lease a piece of land and began construction of Beijers park in 1885. The city took over the park in 1901 and it opened to the public in 1914.
