= Inez Beijer =

Dutch cyclist

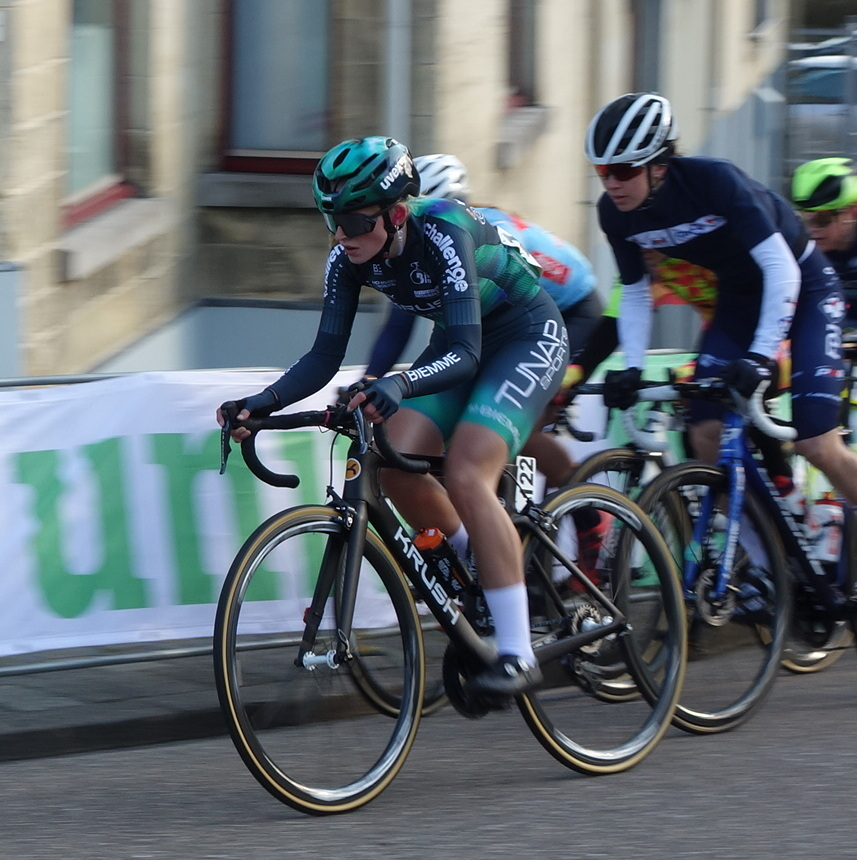
- Beijer at the 2021 Amstel Gold Race

Personal information
- Born: 22 November 1995 (age 30)

Cycling career
- Sport: Cycling
- Discipline: Road
- Role: Rider

Amateur teams
- 2017–2018: Adelaar Ladies CT
- 2019: Swabo Women Development Team

Professional team
- 2020–2021: Biehler Krush Pro Cycling

Inez Beijer (born 22 November 1995) is a Dutch professional racing cyclist, who rode for UCI Women's Continental Team GT Krush Tunap.
