= Agneta Willeken =

Agneta Willeken (c. 1497-1562) was the lover of the German mercenary Marcus Meyer, one of the most notable participators of the Count's Feud. She was pointed out as a political participator on the side of Lübeck in the propaganda of the war.

She was the daughter of the merchant Peter Radkens of Hamburg and married the merchant Hans Willeken. Her spouse became ruined in 1527, and moved to Lübeck, where he died in 1535. She stayed in Hamburg and became the lover of Marcus Meyer, with whom she corresponded when he left to Lübeck and married a wealthy widow. When he participate in the war he gave captured goods to her. During Meyer's siege of Varberg Fortress in 1535, she sent him a letter, which was taken by the King of Denmark and used as propaganda material. This letter was used to point out Willeken as a major instigator and political participator of the war. She was pointed out as the main force behind the decision of the Lübeck mayor, Jürgen Wullenwever, to declare war on Holstein.

== Sources ==
- Heinrich Reincke: Agneta Willeken. Ein Lebensbild aus Wullenwevers Tagen, Pfingstblätter des Hansischen Geschichtsvereins 1928
- Edith Ennen: Frauen im Mittelalter, C.H.Beck, 1999; S. 154–156
