= Agnetapark =

Area of workers' housing in South Holland

Coordinates: 52°00′58″N 4°20′45″E

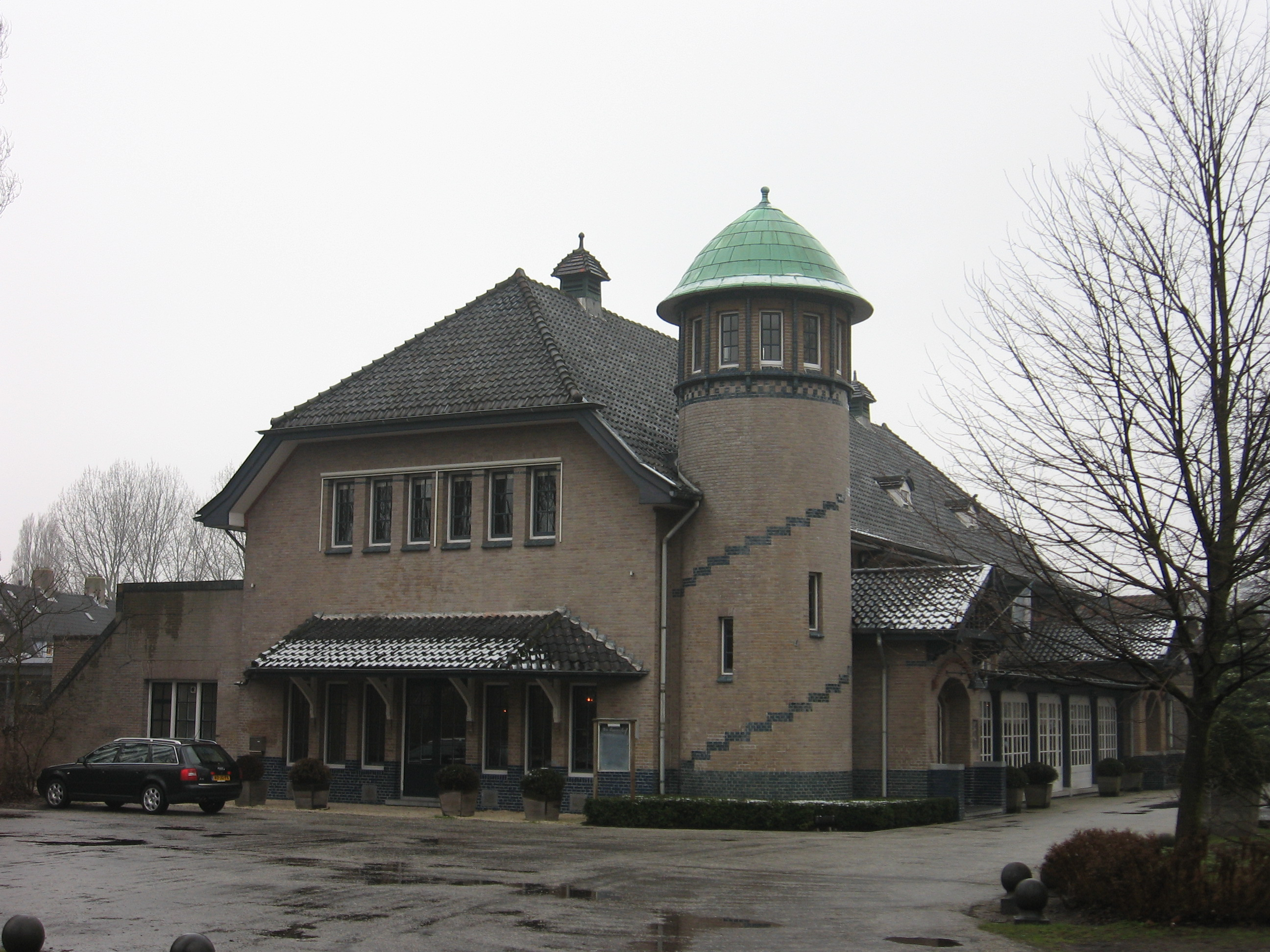
Lindenhof in Agnetapark

Agnetapark was an area of workers' housing in Delft, South Holland, the Netherlands. It was one of the highest quality workers' housing areas built before the Housing Act of 1902 was imposed. It was 'transformed' from a marshy 4 hectares (9.9 acres) area of land to a 'paradise' of industry. It is named after Agneta Matthes as she helped transform it.

== History ==
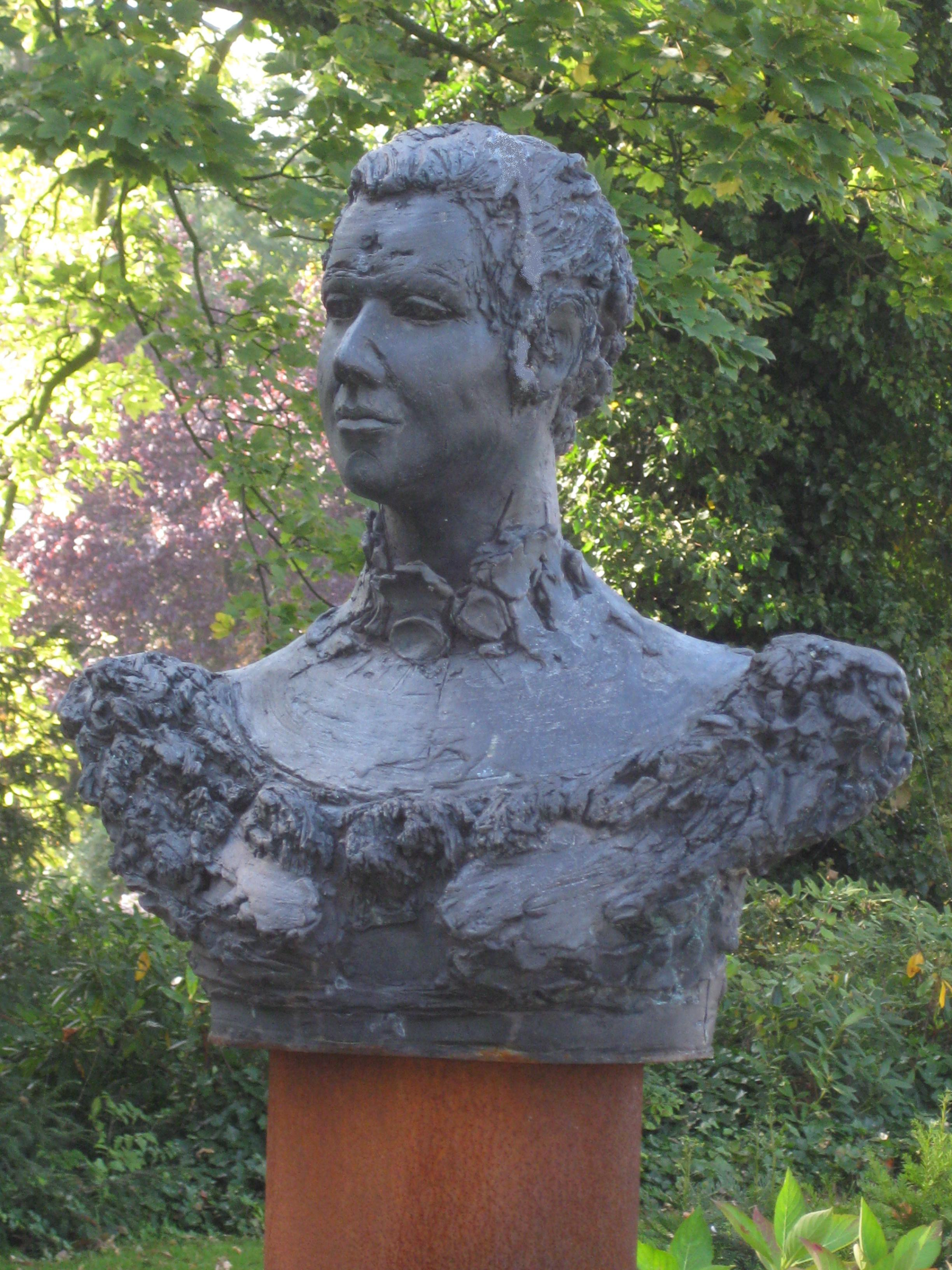
Bust in the park of its namesake Agneta Matthes

In 1881 the 4-hectare (9.9-acre) plot of land was purchased by Agneta Matthes and Jacob Cornelis van Marken at the price of 16,000 guilders. It was built after the plans of the architect Louis Paul Zocher, who designed an English Landscape garden—scale park. 48 terraced houses, semi-detached houses and community buildings were placed around the park. The area had no urban infrastructure and was a disadvantage. There were three main buildings, De Gemeenschap (the community), a large house which included a kindergarten and an elementary school which included a dining room and a gym, de Tent (the tent), a music and event pavilion where a grocery store and a bakery business where there was late a clothing shop. Finally, the children's playground, which included a bowling alley, a shooting range and a boathouse for the ability to hire rowing boats. There was also a shooting club, a bowling club, a bicycle club and a brass band. After the death of Jacob Cornelis van Marken, the park became a desirable residential area which offered rental homes. Since 1989, the park has been listed. The villa later had one settlement built around it, the Rust Roest (meaning: resting rusts or: use it or lose it). The founders of the Rust Roest formed a corporation to help the development of the settlement and gave the park staff in 1870.
