= Agnete Bræstrup =

Danish physician (1909–1992)

- Born: 7 October 1909; Berlin, German Empire
- Died: 11 July 1992 (aged 82); Copenhagen, Denmark
- Education: Doctor of medicine
- Alma mater: University of Copenhagen
- Known for: Sex education, women's and children's rights activism
- Spouse: Povl Andreas Wimpffen (m. 1936; died 1981)
- Children: 3
- Scientific career
- Fields: Medicine

Agnete Bræstrup (7 October 1909 – 11 July 1992) was a Danish physician. She founded Foreningen for Familieplanlægning (Association for Family Planning) in 1956, which is now known as Sex & Samfund (Sex & Society), a non-profit organization responsible for providing sex education in Denmark.
