= Jan-Åke Jonsson =

Swedish businessman

Jan Åke Jonsson
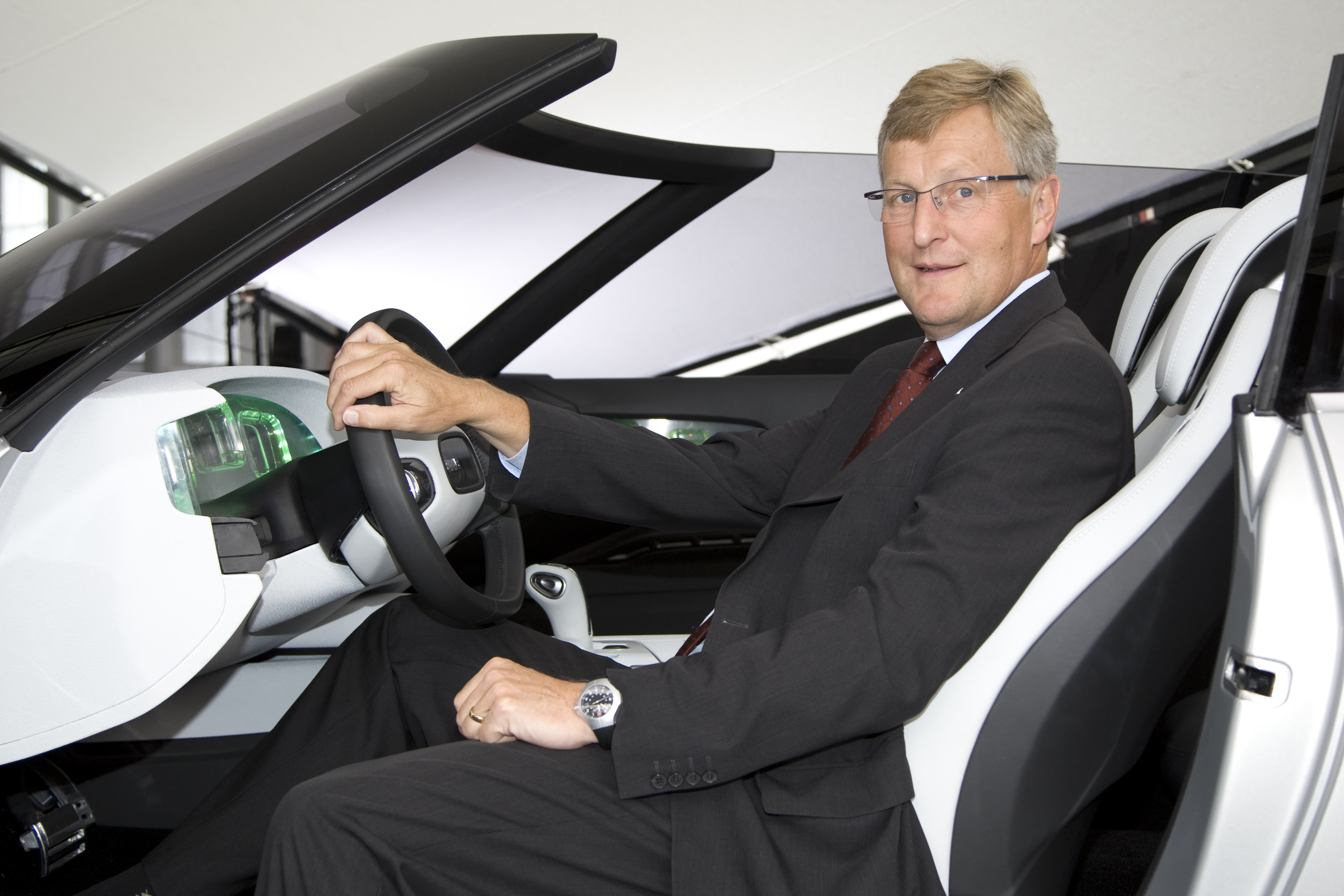
- Born: Jan Åke Jonsson; September 18, 1951 (age 74); Valdemarsvik, Sweden
- Other name: JÅJ
- Education: Uppsala University
- Occupations: Executive; CEO of Saab Automobile (2005-2011)source Chairman of the Board at Polstiernan Industri AB (2012-Present) source
- Predecessor: Peter Augustsson at Saab Automobile
- Successor: Victor Muller at Swedish Automobile

Jan-Åke Jonsson (born September 18, 1951) was the managing director of Saab Automobile AB from April 1, 2005, to March 25, 2011. He currently sits as Chairman of the Board for Polstiernan Industri AB.

== Education ==
Born in Valdemarsvik, Sweden, Jonsson received a bachelor's degree in Business Administration from Uppsala University and first joined Saab-Scania's Automobile Division in Nyköping in 1973.

== Career ==
He held a variety of positions in Systems Development until becoming a Director for Aftersales & Services of Saab in Trollhättan in 1990. Jonsson held a variety of senior managerial position with Saab, including two years as vice president for Sales and Marketing for Saab USA, in Atlanta, GA (1991-1993), until he replaced Peter Augustsson at the helm of Saab Automobile in 2005. In 2010 he Received the Swedish Business Award for Outstanding Achievements of the first magnitude from the West Swedish Chamber of Commerce and Industry for decisive action for the western Swedish industry, regarding the way he led Saab Automobile through a restructuring process and protracted sale negotiations that continued for over a year.

=== Tax crimes allegation ===
The Swedish Tax Agency (Skatteverket) handed in a report to the police in May 2012 about their suspicions that Jonsson and two others had committed serious tax crimes. He was released later on Tuesday, but the criminal suspicions against him remain. He denies committing any crimes.

In April 2017 he was acquitted of these charges.
