= Beijer Electronics =

Swedish industrial automation company

- Company type: Business entity of Ependion AB
- Industry: Industrial automation
- Founded: 1981; 45 years ago in Malmö, Sweden
- Headquarters: Malmö, Sweden
- Key people: Kristine Lindberg (CEO)
- Products: HMI terminals, operator panels, industrial PCs, automation software
- Parent: Ependion AB (formerly Beijer Electronics Group AB)
- Website: beijerelectronics.com

Beijer Electronics is a Swedish industrial automation company that designs and manufactures human–machine interface (HMI) terminals, operator panels, industrial PCs, and automation software. Founded in 1981 in Malmö, it originally operated as a Nordic distributor for Mitsubishi Electric's automation products before developing its own product line in the 1990s. Beijer Electronics is a business entity of Ependion AB (formerly Beijer Electronics Group AB), which is listed on the Nasdaq Stockholm Mid Cap list.

== History ==
=== Early years and Mitsubishi partnership (1981–2000) ===
Beijer Electronics was established in 1981 in Malmö to distribute Mitsubishi Electric's programmable logic controller (PLC) products in the Nordic market, at a time when PLC technology was beginning to replace older relay-based control systems in manufacturing. In the late 1980s, the company began developing its own proprietary operator panels, introducing the first MAC series of HMI terminals in 1990. The MAC series established Beijer Electronics, as a manufacturer rather than solely a distributor, and the company achieved international success with these products.

=== Stock listing and acquisitions (2000–2015) ===
In 2000, Beijer Electronics was listed on the Stockholm Stock Exchange after being spun off from its former parent company, G & L Beijer AB. The listing initiated a period of acquisition-driven growth. In 2007, Beijer Electronics acquired Westermo, a Swedish manufacturer of industrial Ethernet and data communication equipment, which became a separate business area (Industrial Data Communication) within the group from January 2008. In 2010, the company acquired QSI Corporation in the United States to strengthen its North American HMI presence, and took a minority stake in Taiwanese data communication firm Korenix Technology, completing the full acquisition in 2011 for approximately 130 million SEK.

After more than 30 years of close partnership, Beijer Electronics and Mitsubishi Electric ended their distribution relationship in 2015, as their strategies had significantly diverged.

=== Reorganisation and Ependion rebrand (2015–present) ===
In 2017, a new group structure was introduced with the parent company renamed Beijer Electronics Group AB, and the operating businesses reorganised into two business entities: Beijer Electronics (Industrial Automation Solutions) and Westermo (Industrial Data Communication). The group continued acquiring companies through its Westermo entity, including Swiss firm Neratec and Irish company Virtual Access in 2019, and German company ELTEC Elektronik AG (specialising in wireless communication for connected trains) in 2021.

In 2023, the parent company was renamed Ependion AB to reflect the two-business structure, with Beijer Electronics continuing to operate under its own name as the automation-focused entity. In the same period, Kristine Lindberg was appointed CEO of the Beijer Electronics business entity.

== Products ==
Beijer Electronics' core products are HMI operator panels and industrial PCs for use in manufacturing, marine, and rugged-environment applications. Key product lines include the X2 series (launched 2016), designed for IoT connectivity, and the iX HMI software platform (introduced 2010), which provides SCADA connectivity and a graphical design environment. The company also offers WebIQ, an HTML5-based HMI/SCADA platform acquired through Smart HMI.

== Markets ==
Beijer Electronics serves customers across a range of industrial segments, with general manufacturing as its largest market. Other key sectors include marine and offshore, oil and gas, water and wastewater, and building automation. The company operates through proprietary offices in Europe, Asia, and the Americas, supplemented by a network of value-added distributors worldwide.

== See also ==
- Westermo
- Ependion
