= LEAF Award =

Annual architectural prize

The ABB LEAF Awards is an annual international architectural prize. It recognises innovative architectural design that sets the benchmark for the international architectural community of the next generation.

The LEAF Awards program is operated by the Leading European Architects Forum (LEAF), founded in 2001. LEAF brings together leading international architects and designers operating in Europe and beyond to share knowledge, to network and to develop new partnerships.

Entry is open to all architects worldwide and buildings located anywhere in the world and completed between January 2010 and May 2011 are eligible for LEAF Awards 2011.

It’s been hosted on five occasions by the BBC presenter Rick Kelsey.

== Categories ==
LEAF Awards 2015 will consist of the following thirteen categories and the Overall Winner:

- Mixed – Use Building of the year
- Residential Building of the year - Single and Multiple Occupancy
- International Interior Design Award
- Commercial Building of the year
- Hospitality Building of the Year
- Refurbishment of the year
- Public Building of the year
- Best Sustainable Development
- Best Future Building
- Urban Design
- Best Façade Design & Engineering
- Developer of the Year
- Lifetime Achievement of the Year

LEAF Awards 2011 consisted of the following twelve categories and the Overall Winner:

- Residential Building of the Year (single occupancy)
- Residential Building of the Year (multiple occupancy)
- Commercial Building of the Year
- Public Building of the Year
- Mixed-Use Building of the Year
- International Residential Interior Design Award
- International Commercial/Public Interior Design Award
- International Offsite Construction Project of the Year
- Best Structural Design of the Year
- Young Architect of the Year
- Best Sustainable Technology Incorporated into a Building
- Best Sustainable Development in keeping with its Environment

== Venues ==
The location of the award ceremony changes from year to year.

- 2006: 3rd annual LEAF Awards, Marriott Hotel in Dubai
- 2007: 4th annual LEAF Awards, Hilton Cavalieri in Rome
- 2008: 5th annual LEAF Awards, Dorchester Hotel London (host: Laurence Llewelyn-Bowen)
- 2009: 6th annual LEAF Awards, Ritz-Carlton Hotel, Berlin
- 2010: 7th annual LEAF Awards, InterContinental London Park Lane, London on 10 September 2010
- 2011: 8th annual LEAF Awards, Landmark Hotel London on 16 September 2011
- 2014: LEAF Awards, Swissotel Düsseldorf on 10 October 2014
- 2015: LEAF Awards, London

== Overall winners ==
Year	Laureate	Building	Location
2019	Mozhao Architects; China	Zishe·Planting Pavilion and Planting Terrace	Shenzhen, China
2014	Ateliers Jean Nouvel and PTW Architects; France Australia	One Central Park	Sydney, Australia
2013	archi5 France	Mediatheque	Mont-de-Marsan, France
2012	Sou Fujimoto Architects; Japan	Musashino Art University Museum & Library	Tokyo, Japan
2011	OBR Open Building Research; Italy	Milanofiori housing complex [https://www.obr.eu/project/milanofiori-residential-complex/]	Milan, Italy
2010	Boogertman + Partners & Populous; South Africa	Soccer City National Stadium	Johannesburg, South Africa
2009	Woods Bagot; Australia	Qatar Science & Technology Park	Doha, Qatar
2008	schmidt hammer lassen Denmark	Performers House	Silkeborg, Denmark
2007	Skidmore, Owings and Merrill; United States	ARB Bank	Riyadh, Saudi Arabia
2006	David Chipperfield; United Kingdom	America's Cup Building	Valencia; Spain
2005	Henning Larsen Architects; Denmark	IT University of Copenhagen	Copenhagen, Denmark

== Category winners ==
=== 2019 ===
The category winners in 2019 were:

- Lifetime Achievement Award: Diller Scofidio + Renfro
- Best Arts and Culture Building Project: OPEN Architecture, ‘UCCA Dune Art Museum’, Qinhuangdao, China
- Best New Start Up Practice Project: Nathanael Dorent and Lily Jencks, ‘Ruins Studio’, Dumfries, Scotland, UK
- Best Tall Building Project: Zaha Hadid Architects, ‘Nanjing International Youth Cultural Centre’, Nanjing, China
- Best Regenerative Impact Project: Marcy Wong Donn Logan Architects, ‘Ford Point Revitalization’, Richmond, California US
- Best Mixed Use Building Project: West-line Studio, ‘Up to the Mountain and Down to the River’, Fuxing Town, China
- Best Residential Building Project – Single Occupancy – Sponsored by Laufen: Fujiwara Muro Architects, ‘House in Toyonaka’, Osaka, Japan
- Best Residential Building Project – Multiple Occupancy – Sponsored by Laufen: Skidmore, Owings & Merrill, ‘Manhattan Loft Gardens (The Stratford)’, London, UK
- Best Interior Design Project: Design Studio MAOOM, ‘Coffee Nap Roasters 2nd’, Seoul, Korea
- Best Commercial Building Project: TCHOBAN VOSS Architects, ‘Große Bleichen 19’, Hamburg, Germany
- Best Hospitality Building Project: STUDIO QI, ‘Annso Hill’, Tengchong, China
- Best Refurbishment Project: Marcy Wong Donn Logan Architects, ‘Uber Advanced Technologies Group R&D Center’, San Francisco, California US
- Best Public Building Project: Andrew Bromberg at Aedas, ‘Hong Kong West Kowloon Station’, Hong Kong
- Best Achievement in Environmental Performance Project: LUO studio, ‘Longfu Life Experience Centre’, Puyang County, China
- Best Future Building Under Construction Project: ODA New York, ‘Postkantoor’, Rotterdam, The Netherlands
- Best Urban Design Project: MOZHAO ARCHITECTS, ‘Zishe·Planting Pavilion and Planting Terrace’, Shenzhen, China
- Best Façade Design and Engineering Project – Sponsored by Inox-Color: Marcy Wong Donn Logan Architects, ‘Center Street Parking Garage’, Berkeley, California US

=== 2015 ===
The category winners in 2015 were:

- Residential Building of the Year – Single Occupancy: Architect Robby Cantarutti/ Project: Riverside Cabin
- Mixed – Use Building of the Year: Kavellaris Urban Design KUD/ Project: 2 girls Building
- Residential Building of the Year – Multiple Occupancy: Studio MK27/ Project: V_Itaim
- International Interior Design Award of the Year: Innocad/ Project: HQ ÖBB
- Commercial Building of the Year: LAN Architecture/ Project: Euravenir Tower
- Hospitality Building of the Year: Hiroshi Nakamura & NAP co. Ltd/ Project: Ribbon Chapel
- Refurbishment of the Year: Nikken Space Design LTD/ Project: ANA Crowne Plaza Hotel, Hiroshima Chapel
- Public Building of the Year: Tabanlioglu Architects Melkan Gursel & Murat Tabanlioglu/ Project: Dakar Congress Center Steven Holl Architects with JMArchitects Project: Seona Reid Building – Glasgow School of Art
- Best Sustainable Development of the Year: Kaunitz Yeung Architecture/ Project: Wanarn Clinic Henning Larsen Architects, Campus Kolding, SDU, University of Southern Denmark
- Best Future Building of the Year – Drawing Board: Sanjay Puri Architects/ Project: Reservoir 3TI Progetti Spa – 3TI LAB Srl/ Project: Civic Centre
- Best Future Building of the Year – Under Construction: Andrew Bromberg of Aedas/ Project: The West Kowloon Terminus under the Hong Kong Section of the Express Rail Link/ project
- Urban Design of the Year: Henning Larsen Architects and Tredje Natur/ Project: Vinge Train Station
- Best Façade Design and Engineering of the Year: Logon Architecture/ Project: Shanghai Museum of Glass
- Developer of the Year: Battersea Power Station/ Project: Battersea Power Station
- Lifetime Achievement Winner: Moshe Safdie
- Overall Winner: Hiroshi Nakamura & NAP Co. Ltd/ Project: Ribbon Chapel

=== 2011 ===
The category winners in 2011 were:

- Mixed Use Building: Todd Architects for The Boat
- Residential Building (Multiple Occupancy): OBR Open Building Research S.r.l. for Milanofiori Residential Complex
- Residential Building (Single Occupancy): Studio mk27 for Punta House
- Commercial Building: Estudi Massip-Bosch Architects for Diagonal ZeroZero Telefonica Tower
- Public Building: Joint winners: Diaz & Diaz Arquitectos for Building of Control CCS and Steven Holl Architects for Cité de l'Océan et du Surf
- International Interior Design: RHWL Architects for St. Pancras Renaissance London Hotel
- Master Planning & Landscaping: URBE Architects for Estoril Open Space Strategy
- Young Architect: dEMM arquitectura – Paulo Fernandes Silva for Living Foz Porto
- Structural Design: schmidt hammer lassen architects for The Crystal
- Best Sustainable Technology Incorporated into a Building: JSWD Architekten for Q1 Building, ThyssenKrupp Quarter
- Best Sustainable Development in Keeping with its Environment: LAN for EDF Archives Centre
- Overall winner: OBR Open Building Research S.r.l. for Milanofiori Residential Complex

=== 2010 ===
The category winners in 2010 were:

- Mixed Use Building: Feilden Clegg Bradley Studios for Broadcasting Place
- Residential Building (Multiple Occupancy): Henning Larsen Architects for The Wave
- Residential Building (Single Occupancy): Mount Fuji Architects Studio for PLUS
- Commercial Building: Hassel and Lend Lease design for ANZ Centre, Melbourne
- Public Building: Boogertman + Partners & Populous for Soccer City National Stadium
- International Interior Design: Isay Weinfeld Arquitetura for Bar Número
- Master Planning & Landscaping: URBE Architects for Estoril Open Space Strategy
- Young Architect: Arquitecturia for Ferreries Cultural Centre
- Structural Design: Skidmore, Owings and Merrill for Burj Khalifa
- Sustainable Development: Ben Nakamura for Nanasawa Kibonooka Elementary School

=== 2009 ===
The category winners in 2009 were:

- Mixed-Use Building: EAA-Emre Arolat Architects for 7800 Çe?me Residences & Hotel
- Residential Building: David Chipperfield Architects for Ninetree Village
- Residential Building: Studio mk27 for Paraty House
- Commercial Building: Woods Bagot for Qatar Science & Technology Park
- Public Building: GPY arquitectos for La Cisnera Community Centre
- International Interior Design: Atelier Brückner GmbH for BMW Museum
- Master Planning & Landscaping: Strootman Landscape Architects & Palmbout Urban Landscapes for Wieringen Passage
- Young Architect: John Pardey Architects for Hind House
- Best Sustainable Development: Chetwoods Architects for Blue Planet, Chatterley Valley
- Structural Design: Amanda Levete Architects for Spencer Dock Bridge
- Grand Prix Winner Winner: Woods Bagot for Qatar Science & Technology Park

=== 2008 ===
Category winners in 2008 were:

- Mixed-Use Building of the Year: schmidt hammer lassen for Performers House
- Residential Building (single storey): bgp arquitectura for Black House
- Residential Building (multi storey): PCKO Architects for eScape
- Commercial Building (public): Kengo Kuma & Associates for Suntory Museum of Art
- Commercial Building (business): John McAslan & Partners for 28 Dorset Square
- International Interior Design: Skidmore, Owings and Merrill for GSC Offices
- Young Architect: Xavier Vilalta for Arreletes Day-Care Centre
- Sustainable Development: LSI Architects LLP for Cley Marshes Visitor Centre
- New Innovation: WSP Architectural Design Consulting for Long Shan Church
- Best Structural Design: Foster and Partners for Beijing International Airport Terminal
- Grand Prix: schmidt hammer lassen for Performers House

=== 2007 ===
The category winners in 2007 were:

- Environmentally Sustainable Building: Design Engine Architects for British Embassy, Sana'a
- International Interior Design: Woods Bagot for First Lounge
- New Build (built): Steven Holl Architects for Nelson-Atkins Museum of Art
- New Build (in design): Skidmore, Owings and Merrill for ARB Bank
- Structural Design: Arup Associates for Kensington Oval
- Public Building: Haworth Tompkins for Young Vic
- Public Building (in design): PTW Architects for Beijing National Aquatics Center
- Material Supplier to the Architectural Industry: EH Smith for Sir John Lyon House
- Young Architect: Estudio Barozzi Veiga SL for Ribera del Duero Wine HQ
- International Building: Ryuichi Ashizawa Architects and Associates for Setre Chapel
- Overall Winner: Skidmore, Owings and Merrill for ARB Bank

=== 2006 ===
The category winners in 2006 were:

- New Build: 3XN Architects for Muziekgebouw
- Environmentally Sustainable Project: Farrells for The Green Building
- Public Building: Raymond Moriyama and Griffiths Rankin Cook Architects for Canadian War Museum
- Regeneration Project: David Chipperfield for Des Moines Public Library
- Structural Design: Zaha Hadid Architects for Phaeno Science Center
- Use of Innovative Technology and Thoughtful Design (Small Scheme): Litracon Light Transmitting Concrete
- Use of Technology (Large Scheme): Bahrain World Trade Centre
- International Interior Design: Stephonson Bell's for AstraZeneca
- Overall Winner: David Chipperfield for America's Cup Building

=== 2005 ===
The category winners in 2005 were:

- New Build: Henning Larsen Architects for IT University of Copenhagen
- Environmentally Sustainable Project: Auer+Weber+Assoziierte for SolarCity Centre
- Public Building: Farrells for Home Office Headquarters
- Regeneration Project: Tillner & Partner Zt GmbH for Vienna Gürtel
- Structural Design: BRT Architekten for Dockland Office Building
- Use of Innovative Technology and Thoughtful Design (Small Scheme): BEHF Architects for Fabios Restaurant Façade
- Use of Technology (large Scheme): Alsop for Queen Mary College, Institute of Cell and Molecular Science
- International Renovation/Interior Design: Aviaplan for IT Fornebu
- Most Promising Technology for the Architectural Industry: Rieder Smart Elements GmbH for Central Park: Urban Elements
- Overall Winner: Henning Larsen Architects for IT University of Copenhagen

== See also ==
- List of architecture prizes
