= The Wave (Vejle) =

Coordinates: 55.709392°N 9.556346°E

The Wave in Vejle
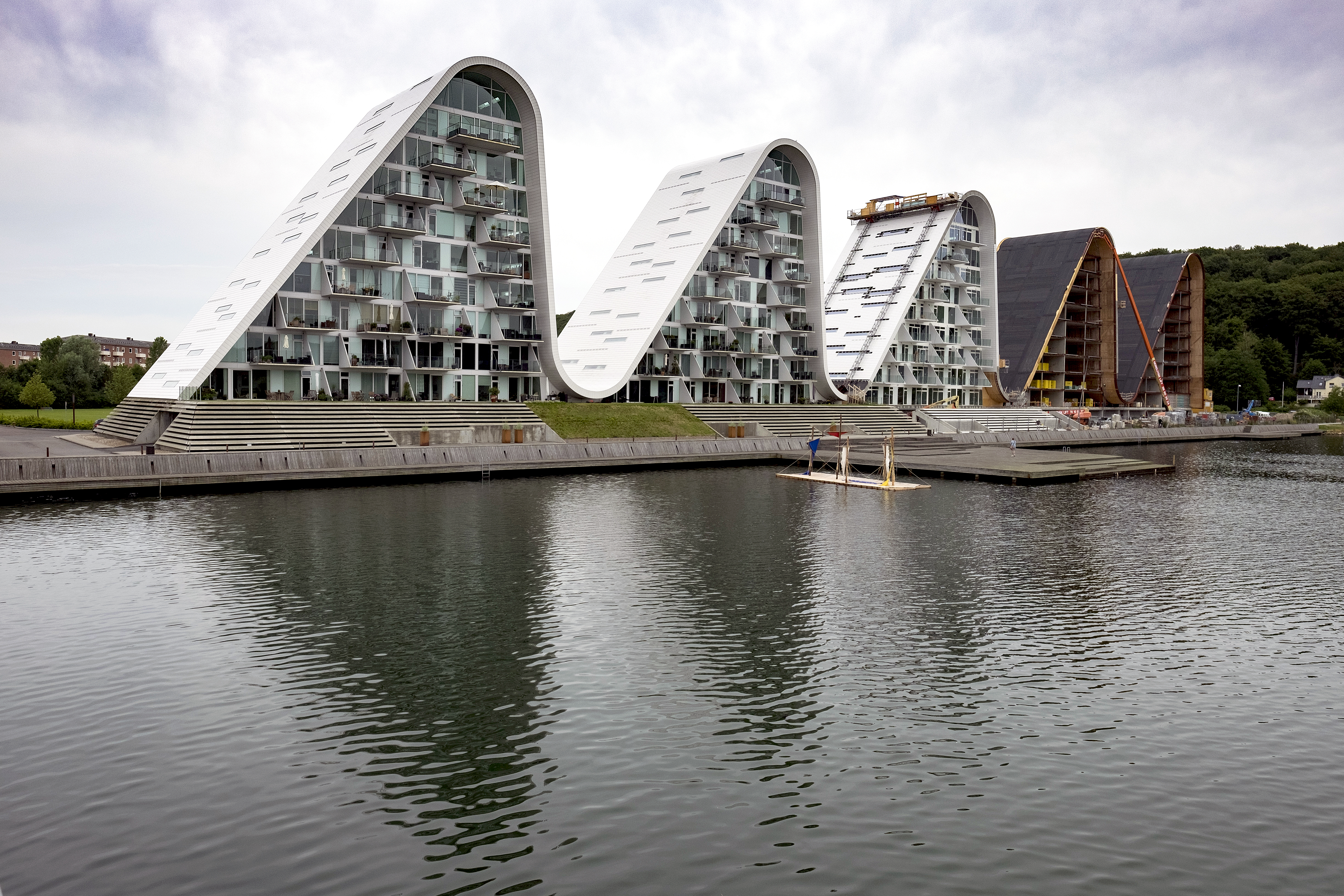
- The Wave in Vejle, Denmark
- Interactive map of the The Wave in Vejle area
- Alternative names: Bølgen "The Wave"

General information
- Type: Residential
- Location: Ved Bølgen, 7100 Vejle, Denmark, Vejle, Denmark

Design and construction
- Architect: Henning Larsen Architects
- Awards: 2010 LEAF Award, 2011 Civic Trust Award

Bølgen (Danish "The Wave") is a modern residential building complex by the Skyttehus bay in Vejle, Denmark. It is inspired by the Sydney Opera House by Danish architect Jørn Utzon and the hilly landscape around Vejle Fjord.

The Wave in Vejle is designed by Henning Larsen Architects and contains ultimately 105 luxury apartments distributed on 14,000 square metres (150,000 sq ft).

It has been named as a ground-breaking architecture piece in modern times and a significant landmark of Vejle.

The two first waves were finished in 2009. Construction was halted for a few years due to financial issues. In 2018, the remaining three waves were completed.

== Awards ==
In 2010 The Wave in Vejle and Henning Larsen Architects won the prestigious architectural prize LEAF Awards in the "multiple occupancy" category. The project also won the annual Vejle Award as 2010 Building of the Year. In 2011 the project won at Civic Trust Awards, that was initiated in 1959 in England to honor the best in architecture, design and planning etc.
