= Vilalta =

Vilalta is a Catalan surname. Notable people with the surname include:

- Maruxa Vilalta (1932–2014), Catalan-Mexican playwright and theater director
- Xavier Vilalta (born 1980), Spanish architect and professor
