= Performers House =

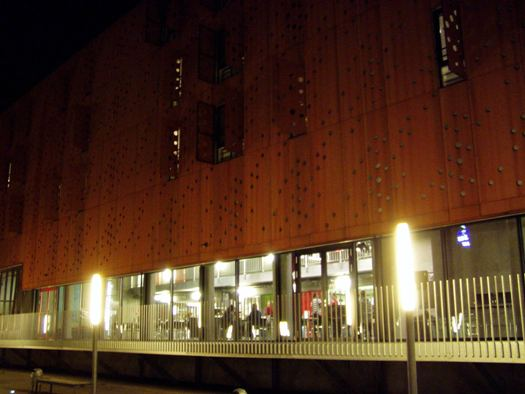

Location
- Silkeborg; Denmark
- Coordinates: 56.1712°N 9.5562°E

Information
- Type: Folk high school
- Founded: 2007
- Director: Allan Kjær Andersen
- Website: Official web site

Performers House was a folk high school in Silkeborg, Denmark, specializing in offering programs for young people with a special interest in music, dance and theatre.

Performers House was situated at the revitalized industrial site of an old paper mill in central Silkeborg. Facilities include spacious performance areas, teaching rooms, a canteen, student café, student accommodation and housing for teaching staff. It is also a high school that offers programs for young people with a special interest in music, dance and theatre.

== Building ==
The school was housed in the former buildings of a paper mill (Silkeborg Papirfabrik), rebuilt and extended in 2007 to the design of Danish architects schmidt hammer lassen.

The old Boiler Building has been redeveloped as a winter garden, teaching room and performance area, while an adjacent plaza links the historic building with its modern counterpart.

The building is kept in a simple architectural style with a corten-steel cladding and visible installations, commemorating the industrial heritage of the site.

The building is integrated in the surrounding urban environment in several ways. The façade is versatile, window shutters on the main stage fold back and can slide to one side, while large glass sections can be opened up, affording passers-by a chance to hear fragments of music or catch a glimpse of theatrical performances. At ground level, the building is equally flexible, the border between interior and exterior and between the individual elements in the academy organism, are continually being redrawn. On the ground floor, internal folding walls and red curtains can be opened and closed, provide endless potential for varying learning environments.

== Programs ==
Performers House had short and long programs as well as brief summer classes. It is now closed.
