= Piironen =

Piironen is a Finnish surname. Notable people with it include:

- Jukka Piironen (1925–1976), pole vaulter
- Paavo Piironen (1943–1974), film and television actor and director

== Similar names ==
- Piiroinen
- Piirainen

== See also ==
- 3759 Piironen, a minor planet
