= Schmidt Hammer Lassen =

Danish architectural firm

Schmidt Hammer Lassen (SHL)
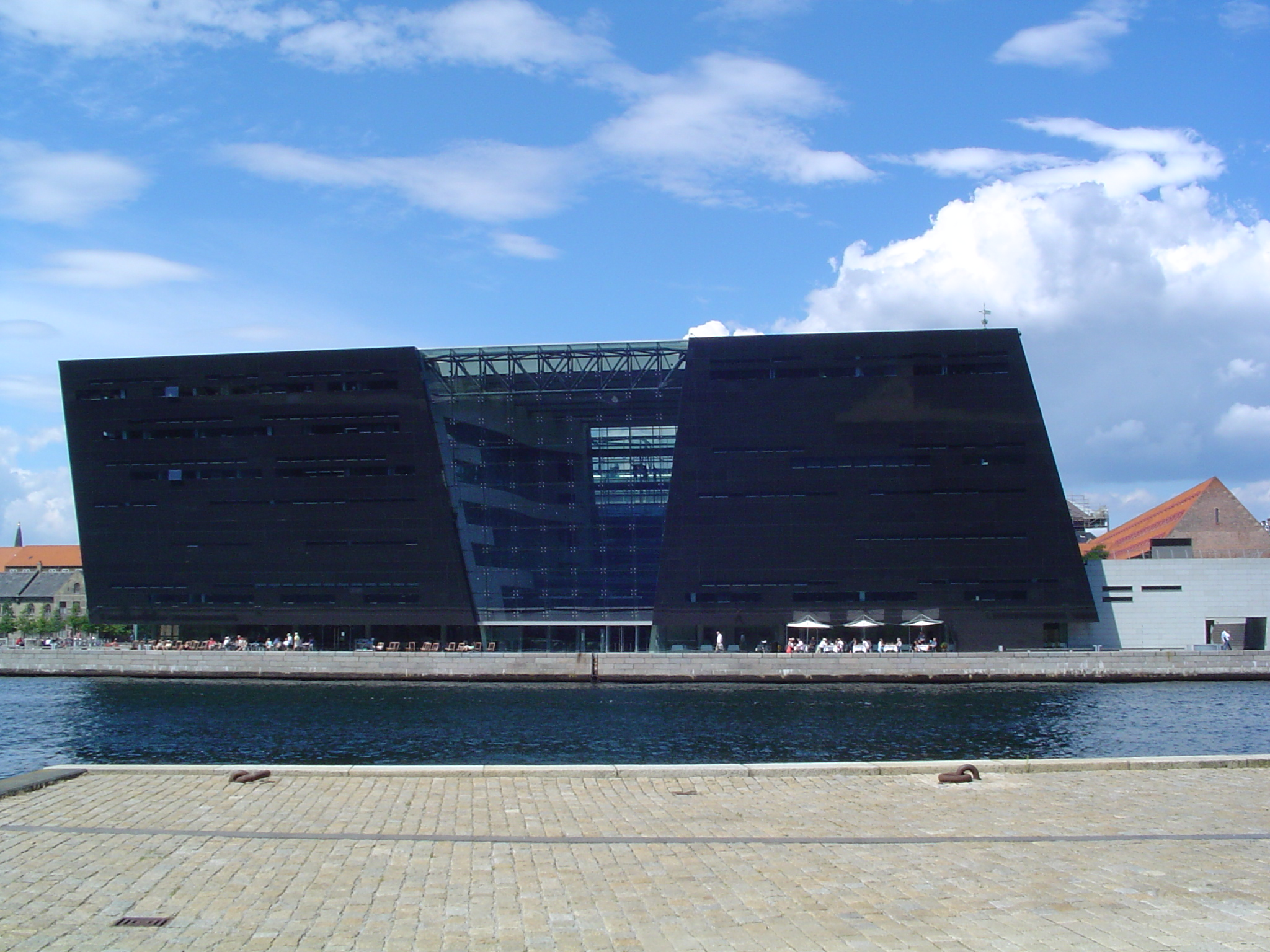
- Danish Royal Library, Copenhagen

Practice information
- Partners: Kristian Ahlmark; Chris Hardie; Elif Tinaztepe; Kasper Frandsen; Mads Kaltoft; René Nedergaard; Sanne Wall-Gremstrup
- Founded: 1986
- Location: Copenhagen, Denmark; Aarhus, Denmark; Shanghai, China

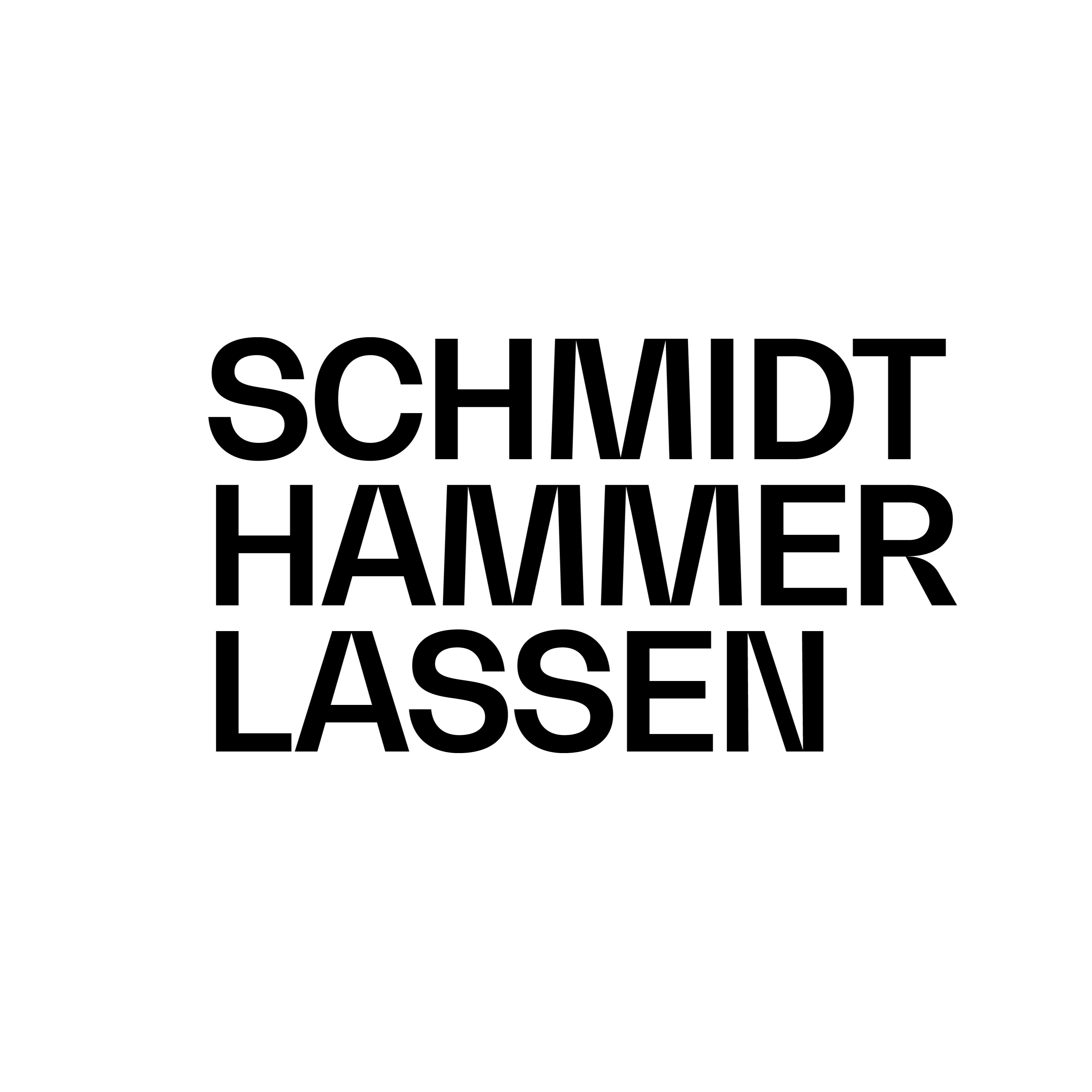

Schmidt Hammer Lassen (SHL) is an international architectural firm founded by a group of Danish architects in 1986 in Aarhus, Denmark. It has offices in Copenhagen and Aarhus in Denmark, and Shanghai, China. In 2018, SHL became part of global architecture and design firm Perkins and Will.

Notable projects include the national library of Denmark The Royal Library (Det Kgl. Bibliotek) in Copenhagen, the ARoS Kunstmuseum in Aarhus, DOKK1, the largest public library in Scandinavia and named by IFLA International Federation of Library Associations as Public Library of the Year in 2016, and Shanghai Library East, one of China's largest new library's which opened in September 2022. The studio is designing the tallest residential high-rise constructed primarily in timber, known as Rocket & Tigerli in Winterthur, Switzerland, and a new Opera House and Performing Arts venue, known as Green Heart Grand Theatre, in Beijing, China.

== History ==
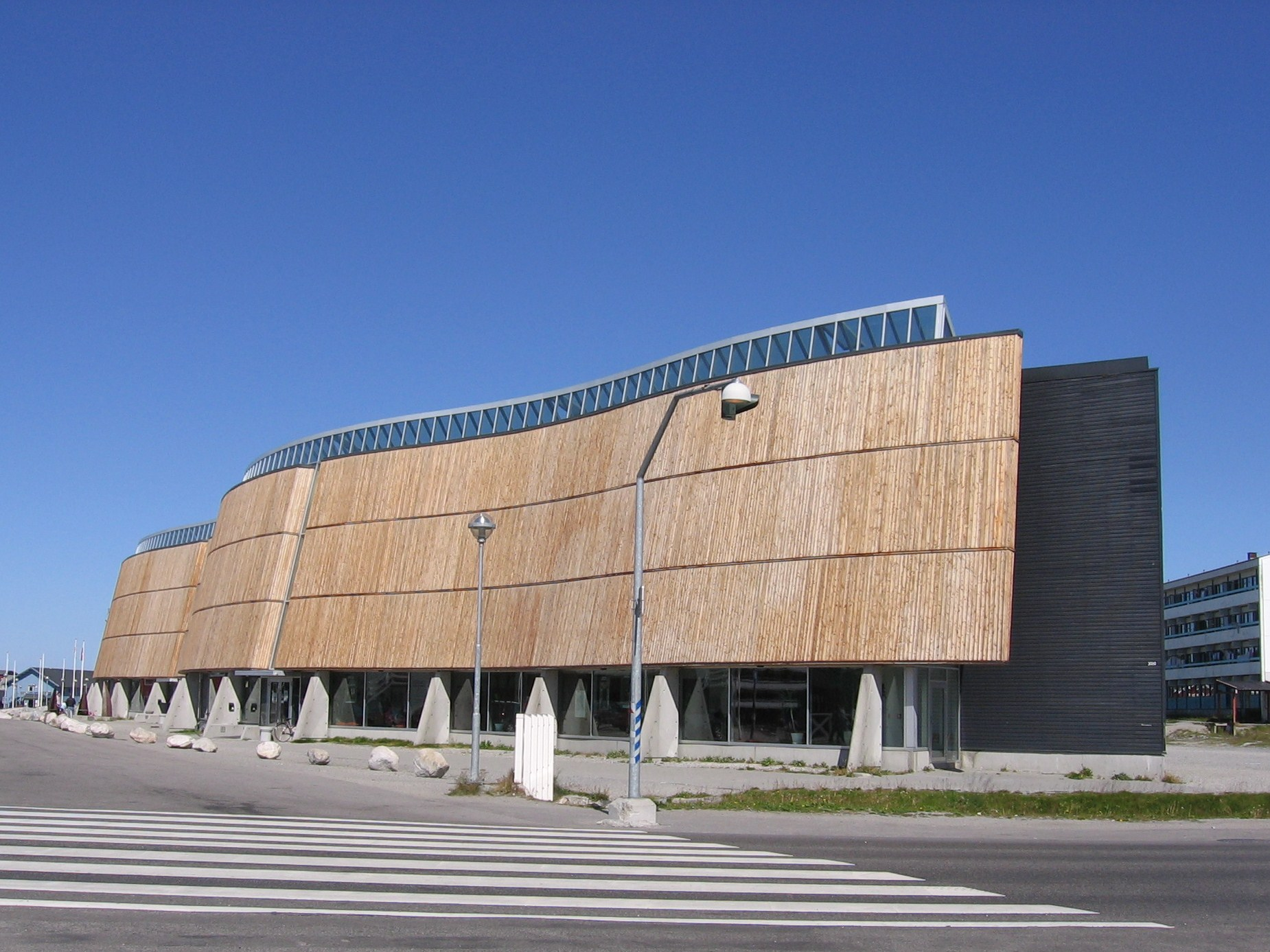
Katuaq Culture Centre in Nuuk, Greenland

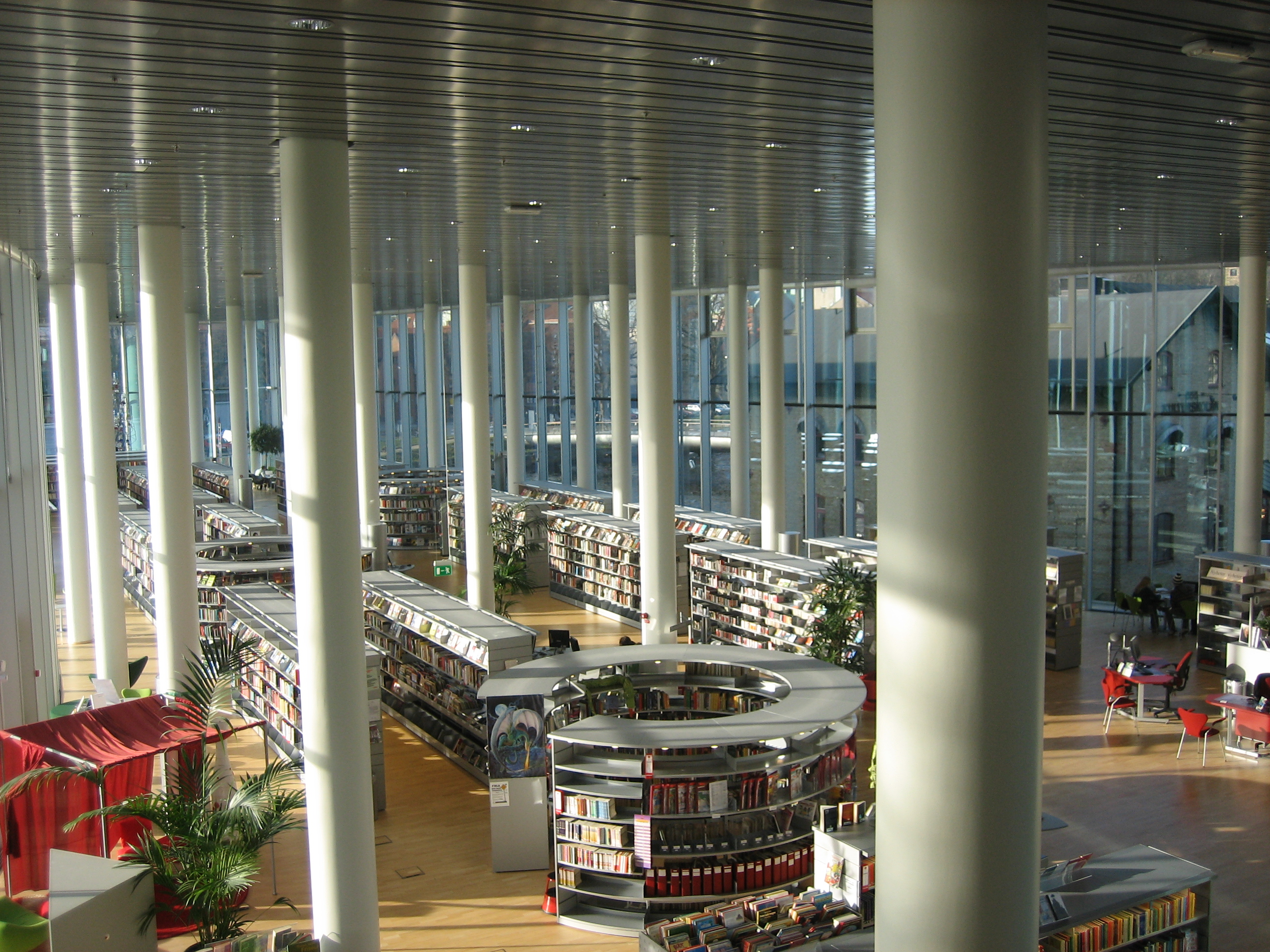
Halmstad Library

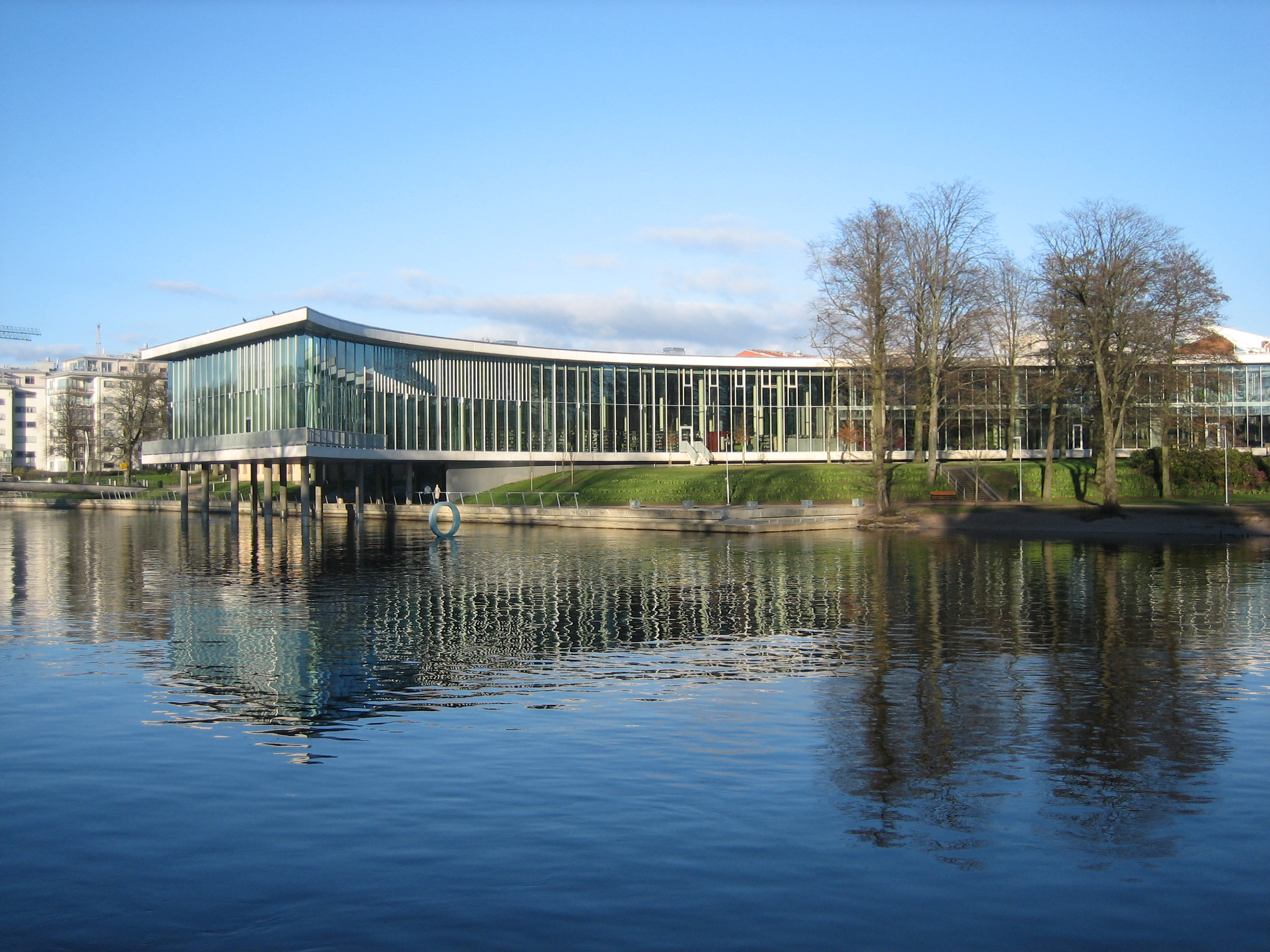
Halmstad Library

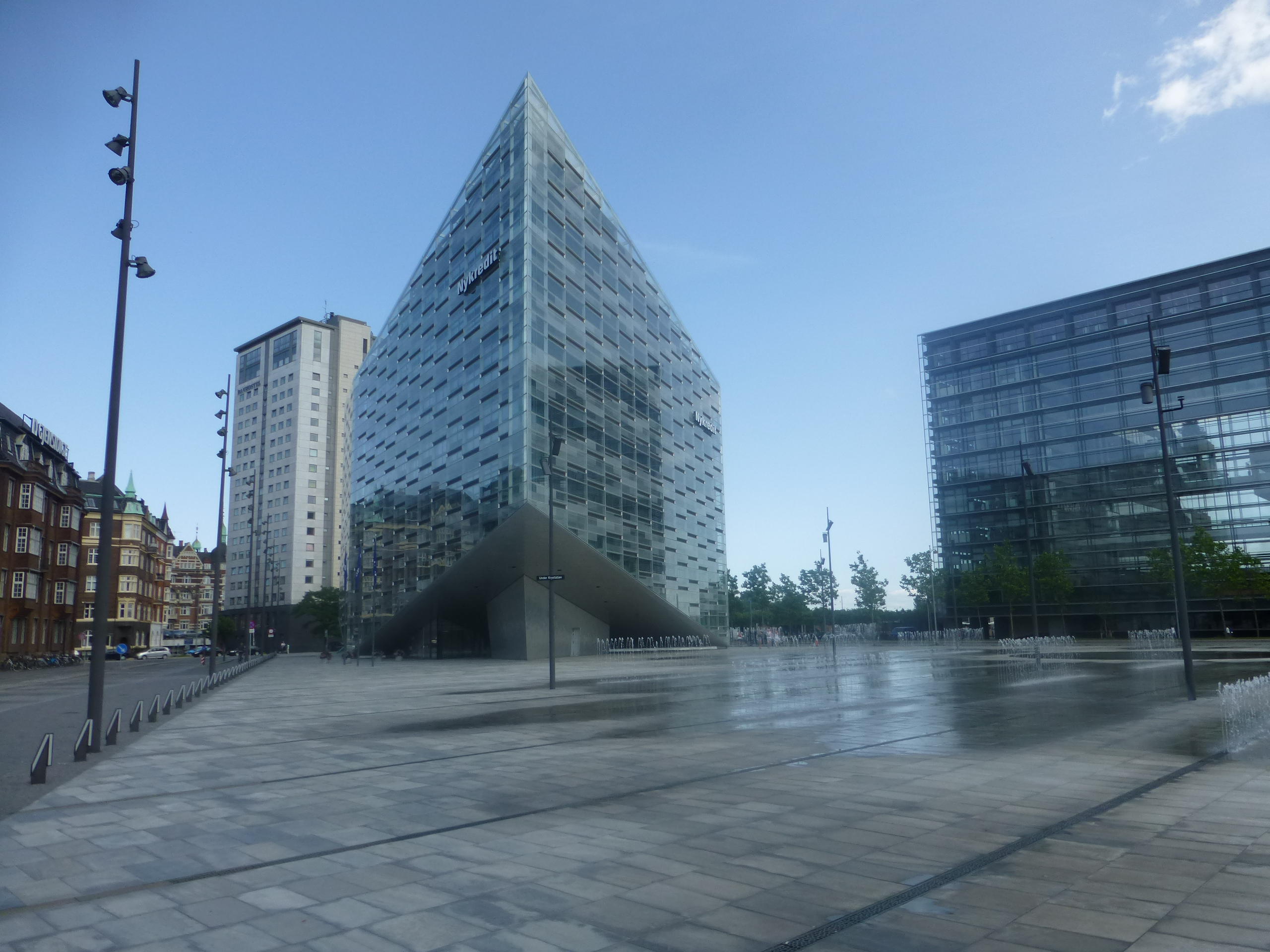
The Crystal in the Vesterbro district in Copenhagen

Schmidt Hammer Lassen was established in 1986 by Morten Schmidt, Bjarne Hammer and John F. Lassen.

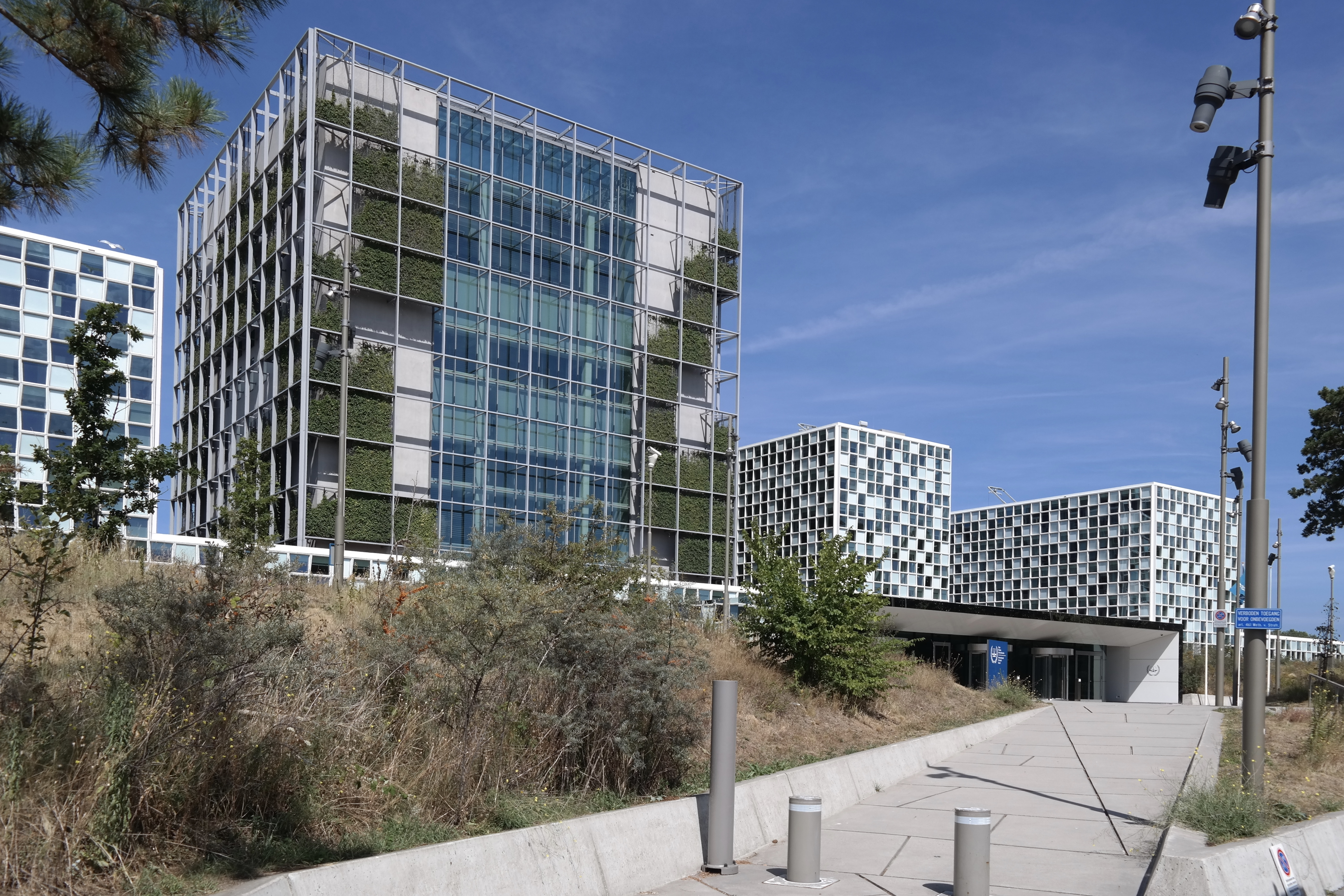
International Criminal Court in The Hague

The partners include CEO Sanne Wall-Gremstrup, Kristian Lars Ahlmark, Elif Tinaztepe, Kasper Heiberg Frandsen, Mads Kaltoft, René Nedergaard, and Chris Hardie.

The practice had its first major project with the Katuaq Culture Centre in Nuuk, Greenland, completed in 1997. The project in Nuuk was followed by first prize in the international competition for the extension of the Danish Royal Library on the harbourfront in Copenhagen. The library extension, also known as the Black Diamond, was completed in 1999.

Another major project is the ARoS Art Museum in Aarhus, Denmark, which was completed in 2004. In May 2011, the art work Your rainbow panorama, by Olafur Eliasson, was officially unveiled on the roof top of the museum.

In 2010, SHL won the competition to design the first permanent premises for the International Criminal Court (ICC) in The Hague, the Netherlands. The project was completed in 2015.

In 2011, SHL established a studio in Shanghai, to serve their increasing client base in Asia. Completed projects include the Ningbo New Library in Ningbo, China (2019), China's largest new library Shanghai Library East (2023), the West Bund Dome Art Center (2024) and the world's largest waste-to-energy power plant called the Shenzhen Energy Ring (2024).

== Product design ==
The product range includes light fixtures for Philips Lighting, Lampas and Focus, indoor furniture Piiroinen and DJOB Montana, outdoor street furniture for Veksoe. Designs include the Flakes chair, the Focus Lighting, Idea Water Fixtures and the Swan Neck. The design department also creates pieces such as the sculptural receptions desk at Danfoss.

== Selected works ==
- The Rocket & Tigerli, Winterthur
- ARoS - The Next Level, Aarhus
- Boston Commonwealth Pier, Boston
- Shanghai Library East, Shanghai
- DOKK1, Aarhus
- Vectura CampusF, Stockholm
- NIO House Hefei, Hefei
- The Spinning Mills, Vejle
- The International Criminal Court (ICC), The Hague
- Victory Silos, Toronto
- UBC Gateway, Vancouver
- TŪRANGA - Christchurch Central Library, Christchurch
- State Library Victoria, Victoria
- NIO House Berlin, Berlin
- VIA, Oslo
- Malmö Live, Malmö
- West Bund Dome Art Center, Shanghai
- Fisketorvet, Copenhagen
- NIO House Oslo, Oslo
- Leeds General Infirmary, Leeds
- Katuaq Cultural Centre, Nuuk
- The Royal Library - The Black Diamond, Copenhagen
- Dahlerup's Tower, Copenhagen
- ARoS Aarhus Kunstmuseum, Aarhus
- International Business College, Kolding
- Sports & Culture Campus Gellerup, Gellerup
- Aalborg Airport, Aalborg
- The Culture Island, Middelfart
- Halmstad Library, Halmstad
- Växjö Library, Växjö
- Fregatten Jylland, Ebeltoft
- Amazon Court, Prague
- Thor Heyerdahl Upper Secondary School, Larvik
- Aalborg Universitety Hospital, Aalborg

== Awards ==
- 1997 Nykredit Architecture Prize
- 2007 MIPIM AR Future Projects Award ('residential' category) for Skytthusbugten
- 2008 LEAF Award, Grand Prix for Performers House
- 2008 MIPIM AR Future Projects Award ('office' category) for Amazon Court
- 2009 Construction and Investment Journal Award ('Best Office Development') for Amazon Court
- 2009 MIPIM AR Future Projects Award ('mixed use' category) for Holbæk Harbour Masterplan
- 2011 New London Award ('learning' category) for City of Westminster College
- 2011 LEAF Award ('structural design' category) for The Crystal
- 2011 Aarhus Municipality Award for Villa Busk/ Vibevej 27, Denmark
- 2011 The Concrete Society Awards, shortlisted for City of Westminster College, England
- 2011 ArchDaily Building of the Year Award for the Crystal, Denmark
- 2012 Arne of the Year Award, shortlisted for The Crystal, Denmark
- 2012 RIBA Award, EU category, shortlisted for The Crystal, Denmark
- 2012 Civic Society Award for University of Aberdeen New Library, UK
- 2013 IABSE Denmark's Structure Award for the Crystal in Copenhagen
- 2013 RIAS Award 2013 for University of Aberdeen New Library, UK
- 2013 RIBA Award 2013 for University of Aberdeen New Library, UK
- 2014 Lieutenant Governor's Design Award in Architecture for Halifax Central Library
- 2019 Urban Renewal GOLD Award, China Real Estate Design Award for Beijing Vanke Times Center
- 2022 Fortune Magazine Design Award for Ningbo New Library
- 2022 Shanghai Magnolia Award for Shanghai Library East
- 2022 China Construction Luban Prize for Shanghai Library East
- 2022 AIA Honor Award China Design Excellence Award for Shanghai Library East
- 2023 AIA Honor Award for International Architecture, AIA International Design Award for Shanghai Library East
The Black Diamond in Copenhagen

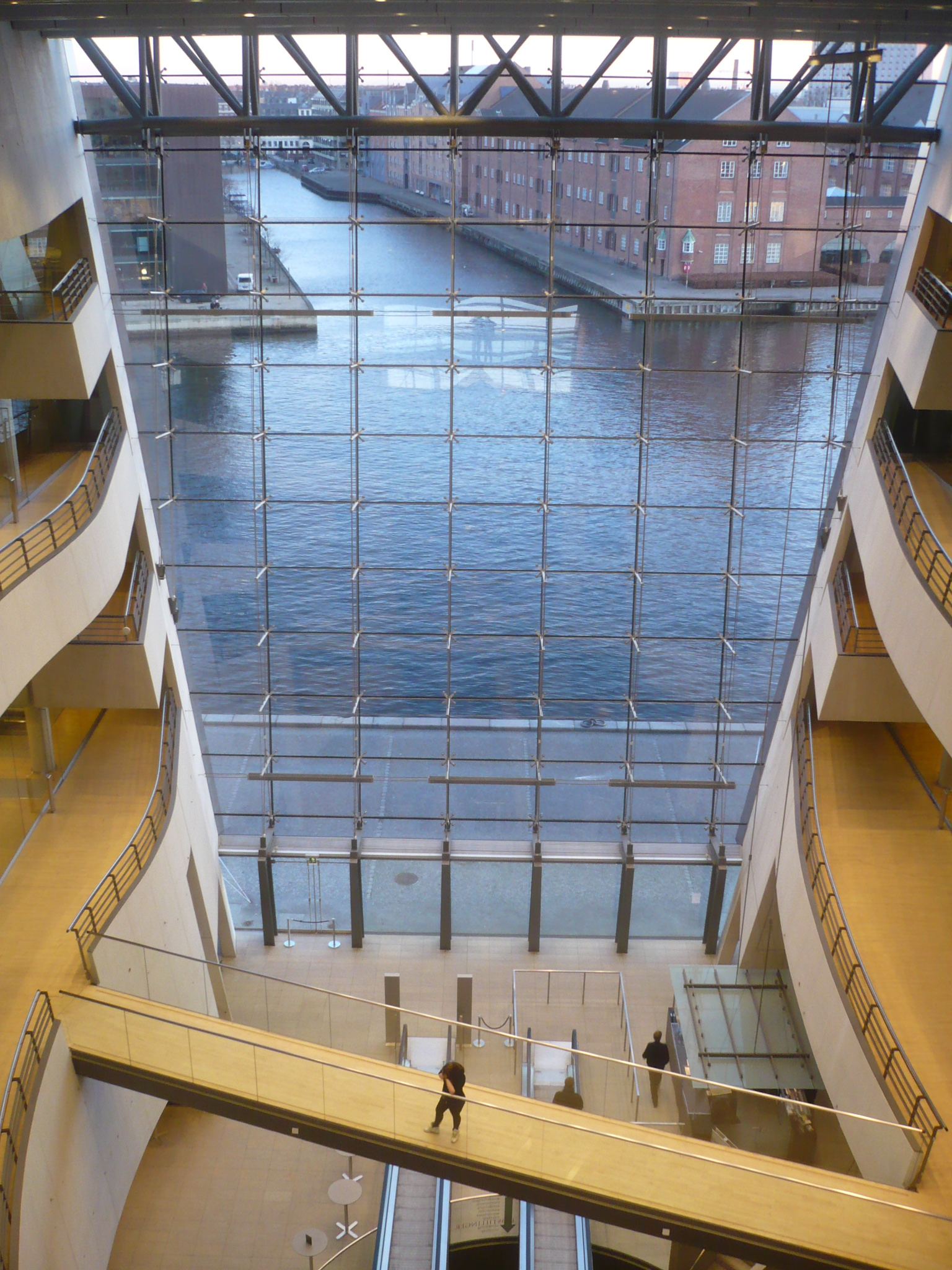

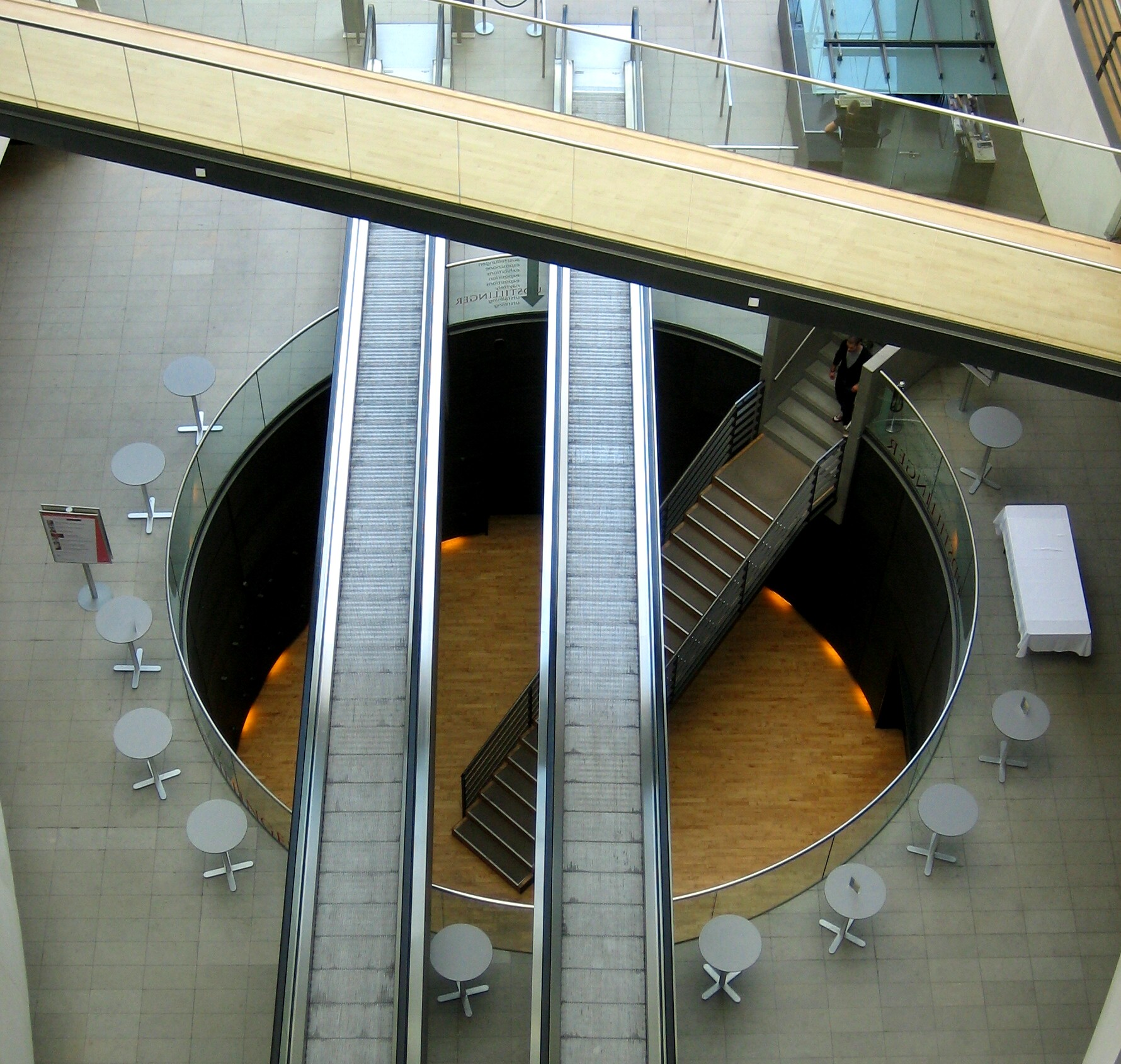

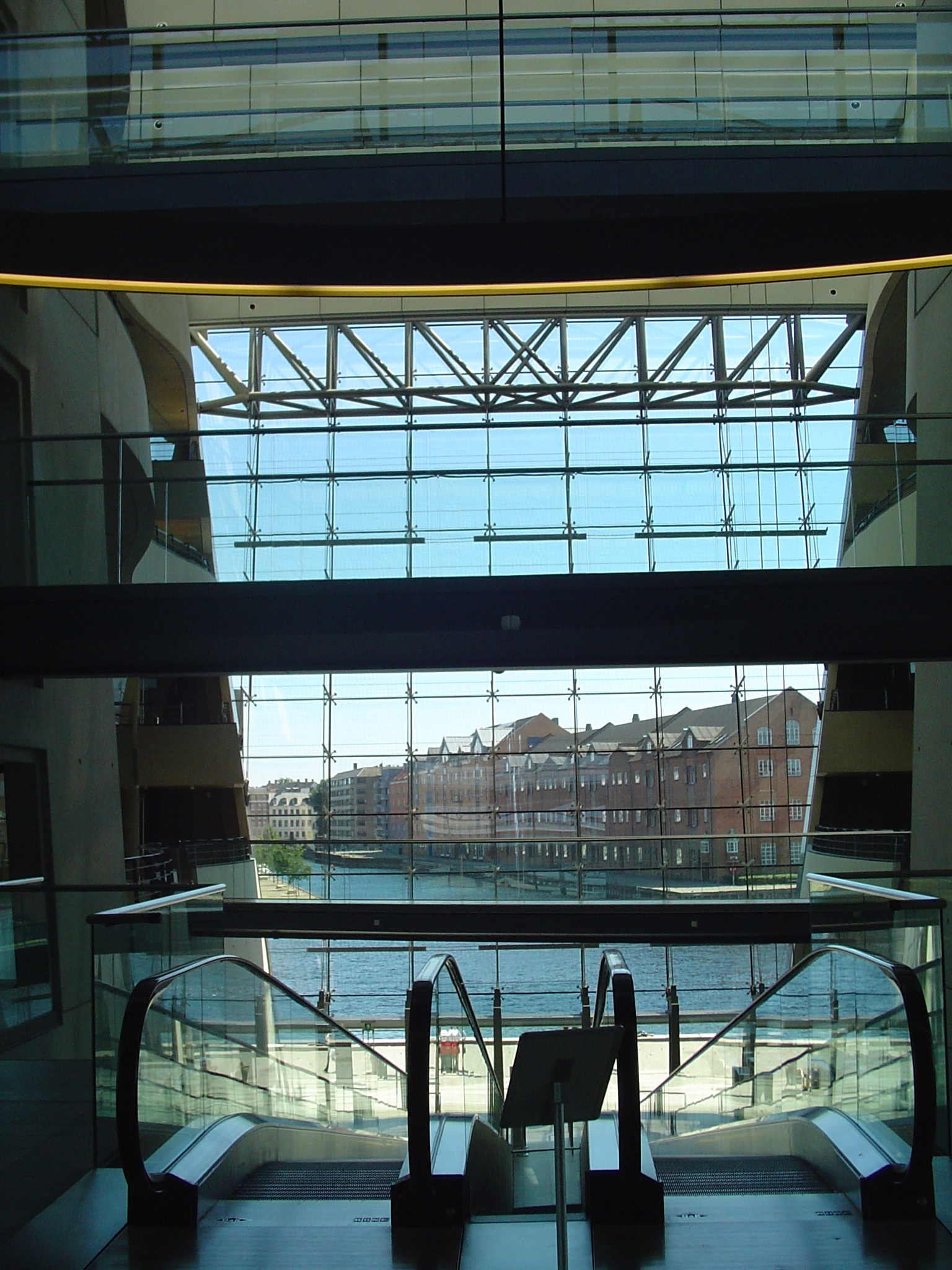

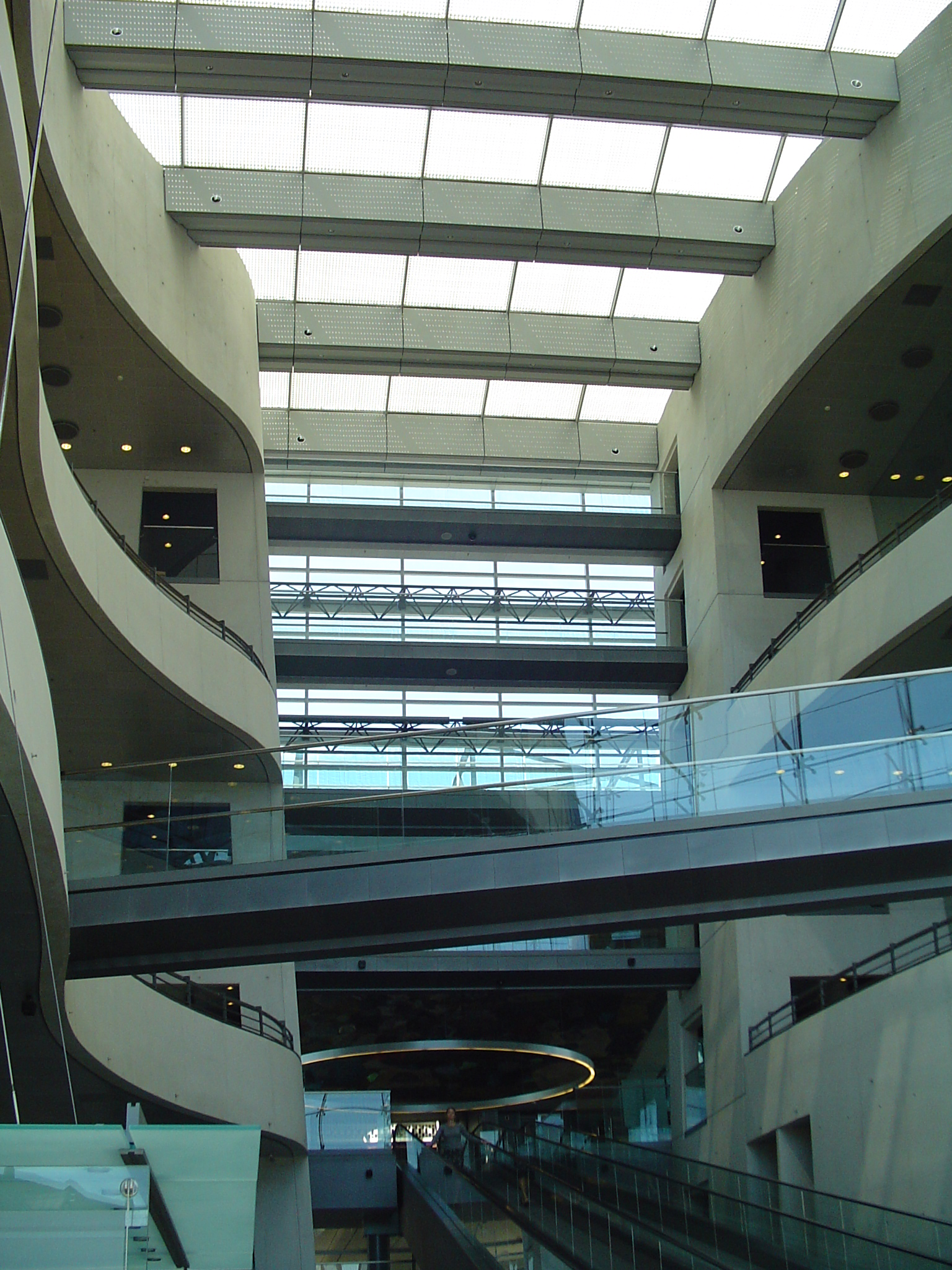

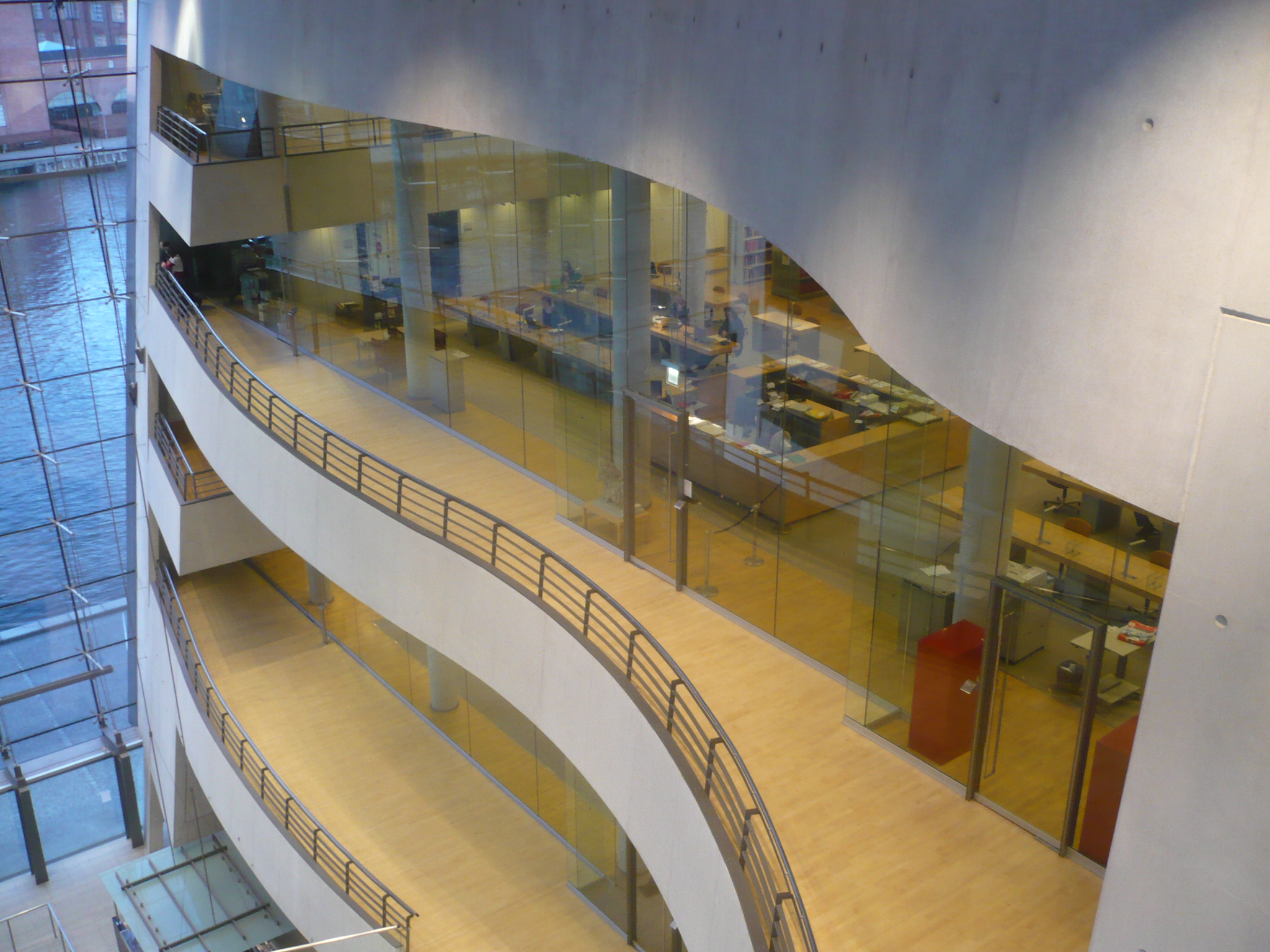

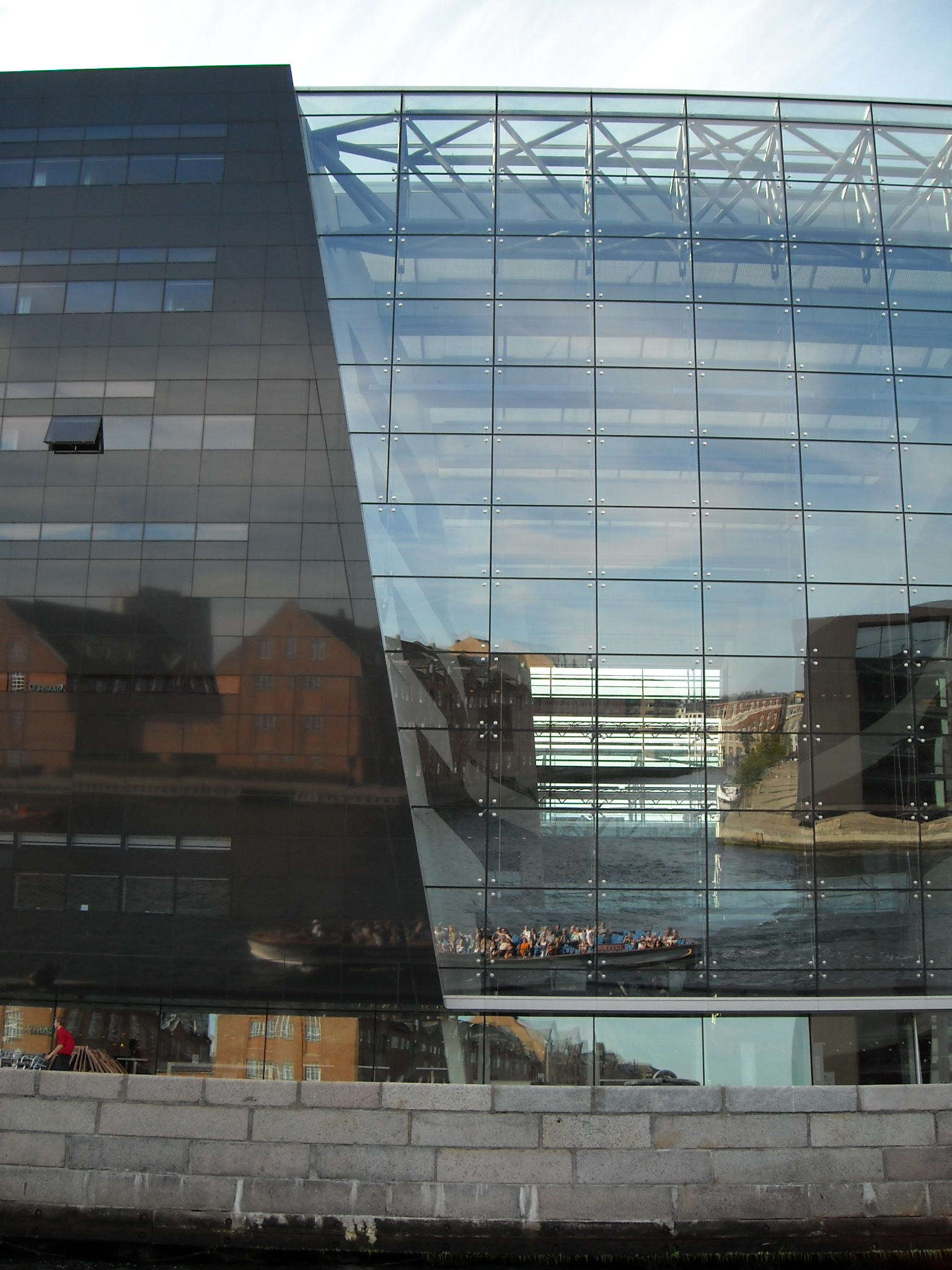

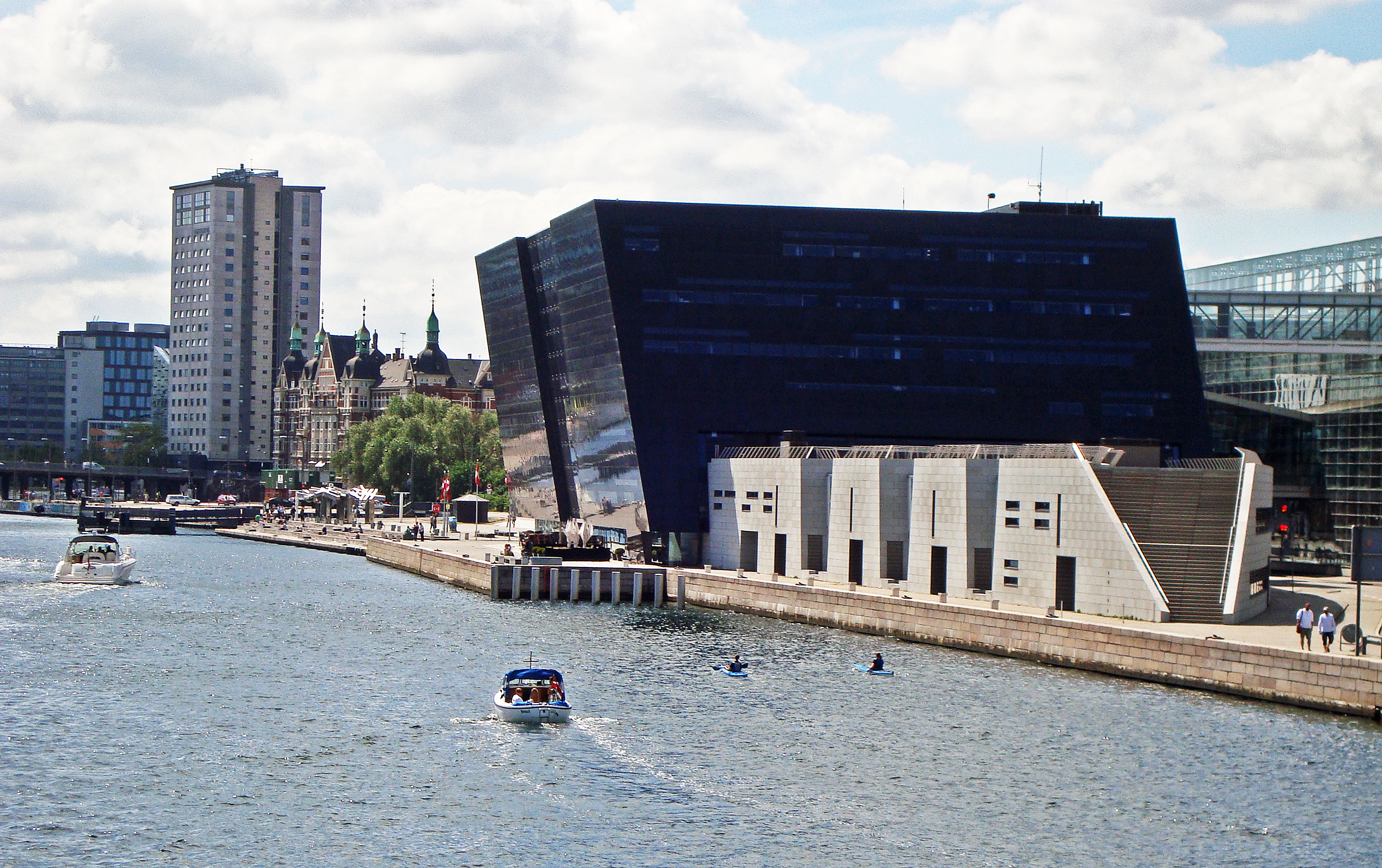

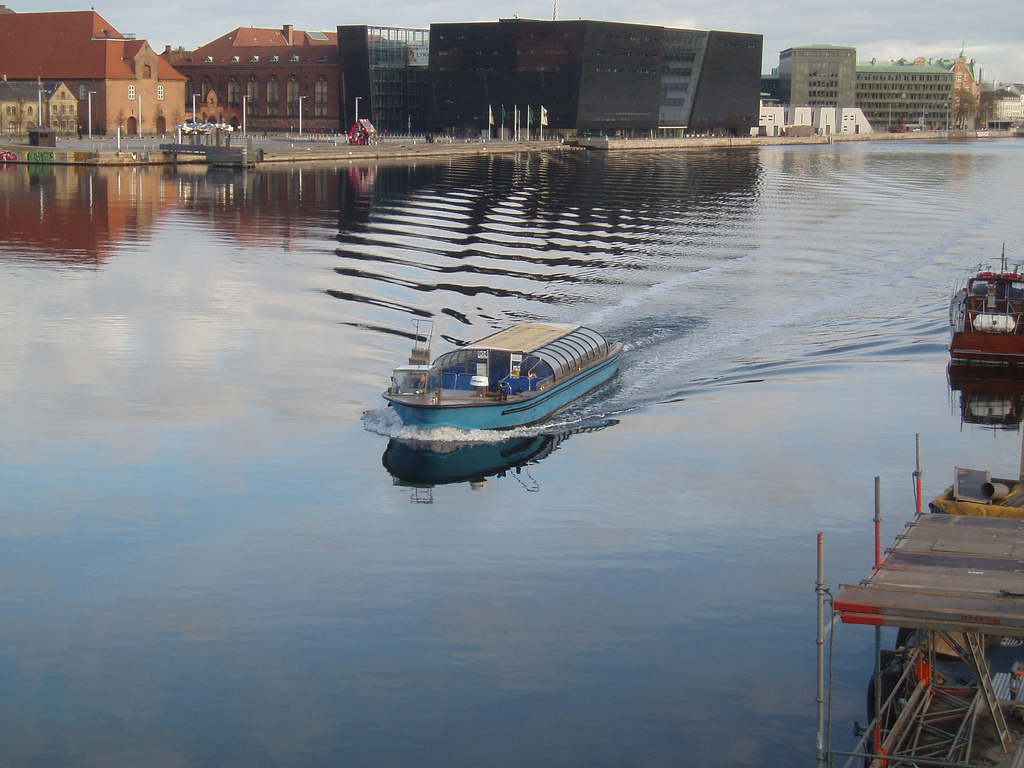
