= Piirainen =

Piirainen is a Finnish surname. Notable people with the surname include:

- Elisabeth Piirainen (1943–2017), German linguist
- Holly Piirainen (1983–1993), American murder victim
- Jaakko Piirainen (1871–1917), Finnish master carpenter and politician
- Raimo Piirainen (born 1952), Finnish politician

== Similar names ==
- Piironen
- Piiroinen
