= Signe Kongebro =

Danish architect and educator (born 1972)

- Born: 12 May 1972 (age 54); Copenhagen
- Education: Royal Danish Academy of Fine Arts
- Occupation: Architect
- Practice: Henning Larsen Architects
- Design: Design with knowledge

Signe Kongebro (born 1972) is a Danish architect and educator. She is a partner at Henning Larsen Architects in Copenhagen where she heads the department for sustainability.

== Biography ==
Kongebro studied architecture at the Royal Danish Academy of Fine Arts, graduating in 1999. In 2001, she joined Henning Larsen Architects, where, since 2007, she has been an associate partner and headed the firm's sustainability department. Her research has revealed the critical importance of daylight in architectural design, in view of its contribution to sustainability and energy efficiency. More generally, her research has centred on the importance of adopting a sustainable design approach to reduce energy consumption of buildings in operation.

The book Design with knowledge, edited by Kronebro, presents the results of research into design and energy consumption conducted by postgraduate engineers at the Technical University of Denmark. A key conclusion is that architects and engineers should collaborate closely in the building design process in order to apply recent developments in climate and energy studies. Kongebro provides the following explanation:

Right from the introductory design phases, we need to ensure that a building does not use more energy than necessary. That is the cheapest way to minimise energy consumption and in the future it will be essential. Sustainability requirements are becoming stricter and these challenges cannot be met by means of technology alone.

Kongebro's work has revealed that 40 percent of a building's energy consumption depends on design. It can be halved if the necessary design criteria are applied from the start. As a result, sustainability has become a competitive factor for Henning Larsen Architects.

== Selected publications ==
- Kongebro, Signe, ed. (2012). Design with knowledge: new research in sustainable building. Henning Larsen Architects. ISBN 9788799308132.
- Kongebro, Signe, ed. (2012). Hvad med dagslys?: Designmanual med forslag til helhedsrenovering (in Danish). Henning Larsen Architects. ISBN 978-87-993081-2-5.
