= Louis Becker =

Danish architect (born 1962)

Louis Becker (born 1962) is a Danish architect and professor (Adj.), and the global design principal at Henning Larsen Architects.

In 2008 Becker was appointed adjunct professor at the Department of Architecture and Design at Aalborg University. In 2011 he received the Eckersberg Medal by the Academic Council, The Royal Danish Academy of Fine Arts as a recognition of his achievements of putting Danish architecture on the world map.
