= Mette Kynne Frandsen =

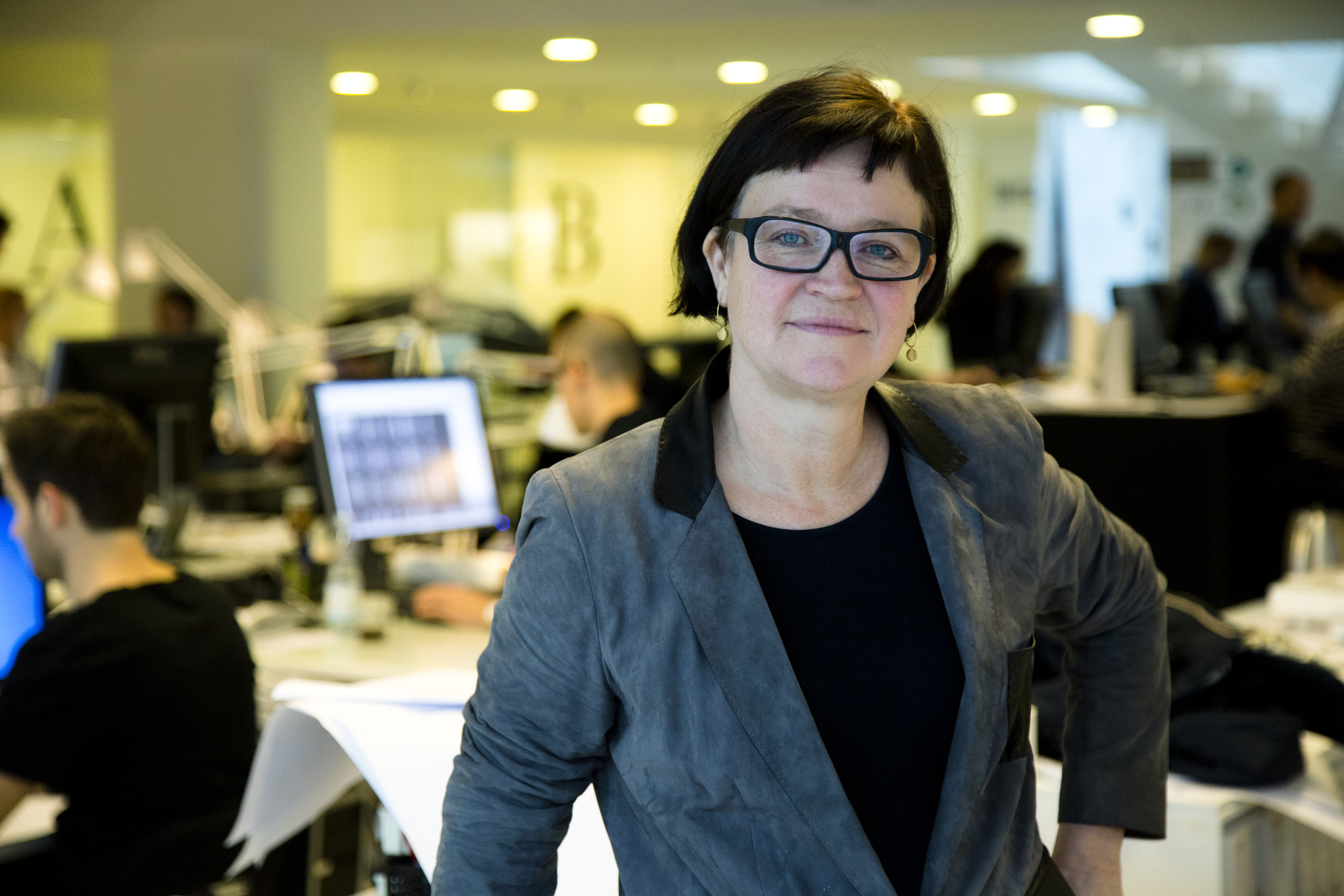
Mette Kynne Frandsen

Mette Kynne Fransen (born 1960) is CEO and Partner at Henning Larsen Architects. She has been a part of the management team at the company since 1998 and was appointed CEO in 2003.

Mette Kynne Frandsen holds a number of positions of trust. She is deputy chair of the board in The Trade Council of Denmark and in The Royal Danish Academy of Fine Arts, Schools of Architecture, Design and Conservation. She is also a member of the board at JP/Politikens Hus - a Danish news media agency.

In 2012, she was elected Female Role Model of the Year by a design building industry magazine.
