= Henning Larsen Architects =

Design and architecture firm

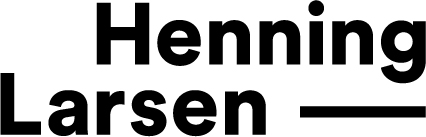

Practice information
- Partners: Mette Kynne Frandsen; Louis Becker; Signe Kongebro
- Founded: 1959
- Location: Copenhagen

Significant works and honors
- Buildings: Ministry of Foreign Affairs, Riyadh; The Roland Levinsky Building; Harpa; Moesgaard Museum
- Awards: 2013 European Union Prize for Contemporary Architecture

Website
- henninglarsen.com

Henning Larsen Architects is an international architectural firm based in Copenhagen, Denmark. Founded in 1959 by Henning Larsen, it has around 750 employees.

In 2008, it opened an office in Riyadh, Saudi Arabia and in 2011, an office in Munich, Germany were inaugurated. The company also have offices in New York USA, Oslo, Norway, in the Faroe Islands, and in Hong Kong, China.

It is known for its cultural and educational projects. Among them Harpa Concert Hall and Conference Centre in Reykjavík that was selected as one of the ten best concert halls in the world by the British magazine Gramophone and won the Mies van der Rohe Award 2013, the European Union Prize for Contemporary Architecture. It also designed the Copenhagen Opera.

It is part of the Ramboll Group.

== Research and sustainability ==
The practice has employed PhD students from the Technical University of Denmark, who work with different projects related to sustainable design. The aim of the collaboration is to implement sustainability in the building design and building components at the very beginning of each project.

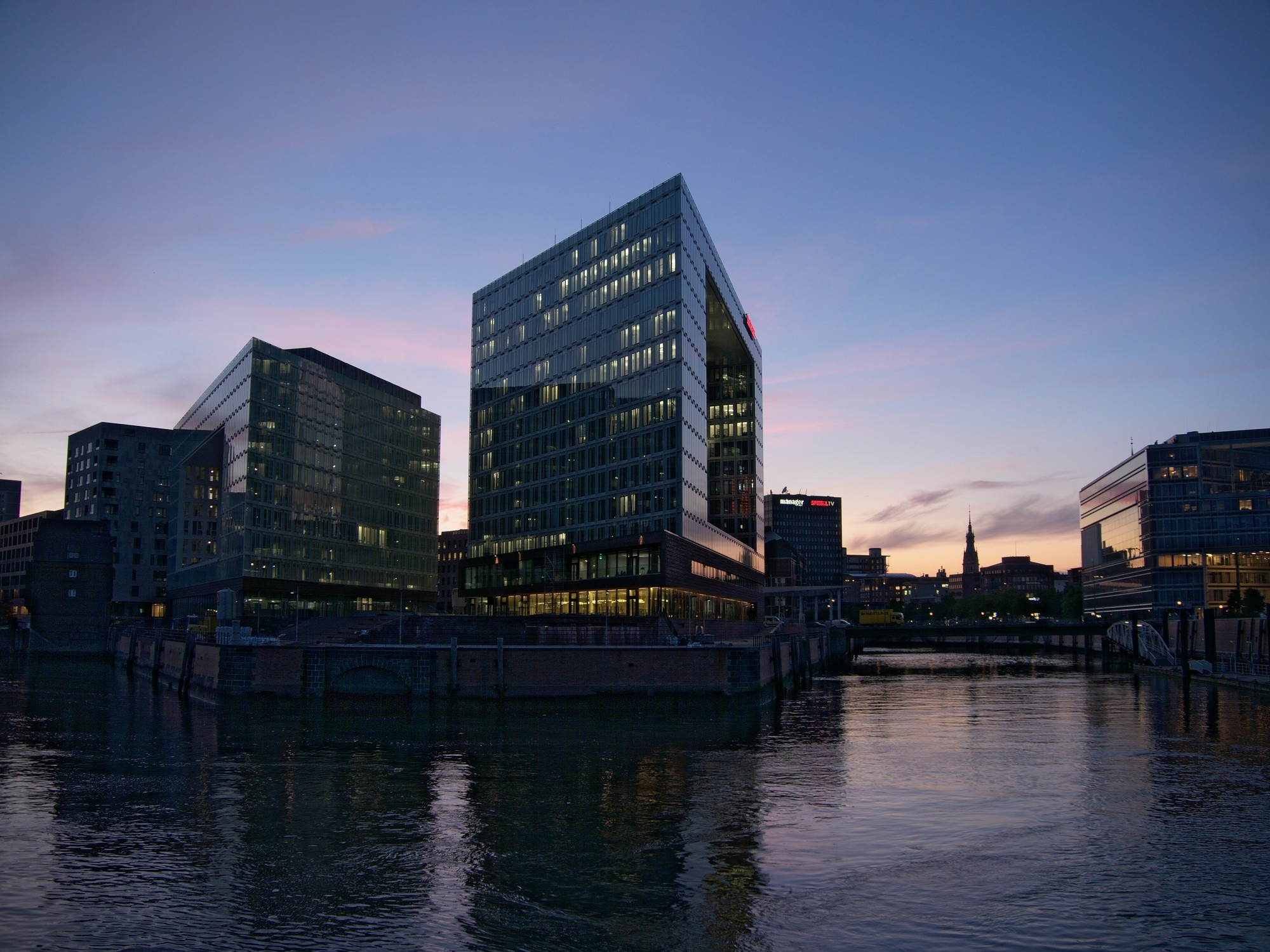
Spiegel House, Hamburg, Germany

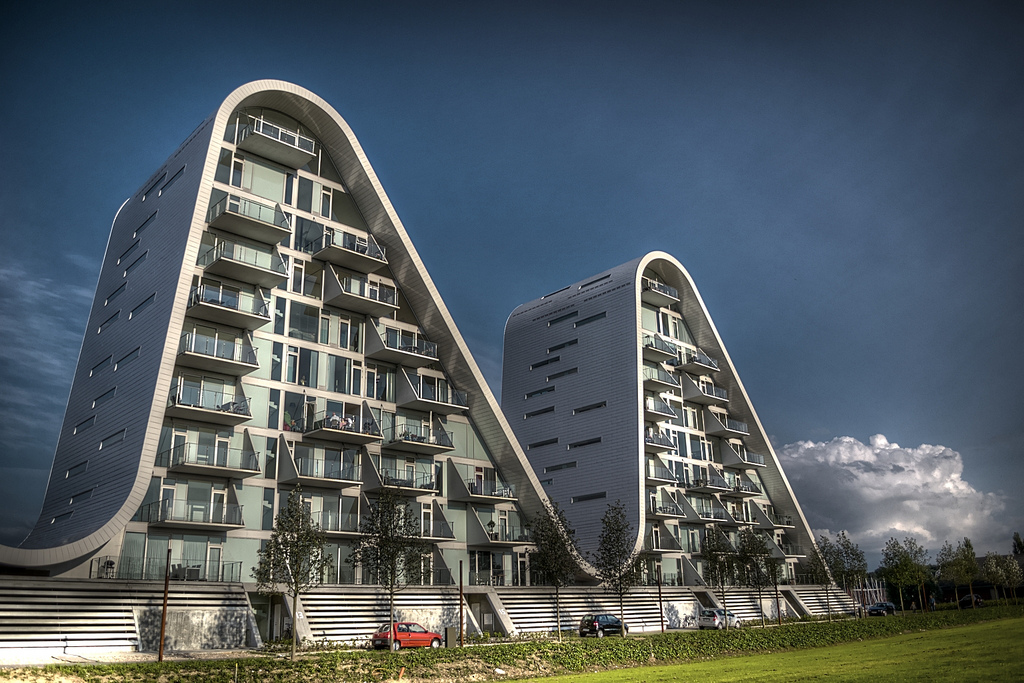
The Wave in Vejle, Vejle, Denmark

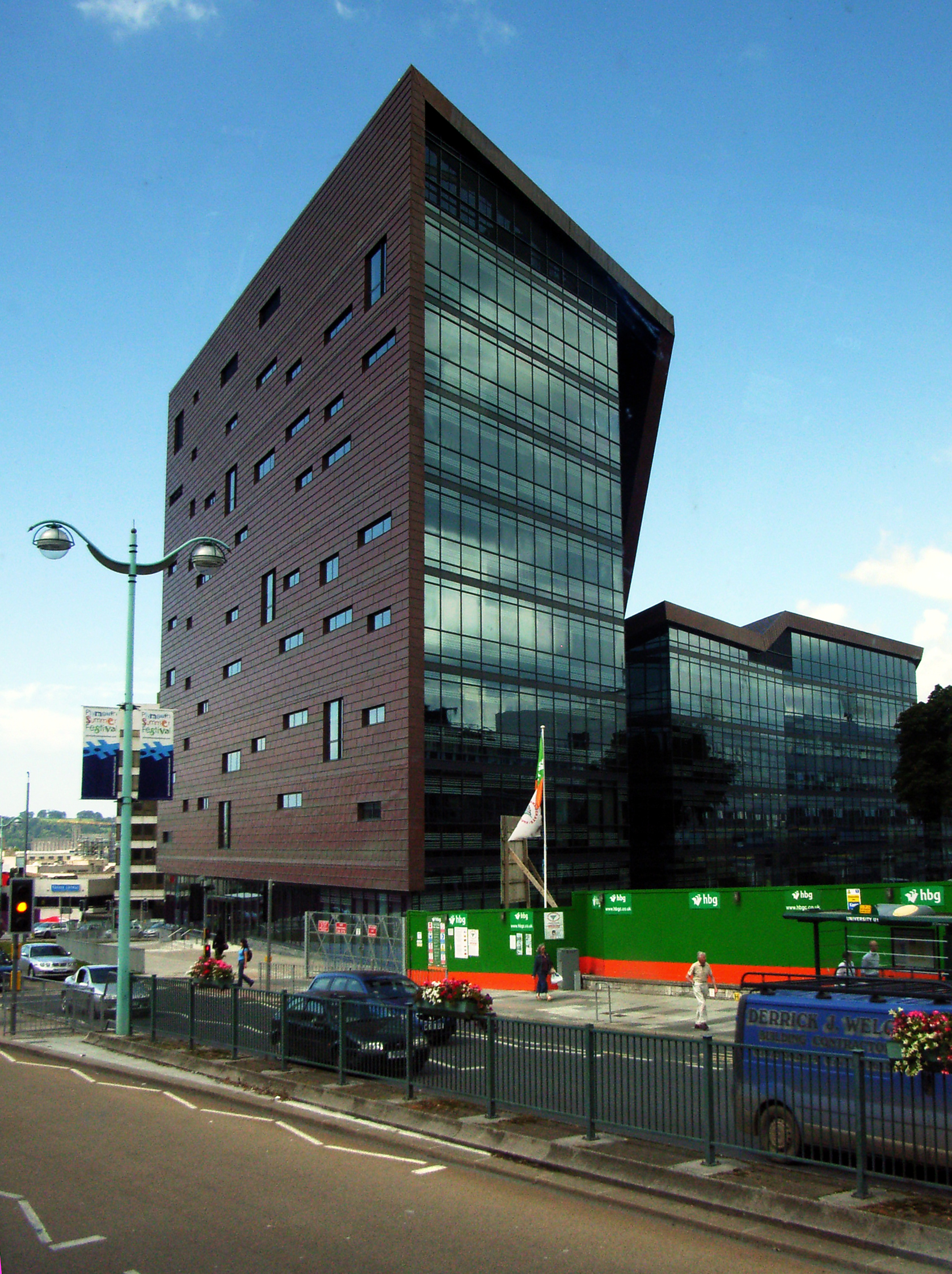
Roland Levinsky Building, Plymouth, United Kingdom

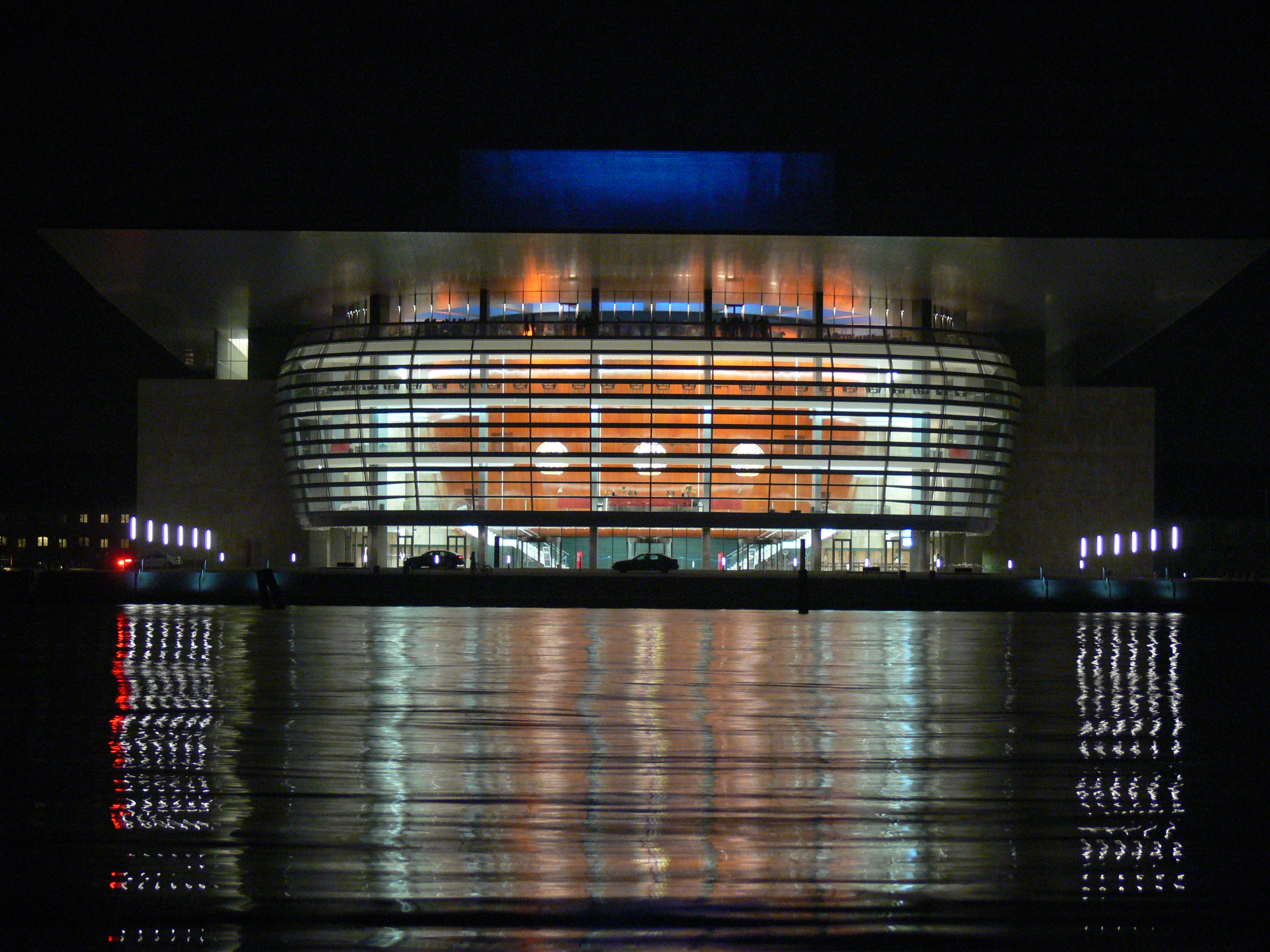
Copenhagen Opera House, Copenhagen, Denmark

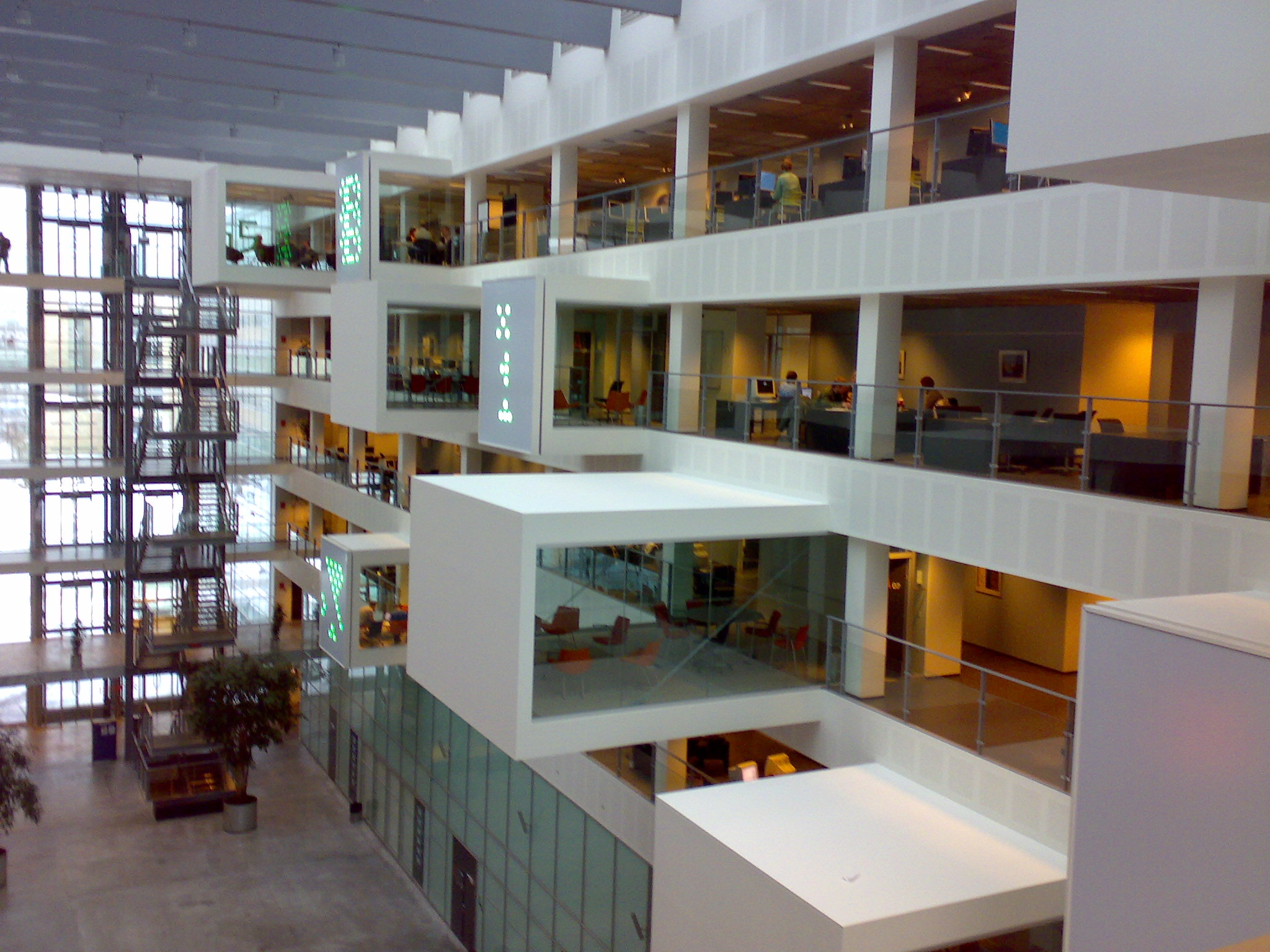
IT University of Copenhagen, Copenhagen Denmark

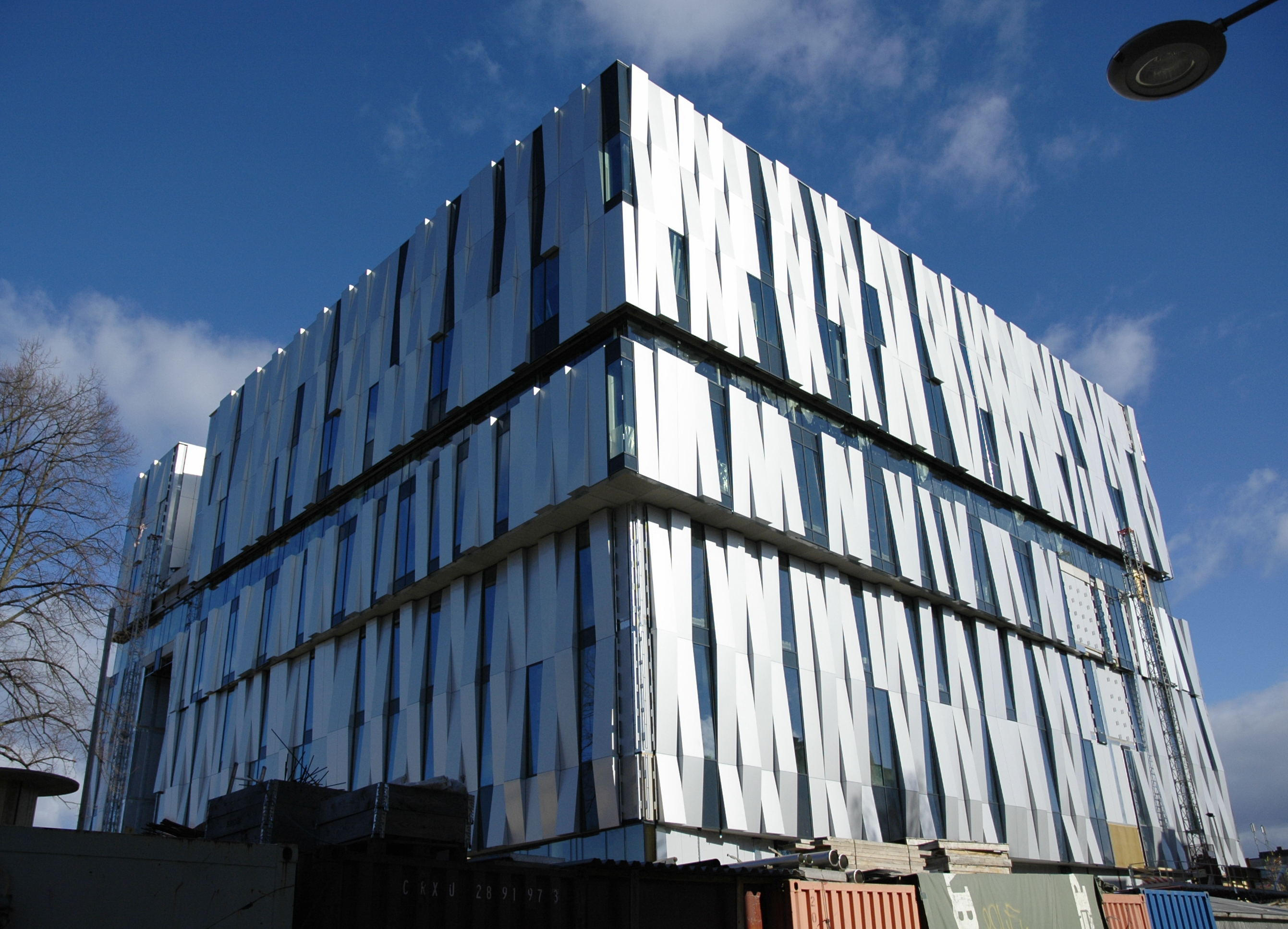
Uppsala Concert Hall, Uppsala, Sweden

== Selected projects ==
=== Completed ===
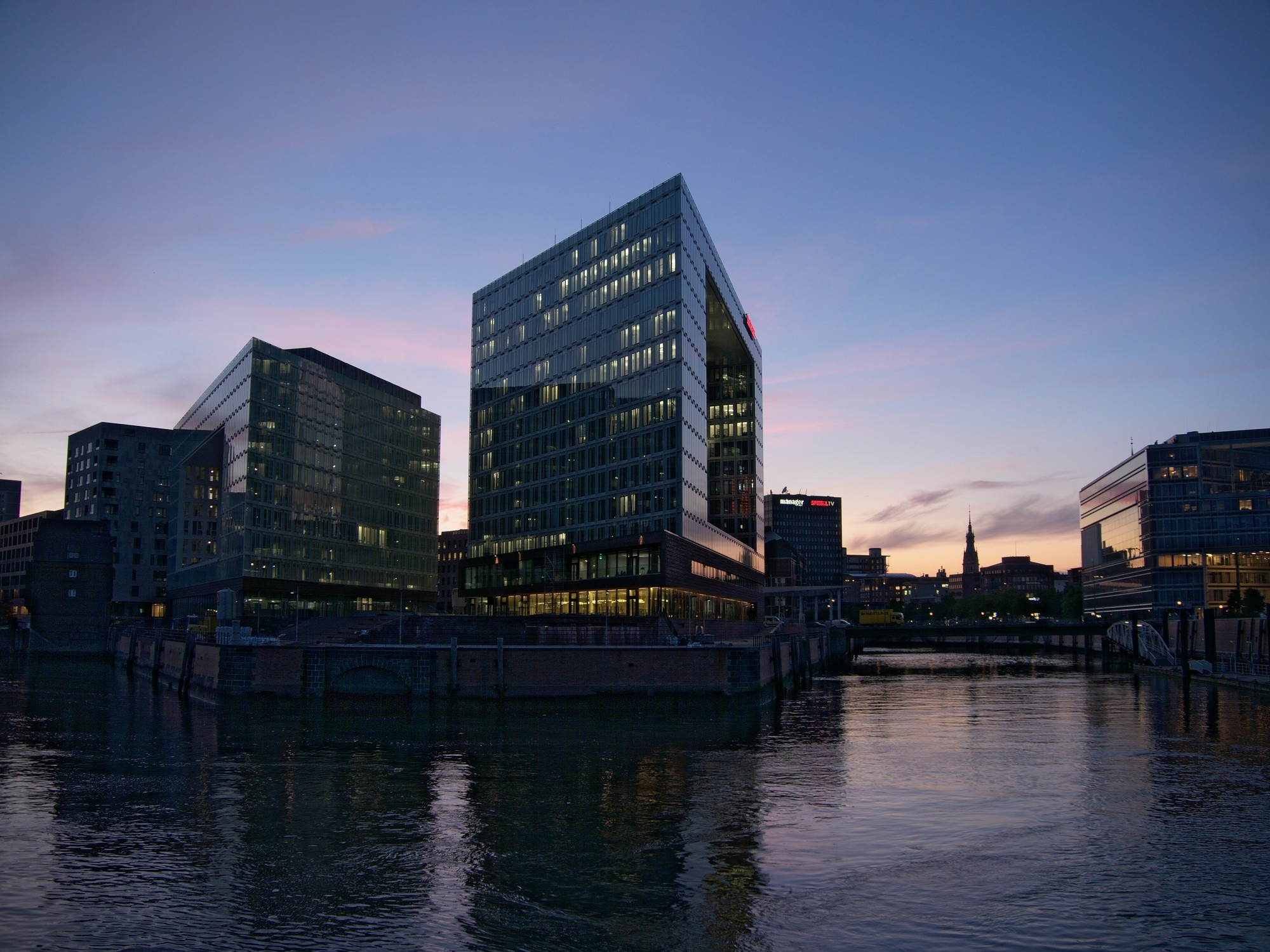
Spiegel House, Hamburg, Germany

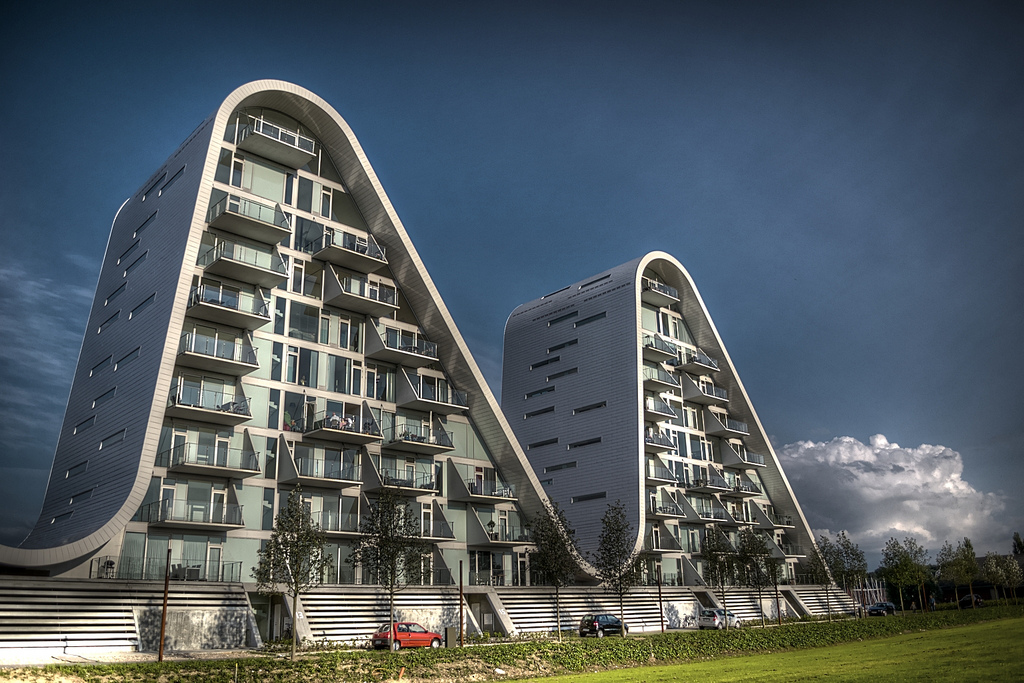
The Wave in Vejle, Vejle, Denmark

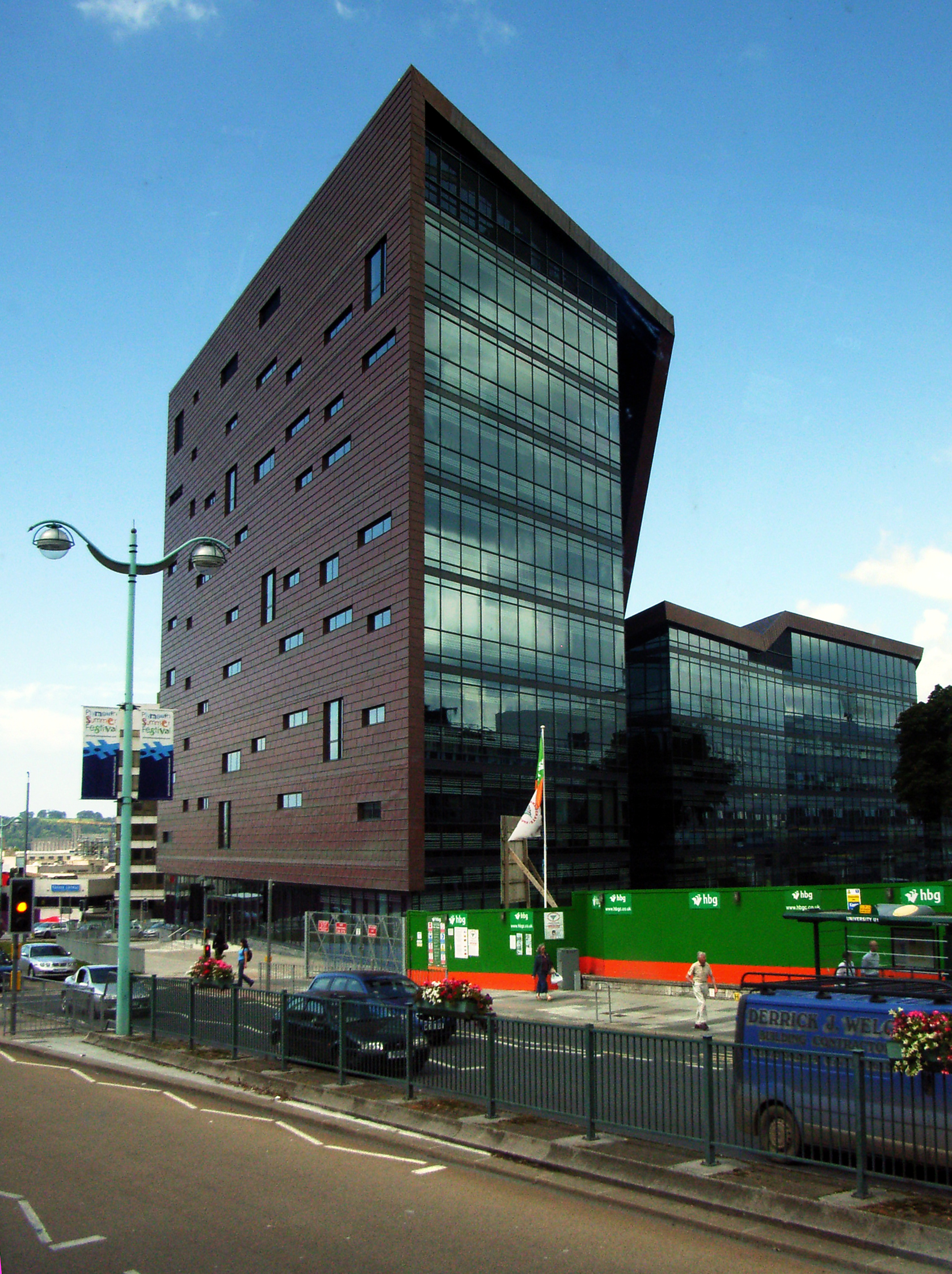
Roland Levinsky Building, Plymouth, United Kingdom

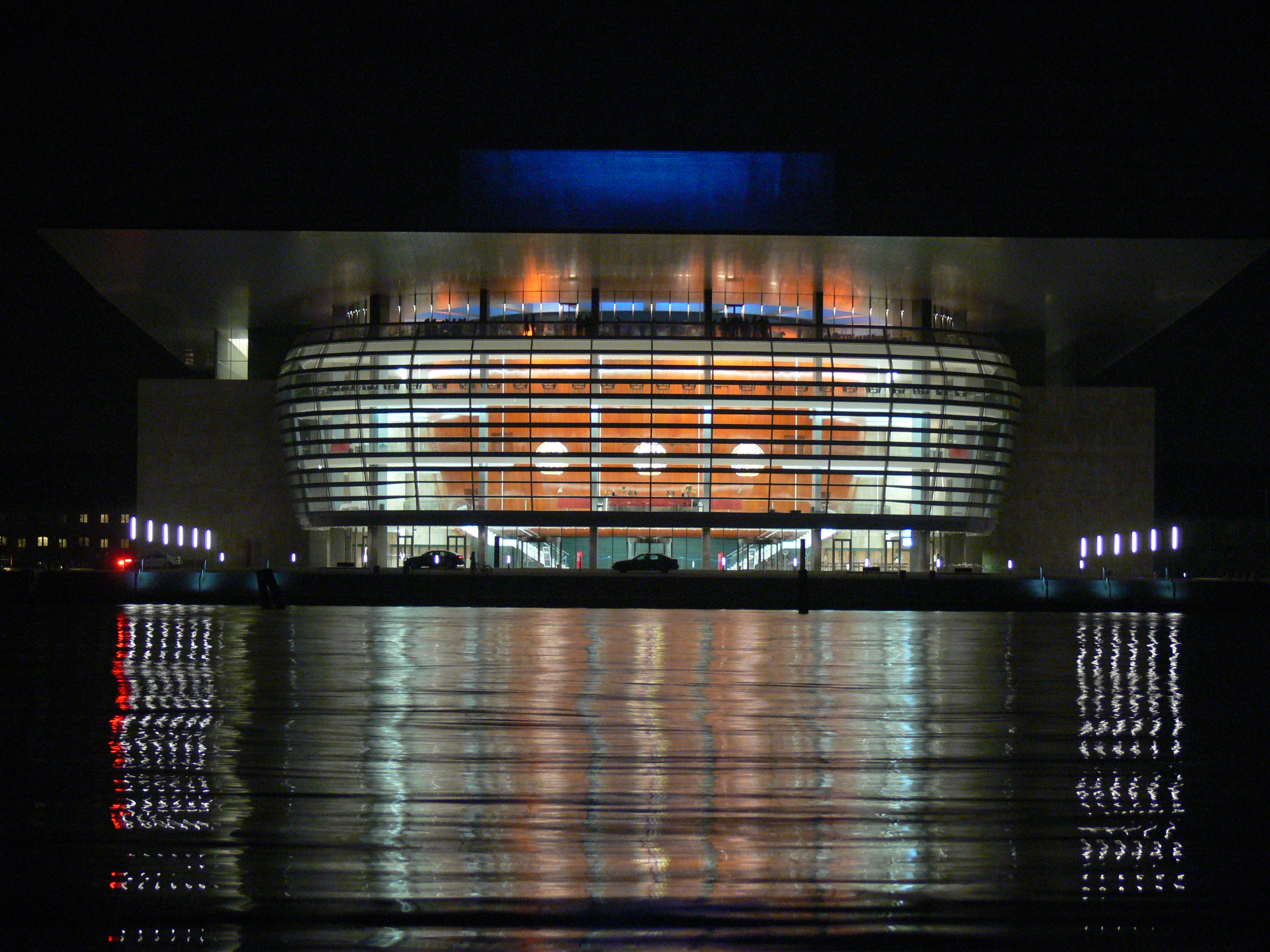
Copenhagen Opera House, Copenhagen, Denmark

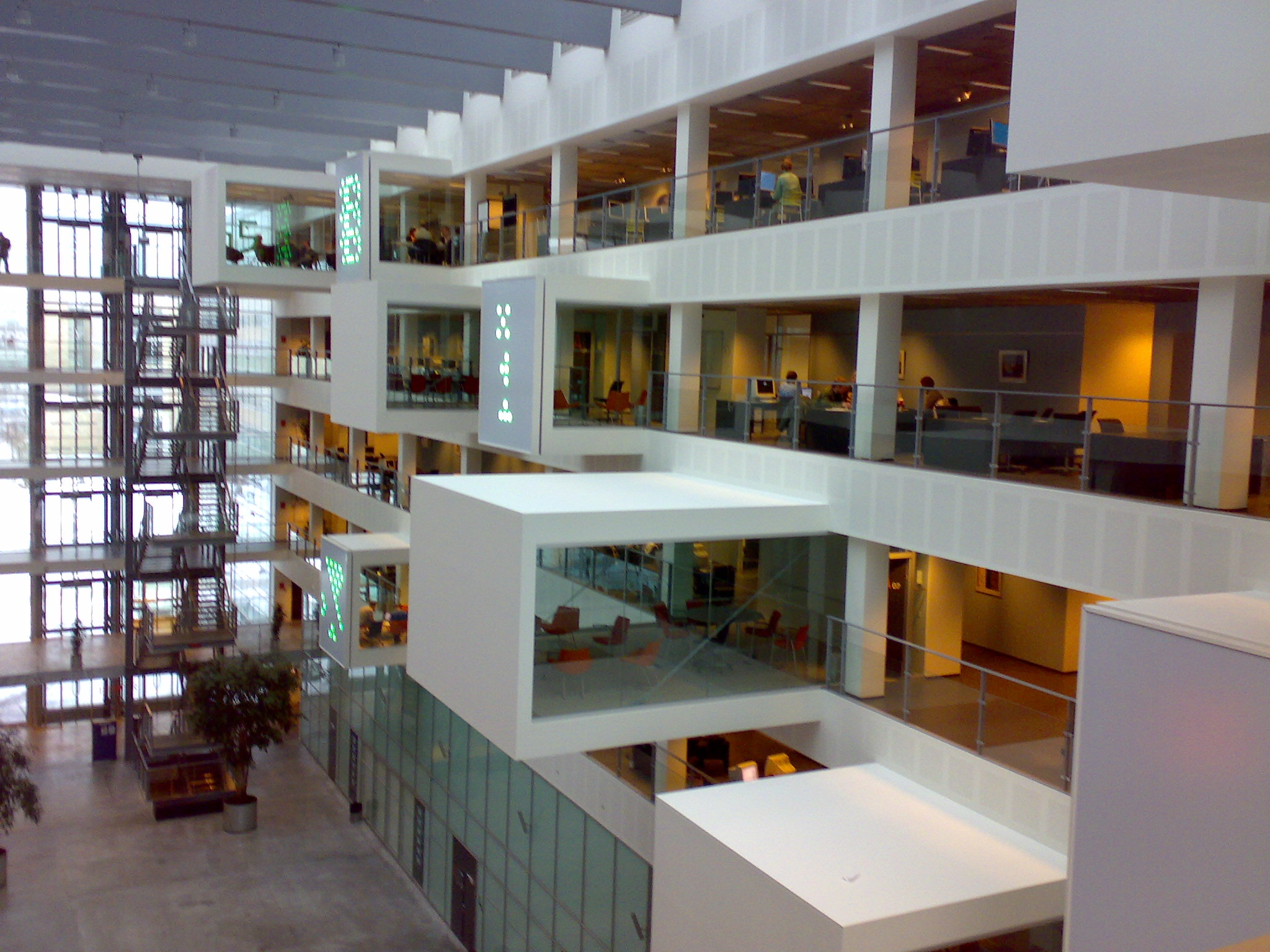
IT University of Copenhagen, Copenhagen Denmark

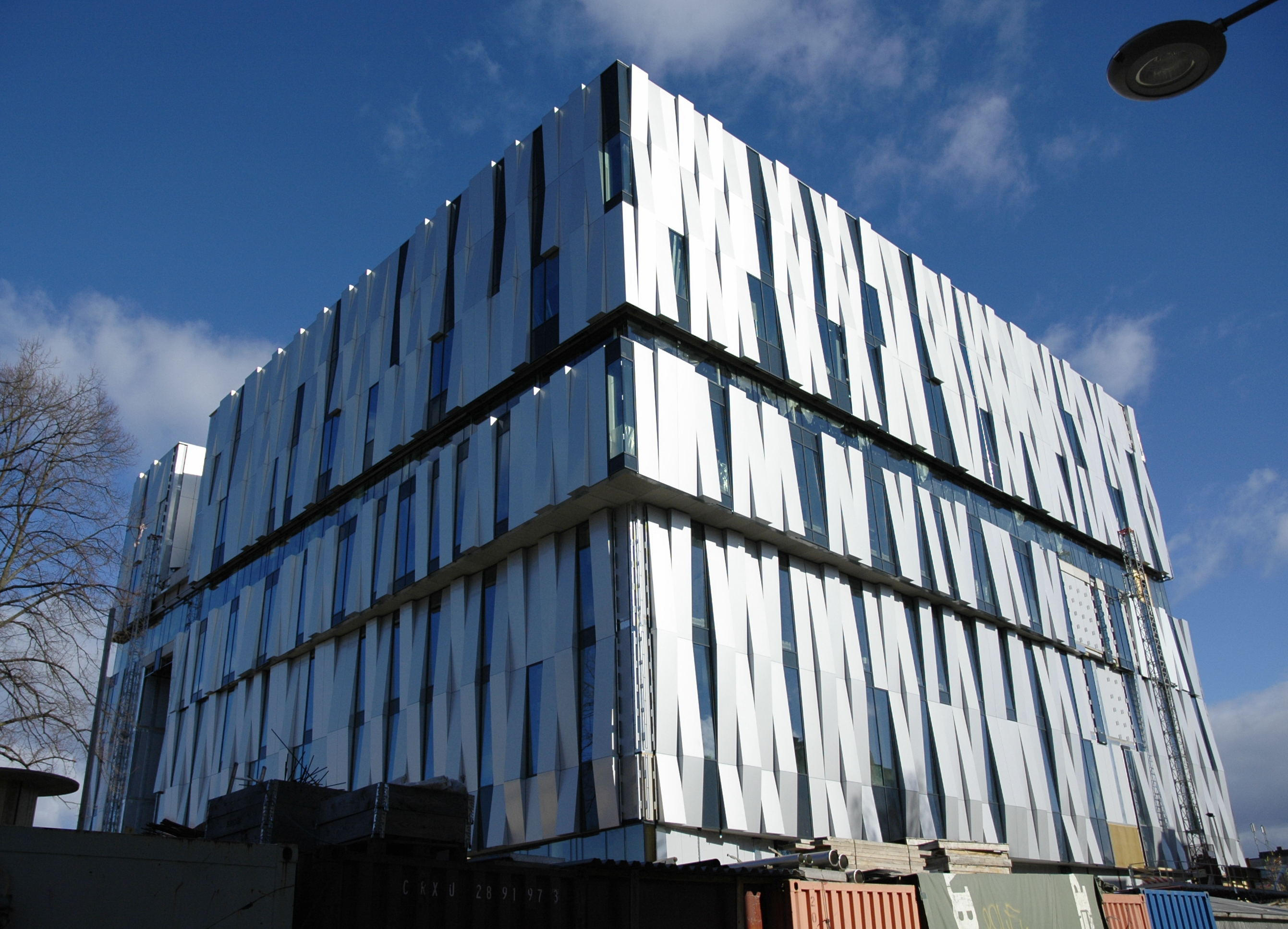
Uppsala Concert Hall, Uppsala, Sweden

=== Culture ===
- Ny Carlsberg Glyptotek French Wing, Copenhagen, Denmark (1997)
- Copenhagen Opera House, Copenhagen, Denmark (2004)
- Harpa – Reykjavík Concert Hall and Conference Center, Iceland (2011)
- Bildmuseet, Umeå, Sweden (2012)
- Art Pavilion, Videbæk, Denmark (2012)
- Moesgård Museum, Århus, Denmark (2013)
- National Museum Jamtli, Östersund, Sweden (2018)
- Hangzhou Yuhang Opera, Hangzhou, China (2019)

=== Government ===
- Danish Embassy in Riyadh, Saudi-Arabia (1979)
- Ministry of Foreign Affairs in Riyadh, Saudi Arabia (1984)
- Uppsala Concert and Congress Center, Uppsala, Sweden (2007)
- Viborg City Hall, Viborg, Denmark (2011)
- Egedal Town Hall and Health Centre, Egedal Kommune, Henning Larsen (2014)
- Middelfart City Hall and Town Centre, Middelfart, Danmark (2018)
- Eystur Town Hall, Norðragøta, The Faroe Island (2018)
- Minneapolis Public Service Building, Minneapolis, US (2021)

=== Education ===
- Norwegian University of Science and Technology, Trondheim, Norway (1978)
- Copenhagen Business School, Copenhagen, Denmark (1987)
- Malmö City Library, Malmö, Sweden (1999)
- Oslo University Hospital, Radiumhospitalet, Oslo, Norway (2000)
- IT University, Copenhagen, Denmark (2004)
- Arts Faculty – University of Plymouth, England (2007)
- Umeå School of Architecture, Sweden (2010)
- SDU Campus Kolding, Kolding, Denmark (2014)
- Frankfurt School of Finance and Management, Frankfurt, Germany (2017)
- French International School, Tseung Kwan O, Hong Kong (2018)
- Kiruna Town Hall, Kiruna, Sweden (2018)
- Carl H. Lindner College of Business, Cincinnati, Ohio, USA (2019)
- Queensland University of Technology, Brisbane, Queensland, Australia (2019)

=== Office ===
- Nordea Headquarters Christiansbro, Copenhagen, Denmark (2000)
- Ferring International Centre, Ørestad, Copenhagen, Denmark (2001)
- Spiegel House, Hamburg, Germany (2011)
- Microsoft Domicile, Lyngby, Denmark (2015)
- Siemens Headquarters, München, Germany (2016)
- Nordea Headquarters, Copenhagen, Denmark (2017)
- Jotun's Waterside Headquarters, Sandefjord, Norway (2019)
- Jyllands-Posten Headquarters, Aarhus, Denmark (2019)

=== Residential ===
- The Wave, Vejle, Denmark (2009)

Infrastructure

- Solrødgaard Water Treatment Plant, Hillerød, Denmark (2019)

=== Sports and leisure ===
- Hotel Alsik, Sønderborg, Denmark (2019)

=== Masterplans ===
- King Abdullah Financial District, Riyad

=== In progress ===
- Campus Aas, Aas, Norway (Completed in 2021)
- European Spallation Source, Lund, Sweden (Completed in2021)
- The Springs in Shanghai, Shanghai, China (Completed in2021)
- Gdansk Imperial Shipyard, Gdansk, Poland (Completed in 2021)
- Etobicoke Civic Center, Toronto, Canada (Completed in 2021)
- Uppsala Town Hall, Uppsala, Sweden (Completed in 2021)
- Malmø City Courthouse, Malmø, Sweden (Completed in 2021)
- Gothenburg City Gate, Göteborg, Sweden (Completed in 2021)
- Opéra Bastille, Paris, France (Completed in 2022)
- Mission Rock Building G, San Francisco, California, USA (Completed in 2022)
- East Harbour Toronto, Toronto, Canada (Completed in 2023)
- Humlestaden, Göteborg, Sweden (Completed in 2024)
- Tibble 2.0, Täby, Sweden (Completed in 2025)
- Cockle Bay Park, Sydney, Australien (Completed in 2026)
- Shenzhen Bay Super Headquarters Zone, Shenzhen, China (Completed in 2030)
- Esbjerg Bypark, Esbjerg, Denmark (Initiated 2018)
- Vejlands Kvarter, Amager, Denmark (Initiated 2019)
- Norges Arktiske Universitetsmuseum, Tromsø, Norway (Initiated 2019)
- Nørr Saint Denis, Paris, France (Initiated 2019)
- Belfast Waterside, Sirocco Works, Belfast, Northern Ireland (Initiated 2020)
- Wolfsburg Connect, Wolfsburg, Germany (Initiated 2020)
- Seoul Valley, Seoul, South Korea (Initiated 2020)

== Awards ==
- 1989 Aga Khan Award for the Ministry of Foreign Affairs in Riyadh
- 2008 RIBA Award for Roland Levinsky Building
- 2010 LEAF Award for The Wave (residential category)
- 2010 IDA International Design Award (Architectural Design of the Year category) for Batumi Aquarium
- 2011 Civic Trust Award for The Wave
- 2012 Civic Trust Award for Harpa - Reykjavik Concert Hall and Conference Centre
- 2013 Civic Trust Award for Umea Arts Campus
- 2013 Architizer A+ Award (+Light category) for Harpa - Reykjavik Concert Hall and Conference Centre
- 2013 European Union Prize for Contemporary Architecture for Harpa - Reykjavik Concert Hall and Conference Centre
- 2013 Emirates Glass Leaf Award for Harpa – Reykjavik Concert Hall and Conference Centre (Best Public Building - Culture)
- 2013 Emirates Glass Leaf Award for Campus Roskilde (Best Public Building - Education & Research)
- 2014 Civic Trust Award for Campus Roskilde
- 2015 Civic Trust Award for Mosgaard Museum
- 2015 The International Architecture Award (The Chicago Athenaeum: Museum of Architecture and Design) for Moesgaard Museum
- 2015 LEAF Award in the category Urban Design for Vinge Train Station
- 2016 Green Good Design Award (The Chicago Athenaeum: Museum of Architecture and Design and The European Centre for Architecture Art Design and Urban Studies) for SDU Campus Kolding
- 2016 LEAF Future Building Awards in the category Under Construction for Kiruna City Hall

== Exhibitions ==
- 1999 "The Architect's Studio" at Louisiana Museum of Modern Art, Humlebaek, Denmark
- 2011 "what if...?" at Utzon Center, Aalborg, Denmark. The exhibition has also been displayed in Umeå, Munich and at Danish Architecture Centre as a part of the exhibition "In Dialogue with the World". Archived from the original on 2013-12-24.

== See also ==
- Architecture of Denmark
- List of Danish architectural firms
