= Piiroinen =

Piiroinen is a Finnish surname. Notable people with the surname include:

- Petja Piiroinen (born 1991), Finnish snowboarder
- Peetu Piiroinen (born 1988), Finnish snowboarder

== Similar names ==
- Piironen
- Piirainen
