= Xavier Vilalta =

Spanish architect and professor (born 1980)

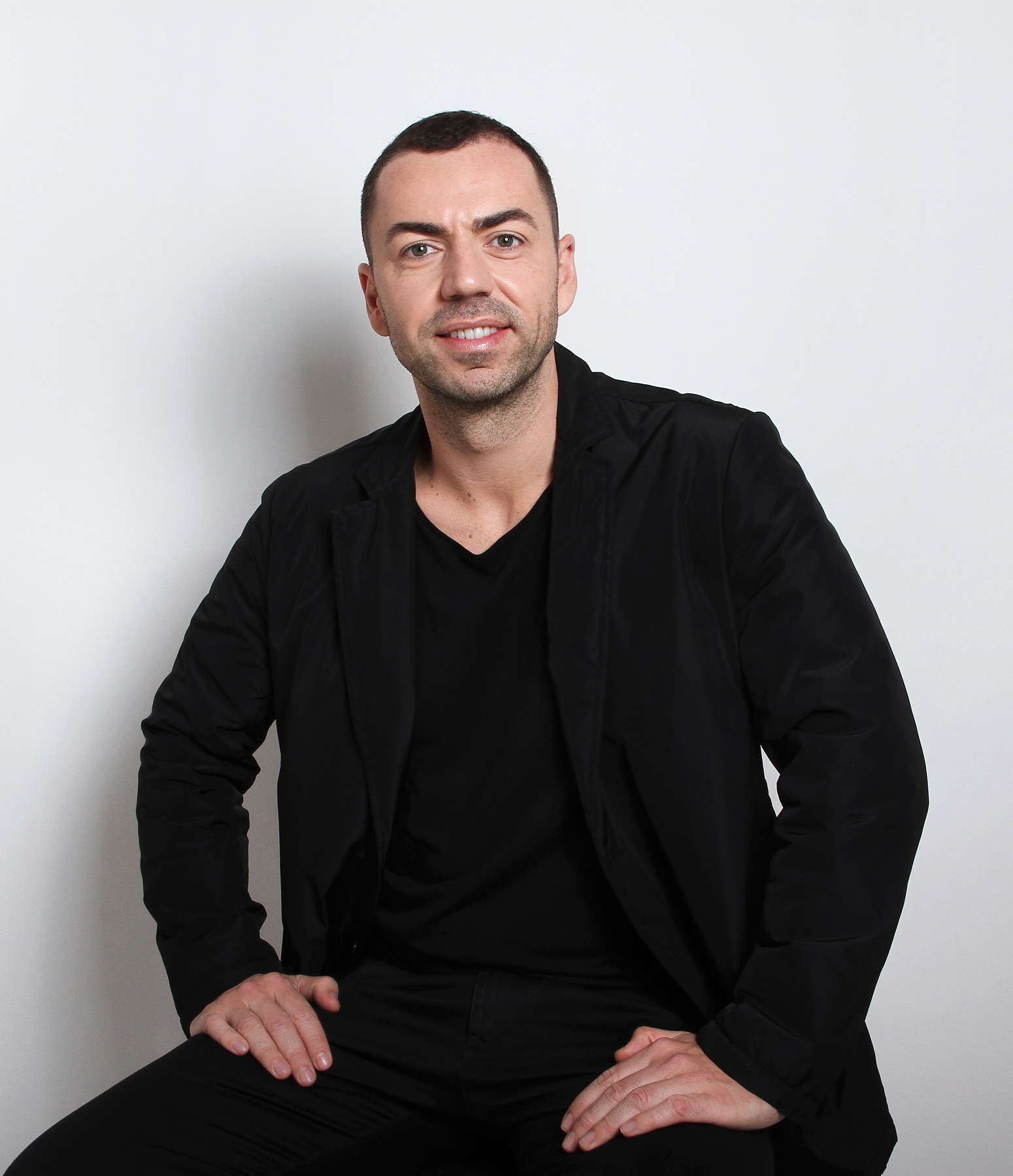
- Xavier Vilalta in 2017
- Born: May 8, 1980 (age 45); Mollerussa, Lleida, Spain
- Occupation: Architect

Xavier Vilalta (born May 8, 1980) is a Spanish architect and professor. He studied architecture in Barcelona, London, and the Illinois Institute of Technology in Chicago.

Vilalta combines practice with teaching and lecturing in cultural institutions and venues. He has taught as a professor at Barcelona Tech ETSAB and the University of Lleida.

In 2006 he founded the design firm Vilalta Studio in Barcelona, Spain. With his team, Vilalta developed his early work in Spain followed by international projects in emerging countries in Africa and the Middle East.

His projects have been recognized by international awards such as the Young Architect of the year at the Leaf Awards 2008, and two consecutive awards, 2009 and 2010, the SAIE Selection of the energy exhibition of Bologna in Italy for the sustainability of his projects. In 2011, he became a Fellow of TED (Technology, Entertainment, Design).

== Design vision ==
Vilalta's work focuses on nature and people as well as how to reconnect the two, thinking about our contemporary urban life as part of the environment where architecture grows from the local natural conditions and traditions.

He is interested in vernacular architecture related to sustainability. He defines sustainability as the relationship between architecture and the program it contains and its social values, the way it is designed and built and how it will perform in the future.

== Awards ==
Recognitions

- 2007 - Selected building for the Lleida Architecture Awards 2005-2007: Municipal Kindergarten in Mollerussa, Spain
- 2008 - 1st prize : Leaf Awards 2008 for Arreletes Day-Care Centre, Els Alamús, Lleida, Spain in the category of young architect
- 2009 - 3r prize: International Competition: SAIE Selection 09 in BolognaFiere - 11 Urban Houses project.
- 2010 - Selected building for the Lleida Architecture Awards 2007-2009: Arreletes Day-Care Centre, Els Alamús, Lleida, Spain
- 2010 - 1st prize : International Competition: SAIE Selection 10 in BolognaFiere - Melaku Center
- 2011 - TED Fellowship 2011
- 2013 - International Cooperation Award: Woldya Maternity, Ethiopia - Catalan Architects Association - COAC
- 2013 - Honorable Mention - MA Prize 13 - Modern Atlanta
- 2016 - Archdaily 1 of 10 Best Architecture projects of 2016 - Lideta Mercato Shopping mall
- 2017 - Archdaily Building of the year 2017 - Shortlisted - Lideta Mercato Shopping mall
- 2017 - Prix Versailles - UNESCO - World winner - Special prize exterior design - Lideta Mercato Shopping mall Prix Versailles

Competitions

- 2004 - Finalist International Competition: La Encarnación market, square and museum in Seville, Spain.
- 2006 - 1st prize National Competition for technology innovation for residential construction: 44 dwellings for young people in Sant Vicenç dels Horts, Barcelona, Spain.
- 2006 - 1st prize: Competition Municipal Kindergarten in Mollerussa, Spain
- 2008 - 2nd prize competition: “Onze de Setembre” Primary Care Center in Lleida, Spain
- 2010 - 1st prize: International Restricted Competition: Alpha Project, Doha, Qatar
- 2010 - Shortlisted: International Competition for New Angola University
- 2010 - 1st prize: Competition for New Lideta Shopping Center in Ethiopia
- 2012 - 2nd prize: Competition for the new United Bank Headquarters in Ethiopia

== Main projects ==
- Arreletes Day Care Center - Spain
- El Niu Kindergarten - Spain
- Pla d'Urgell Morgue - Spain
- Pro House - Spain
- Melaku Center - Ethiopia
- Alpha Project - Qatar
- Central Highlands University - Angola
- Lideta Mercato - Ethiopia
- Barcelona Ecological Center - Spain
- Ayertena Mall - Ethiopia
- Urban Gardens - Qatar
- Woldya Maternity - Ethiopia
- Cite de Mongamu - DR of the Congo

== Articles ==
- From Bullfighting to Eco-Leisure: Spain's Big Shift
- A city should look into itself before it’s too late
- (in Spanish) Plaza de toros Monumental de Barcelona (Future of Monumental Plaza in Barcelona)
- Three creative ideas to light up the world
