= Discovery of the neutron =

Scientific background leading to the discovery of subatomic particles

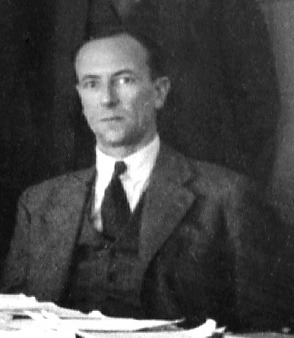
James Chadwick at the 1933 Solvay Conference. Chadwick had discovered the neutron the year before while working at Cavendish Laboratory.

The discovery of the neutron and its properties was central to the extraordinary developments in atomic physics in the first half of the 20th century. Early in the century, Ernest Rutherford used alpha particle scattering to discover that an atom has its mass and electric charge concentrated in a tiny nucleus. By 1920, isotopes of chemical elements had been discovered, the atomic masses had been determined to be approximately integer multiples of the mass of the hydrogen atom, and the atomic number had been identified as the charge on the nucleus. Throughout the 1920s, the nucleus was viewed as composed of combinations of protons and electrons, the two elementary particles known at the time, but that model presented several experimental and theoretical contradictions.

The essential nature of the atomic nucleus was established with the discovery of the neutron by James Chadwick in 1932 and the determination that it was a new elementary particle, distinct from the proton.

The uncharged neutron was immediately exploited as a new means to probe nuclear structure, leading to such discoveries as the creation of new radioactive elements by neutron irradiation (1934) and the fission of uranium atoms by neutrons (1938). The discovery of fission led to the creation of both nuclear power and nuclear weapons by the end of World War II. Both the proton and the neutron were presumed to be elementary particles until the 1960s, when they were determined to be composite particles built from quarks.

== Discovery of radioactivity ==
At the start of the 20th century, the vigorous debate as to the existence of atoms had not yet been resolved. Philosophers such as Ernst Mach and Wilhelm Ostwald denied the existence of atoms, viewing them as a convenient mathematical construct, while scientists such as Arnold Sommerfeld and Ludwig Boltzmann saw that physical theories required the existence of atoms.

Radioactivity was discovered in 1896 by the French scientist Henri Becquerel, while working with phosphorescent materials. In 1898, Ernest Rutherford at Cavendish Laboratory distinguished two types of radioactivity, alpha rays and beta rays, which differed in their ability to penetrate, or travel into, ordinary objects or gases. Two years later, Paul Villard discovered gamma rays, which possessed even more penetrating power. These radiations were later identified with known particles: beta rays were shown to be electrons by Walter Kaufmann in 1902, alpha rays were shown to be helium ions by Rutherford and Thomas Royds in 1907, and gamma rays were shown to be electromagnetic radiation, that is, a form of light, by Rutherford and Edward Andrade in 1914. These radiations had also been identified as emanating from atoms, hence they provided clues to processes occurring within atoms. Conversely, the radiations were also recognized as tools that could be used in scattering experiments to probe the interior of atoms.

== Gold foil experiment and the discovery of the atomic nucleus ==
A schematic of the nucleus of an atom indicating β^{−} radiation, the emission of a fast electron from the nucleus (the accompanying antineutrino is omitted). The inset shows beta decay of a free neutron as it is understood today; an electron and antineutrino are created in this process.

At the University of Manchester between 1908 and 1913, Rutherford directed Hans Geiger and Ernest Marsden in a series of experiments to determine what occurs when alpha particles scatter from metal foil. Now called the Rutherford gold foil experiment, or the Geiger–Marsden experiment, these measurements made the extraordinary discovery that although most alpha particles passing through a thin gold foil experienced little deflection, a few scattered to a high angle. The scattering indicated that some of the alpha particles ricocheted back from a small, but dense, component inside the atoms. Based on these measurements, it was apparent to Rutherford by 1911 that the atom consisted of a small, massive nucleus with positive charge. The concentrated atomic mass was required to provide the observed deflection of the alpha particles, and Rutherford developed a mathematical model that accounted for the scattering.

While the Rutherford model was largely ignored at the time, when Niels Bohr joined Rutherford's group, he developed the Bohr model for electrons orbiting the nucleus in 1913. The Bohr model eventually led to an atomic model based on quantum mechanics by the mid-1920s.

== Discovery of isotopes ==
Concurrent with the work of Rutherford, Geiger, and Marsden, the radiochemist Frederick Soddy at the University of Glasgow was studying chemistry-related problems on radioactive materials. Soddy had worked with Rutherford on radioactivity at McGill University. By 1910, about 40 different radioactive elements, referred to as radioelements, had been identified between uranium and lead, although the periodic table only allowed for 11 elements. Every attempt to chemically isolate the radioelements mesothorium or thorium X from radium failed. Soddy concluded that these element were chemically the same element. At the suggestion of Margaret Todd, Soddy called these chemically identical elements isotopes. In 1913, Soddy and theorist Kazimierz Fajans independently found the displacement law, that an element undergoing alpha decay will produce an element two places to the left in the periodic system and an element undergoing beta decay will produce an element one place to the right in the periodic system. For his study of radioactivity and the discovery of isotopes, Soddy was awarded the 1921 Nobel Prize in Chemistry.

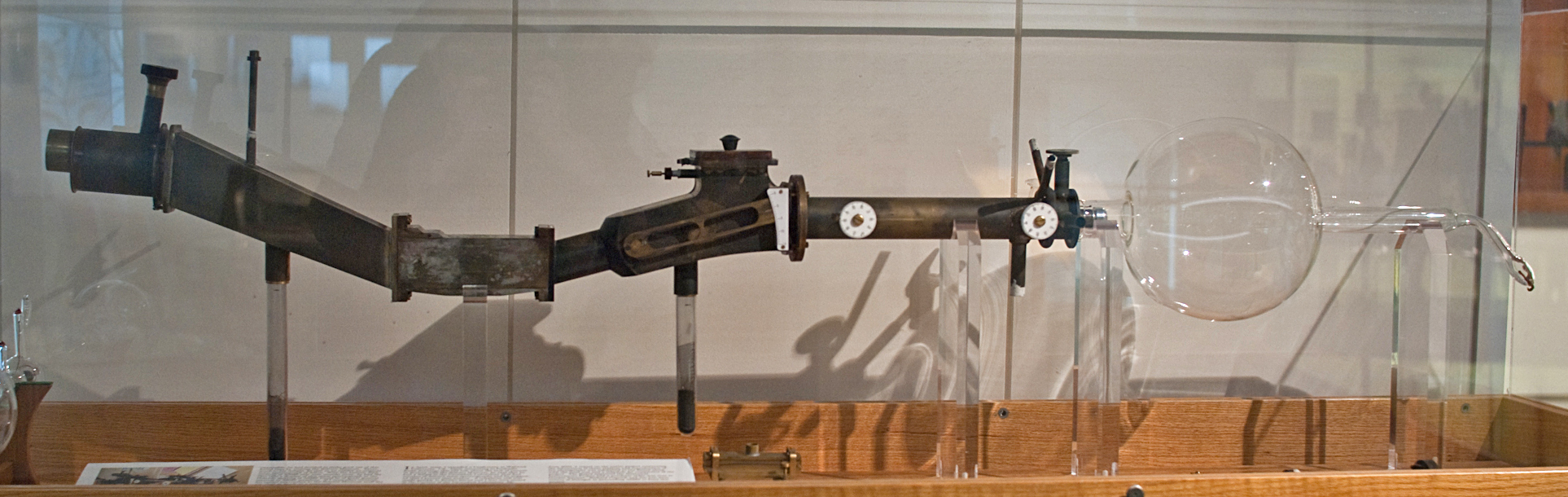
Replica of Aston's third mass spectrometer

Prior to 1919 only atomic weights averaged over a very large number of atoms was available. In that year, Francis Aston built the first mass spectrograph, an improved form of a device built by J. J. Thomson to measure the deflection of positively charged atoms by electric and magnetic fields. Aston was then able to separate the isotopes of many light elements including neon, ^{20}Ne and ^{22}Ne. Aston discovered the isotopes matched William Prout's whole number rule: the mass of every isotope is a whole number multiple of hydrogen.

Significantly, the one exception to this whole number rule was hydrogen itself, which had a mass value of 1.008. The excess mass was small, but well outside the limits of experimental uncertainty. Aston and others realized this difference was due to the binding energy of nucleons. When a number of nucleons are bound into a atom's nucleus, that atom's energy must be less than the sum of the energies of the separate nucleons. That lost energy, according to the mass-energy equivalence principle, means the atomic mass will be slightly less than the sum of the masses of its components. Aston's work on isotopes won him the 1922 Nobel Prize in Chemistry for the discovery of isotopes in a large number of non-radioactive elements, and for his enunciation of the whole number rule.

== Atomic number and Moseley's law ==
Before 1913, chemists adhered to Mendeleev's principle that chemical properties derived from atomic weight. However, several places in the periodic table were inconsistent with this concept. For example cobalt and nickel seemed reversed. There were also attempts to understand the relationship between the atomic mass and nuclear charge. Rutherford knew from experiments in his lab that helium must have a nuclear charge of 2 and a mass of 4; this 1:2 ratio was expected to hold for all elements. In 1913 Antonius van den Broek hypothesized that the periodic table should be organized by charge, denoted by Z, not atomic mass and that Z was not exactly half of the atomic weight for elements. This solved the cobalt-nickel issue. Placing cobalt (Z=27, mass of 58.97), before the less heavy nickel (Z=28, mass of 58.68) gave the ordering expected by chemical behavior.

Henry Moseley set out to test Broek's hypothesis by measuring the electromagnetic emission spectra of heavier elements, such as cobalt and nickel, to see if they followed the ordering by weight or by atomic number. In 1913–1914 Moseley tested the question experimentally by using X-ray spectroscopy. He found that the most intense short-wavelength line in the X-ray spectrum of a particular element, known as the K-alpha line, was related to the element's position in the periodic table, that is, its atomic number, Z. Moseley found that the frequencies of the radiation were related in a simple way to the atomic number of the elements for a large number of elements.

Within a year, it was noted that the equation for the relation, now called Moseley's law, could be explained in terms of the 1913 Bohr model with reasonable extra assumptions about atomic structure in other elements. Moseley's result, by Bohr's later account, not only established atomic number as a measurable experimental quantity, but gave it a physical meaning as the positive charge on the atomic nucleus. The elements could be ordered in the periodic system in order of atomic number, rather than atomic weight. The result tied together the organization of the periodic table, the Bohr model for the atom, and Rutherford's model for alpha scattering from nuclei. It was cited by Rutherford, Bohr, and others as a critical advance in understanding the nature of the atomic nucleus.

Further research in atomic physics was interrupted by the onset of World War I. Moseley was killed in 1915 at the Battle of Gallipoli, while Rutherford's student James Chadwick was interned in Germany for the duration of the war, 1914–1918. In Berlin, Lise Meitner's and Otto Hahn's research work on determining the radioactive decay chains of radium and uranium by precise chemical separation was interrupted. Meitner spent much of the war working as a radiologist and medical X-ray technician near the Austrian front, while Hahn, a chemist, worked on research in poison gas warfare.

== Rutherford's conjecture ==
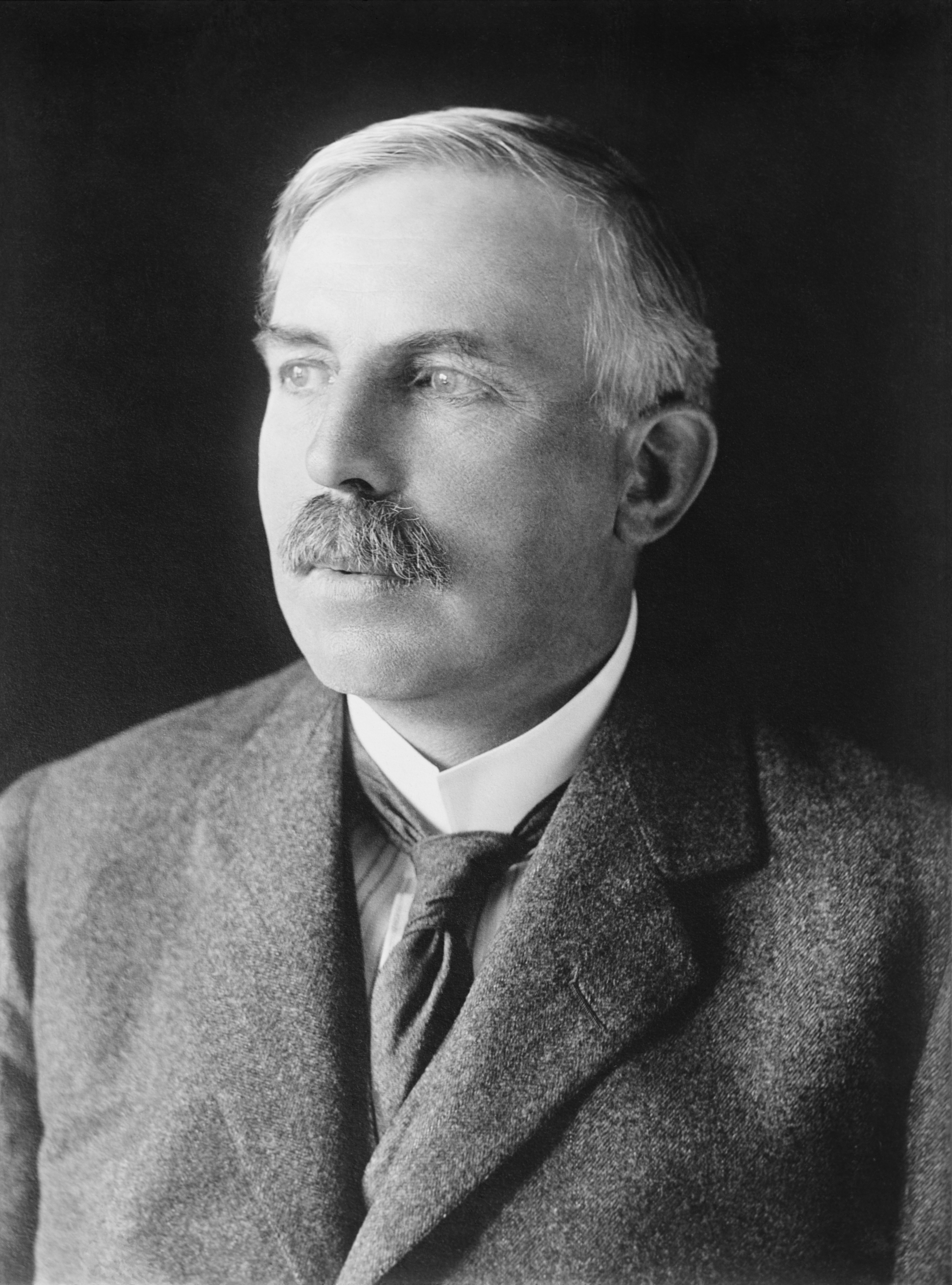
Ernest Rutherford

In 1920, Rutherford gave a Bakerian lecture at the Royal Society entitled the "Nuclear Constitution of Atoms", a summary of recent experiments on atomic nuclei and conclusions as to the structure of atomic nuclei. By 1920, the existence of electrons within the atomic nucleus was widely assumed. It was assumed the nucleus consisted of hydrogen nuclei in number equal to the atomic mass number. But, since each hydrogen nucleus had charge +1 e, the nucleus required a smaller number of "internal electrons" each of charge −1 e to give the nucleus its correct total charge. The mass of protons is about 1800 times greater than that of electrons, so the mass of the electrons is incidental in this computation. Such a model was consistent with the scattering of alpha particles from heavy nuclei, as well as the charge and mass of the many isotopes that had been identified. There were other motivations for the proton-electron model. As noted by Rutherford at the time, "We have strong reason for believing that the nuclei of atoms contain electrons as well as positively charged bodies ...", namely, it was known that beta radiation was electrons emitted from the nucleus.

In that lecture, Rutherford conjectured the existence of new particles. The alpha particle was known to be very stable, and it was assumed to retain its identity within the nucleus. The alpha particle was presumed to consist of four protons and two closely bound electrons to give it +2 charge and mass 4. In a 1919 paper, Rutherford had reported the apparent discovery of a new doubly charged particle of mass 3, denoted the X++, interpreted to consist of three protons and a closely bound electron. This result suggested to Rutherford the likely existence of two new particles: one of two protons with a closely bound electron, and another of one proton and a closely bound electron. The X++ particle was later determined to have mass 4 and to be just a low-energy alpha particle. Nevertheless, Rutherford had conjectured the existence of the deuteron, a +1 charge particle of mass 2, and the neutron, a neutral particle of mass 1. The former is the nucleus of deuterium, discovered in 1931 by Harold Urey. The mass of the hypothetical neutral particle would be little different from that of the proton. Rutherford determined that such a zero-charge particle would be difficult to detect by available techniques.

Around the time of Rutherford's lecture, other publications appeared with similar suggestions of a proton–electron composite in the nucleus, and in 1921, William Harkins, an American chemist, named the uncharged particle the neutron. About that same time the word proton was adopted for the hydrogen nucleus. Neutron was apparently constructed from the Latin root for neutral and the Greek ending -on (by imitation of electron and proton). References to the word neutron in connection with the atom can be found in the literature as early as 1899, however.

Rutherford and Chadwick immediately began an experimental program at the Cavendish Laboratory in Cambridge to search for the neutron. The experiments continued throughout the 1920s without success.

Rutherford's conjecture and the hypothetical "neutron" were not widely accepted. In his 1931 monograph on the Constitution of Atomic Nuclei and Radioactivity, George Gamow, then at the Institute for Theoretical Physics in Copenhagen, did not mention the neutron. At the time of their 1932 measurements in Paris that would lead to the discovery of the neutron, Irène Joliot-Curie and Frédéric Joliot were unaware of the conjecture.

== Problems of the nuclear electrons hypothesis ==
Throughout the 1920s, physicists assumed that the atomic nucleus was composed of protons and "nuclear electrons". Under this hypothesis, the nitrogen-14 (^{14}N) nucleus would be composed of 14 protons and 7 electrons, so that it would have a net charge of +7 elementary charge units and a mass of 14 atomic mass units. This nucleus would also be orbited by another 7 electrons, termed "external electrons" by Rutherford, to complete the ^{14}N atom. However problems with the hypothesis soon became apparent.

Ralph Kronig pointed out in 1926 that the observed hyperfine structure of atomic spectra was inconsistent with the proton–electron hypothesis. This structure is caused by the influence of the nucleus on the dynamics of orbiting electrons. The magnetic moments of supposed "nuclear electrons" should produce hyperfine spectral line splittings similar to the Zeeman effect, but no such effects were observed. It seemed that the magnetic moment of the electron vanished when it was within the nucleus.

While on a visit to Utrecht University in 1928, Kronig learned of a surprising aspect of the rotational spectrum of N_{2}^{+}. The precision measurement made by Leonard Ornstein, the director of Utrecht's Physical Laboratory, showed that the spin of a nitrogen nucleus must be equal to one. However, if the nitrogen-14 (^{14}N) nucleus was composed of 14 protons and 7 electrons, an odd number of spin-1/2 particles, then the resultant nuclear spin should be half-integer. Kronig therefore suggested the possibility that "protons and electrons do not retain their identity to the extent they do outside the nucleus".

Observations of the rotational energy levels of diatomic molecules using Raman spectroscopy by Franco Rasetti in 1929 were inconsistent with the statistics expected from the proton–electron hypothesis. Rasetti obtained band spectra for H_{2} and N_{2} molecules. While the lines for both diatomic molecules showed alternation in intensity between light and dark, the pattern of alternation for H_{2} is opposite to that of the N_{2}. After carefully analyzing these experimental results, German physicists Walter Heitler and Gerhard Herzberg showed that the hydrogen nuclei obey Fermi statistics and the nitrogen nuclei obey Bose statistics. However, a then unpublished result of Eugene Wigner showed that a composite system with an odd number of spin-1/2 particles must obey Fermi statistics; a system with an even number of spin-1/2 particle obeys Bose statistics. If the nitrogen nucleus had 21 particles, it should obey Fermi statistics, contrary to fact. Thus, Heitler and Herzberg concluded: "the electron in the nucleus ... loses its ability to determine the statistics of the nucleus."

The Klein paradox, discovered by Oskar Klein in 1928, presented further quantum mechanical objections to the notion of an electron confined within a nucleus. Derived from the Dirac equation, this clear and precise paradox suggested that an electron approaching a high potential barrier has a high probability of passing through the barrier by a pair creation process. Apparently, an electron could not be confined within a nucleus by any potential well. The meaning of this paradox was widely debated at the time.

By about 1930, it was generally recognized that it was difficult to reconcile the proton–electron model for nuclei with the Heisenberg uncertainty relation of quantum mechanics. This relation, Δx⋅Δp ≥ 1/2ħ, implies that an electron confined to a region the size of an atomic nucleus typically has a kinetic energy of about 40 MeV, (Note: In a nucleus of radius r in the order of 5×10^{−13}cm, the uncertainty principle would require an electron to have a momentum p of the order of h/r. Such a momentum implies that the electron has a (relativistic) kinetic energy of about 40MeV.) which is larger than the observed energy of beta particles emitted from the nucleus. Such energy is also much larger than the binding energy of nucleons, which Aston and others had shown to be less than 9 MeV per nucleon.

In 1927, Charles Ellis and W. Wooster at the Cavendish Laboratory measured the energies of β-decay electrons. They found that the distribution of energies from any particular radioactive nuclei was broad and continuous, a result that contrasted notably with the distinct energy values observed in alpha and gamma decay. Furthermore, the continuous energy distribution seemed to indicate that energy was not conserved by this "nuclear electrons" process. In 1929, Bohr proposed to modify the law of energy conservation to account for the continuous energy distribution, a proposal that earned the support of Werner Heisenberg. Such considerations were apparently reasonable, inasmuch as the laws of quantum mechanics had so recently overturned the laws of classical mechanics.

While all of these considerations did not "prove" an electron could not exist in the nucleus, they were confusing and challenging for physicists to interpret. Many theories were invented to explain how the above arguments could be wrong. In his 1931 monograph, Gamow summarized all of these contradictions, marking the statements regarding electrons in the nucleus with warning symbols.

== Discovery of the neutron ==
In 1930, Walther Bothe and his collaborator Herbert Becker in Giessen, Germany found that if the energetic alpha particles emitted from polonium fell on certain light elements, specifically beryllium (^{9}_{4}Be), boron (^{11}_{5}B), or lithium (^{7}_{3}Li), an unusually penetrating radiation was produced. Beryllium produced the most intense radiation. Polonium is highly radioactive, producing energetic alpha radiation, and it was commonly used for scattering experiments at the time. Alpha radiation can be influenced by an electric field because it is composed of charged particles. The observed penetrating radiation was not influenced by an electric field, however, so it was thought to be gamma radiation. The radiation was more penetrating than any gamma rays known, and the details of experimental results were difficult to interpret.

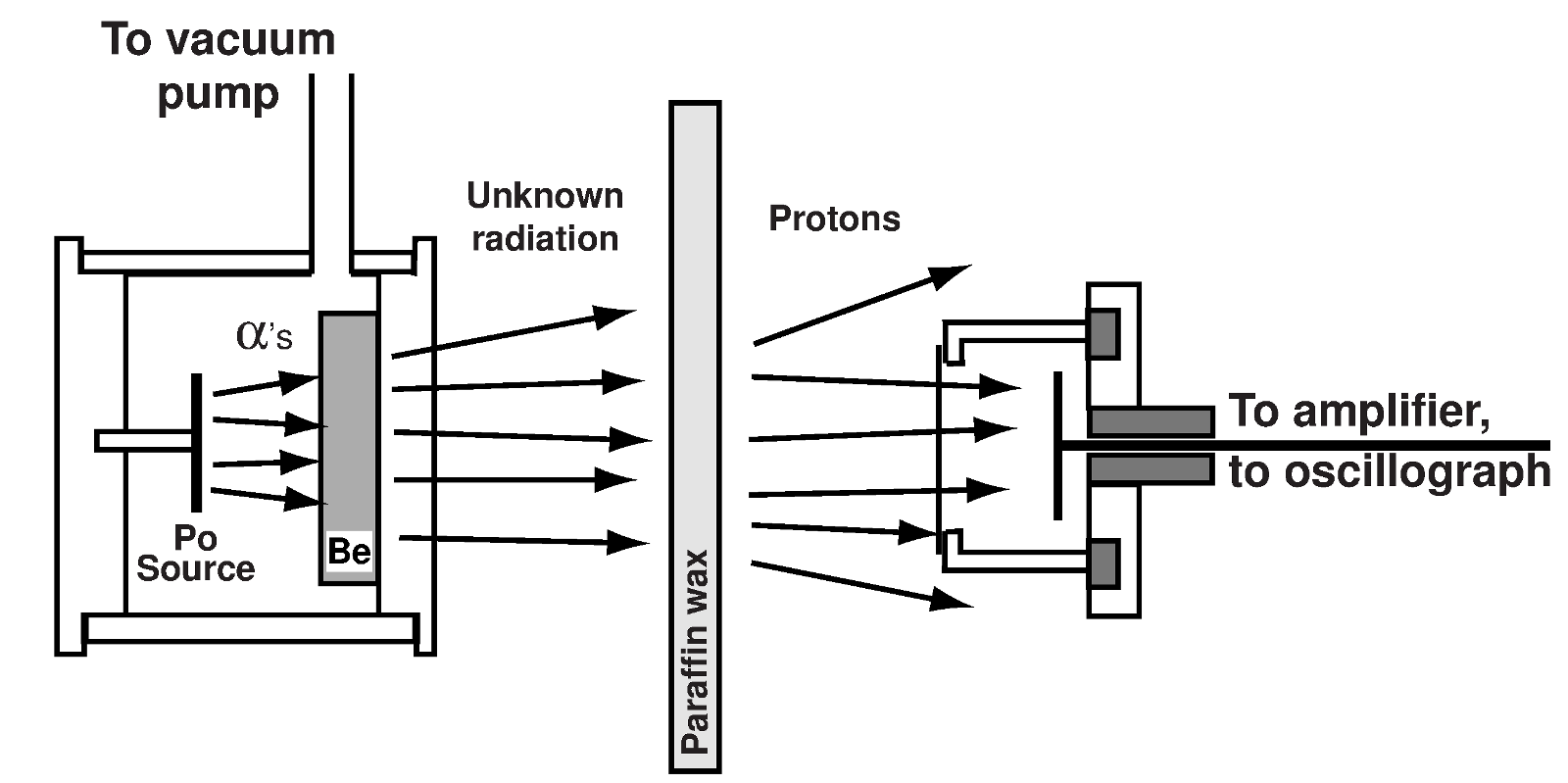
A schematic diagram of the experiment used to discover the neutron in 1932. At left, a polonium source was used to irradiate beryllium with alpha particles, which induced an uncharged radiation. When this radiation struck paraffin wax, protons were ejected. The protons were observed using a small ionization chamber. Adapted from Chadwick (1932).

Two years later, Irène Joliot-Curie and Frédéric Joliot in Paris showed that if this unknown radiation fell on paraffin wax, or any other hydrogen-containing compound, it ejected protons of very high energy (5 MeV). This observation was not in itself inconsistent with the assumed gamma ray nature of the new radiation, but that interpretation (Compton scattering) had a logical problem. From energy and momentum considerations, a gamma ray would have to have impossibly high energy (50 MeV) to scatter a massive proton. In Rome, the young physicist Ettore Majorana declared that the manner in which the new radiation interacted with protons required a neutral particle as heavy as a proton, but declined to publish his result despite the encouragement of Enrico Fermi.

On hearing of the Paris results, Rutherford and James Chadwick at the Cavendish Laboratory also did not believe the gamma ray hypothesis since it failed to conserve energy. Assisted by Norman Feather, Chadwick quickly performed a series of experiments showing that the gamma ray hypothesis was untenable. The previous year, Chadwick, J.E.R. Constable, and E.C. Pollard had already conducted experiments on disintegrating light elements using alpha radiation from polonium. They had also developed more accurate and efficient methods for detecting, counting, and recording the ejected protons. Chadwick repeated the creation of the radiation using beryllium to absorb the alpha particles: ^{9}Be + ^{4}He (α) → ^{12}C + ^{1}n. Following the Paris experiment, he aimed the radiation at paraffin wax, a hydrocarbon high in hydrogen content, hence offering a target dense with protons. As in the Paris experiment, the radiation energetically scattered some of the protons. Chadwick measured the range of these protons and also measured how the new radiation impacted the atoms of various gases. Measurements of the recoil energy showed that the mass of the radiation particles must be similar to the mass of the proton: the new radiation could not consist of gamma rays. Uncharged particles with about the same mass to the proton matched the properties Rutherford described in 1920 and which had later been called neutrons. Chadwick won the Nobel Prize in Physics in 1935 for this discovery.

The year 1932 was later referred to as the "annus mirabilis" for nuclear physics in the Cavendish Laboratory, with discoveries of the neutron, artificial nuclear disintegration by the Cockcroft–Walton particle accelerator, and the positron.

== Proton–neutron model of the nucleus ==
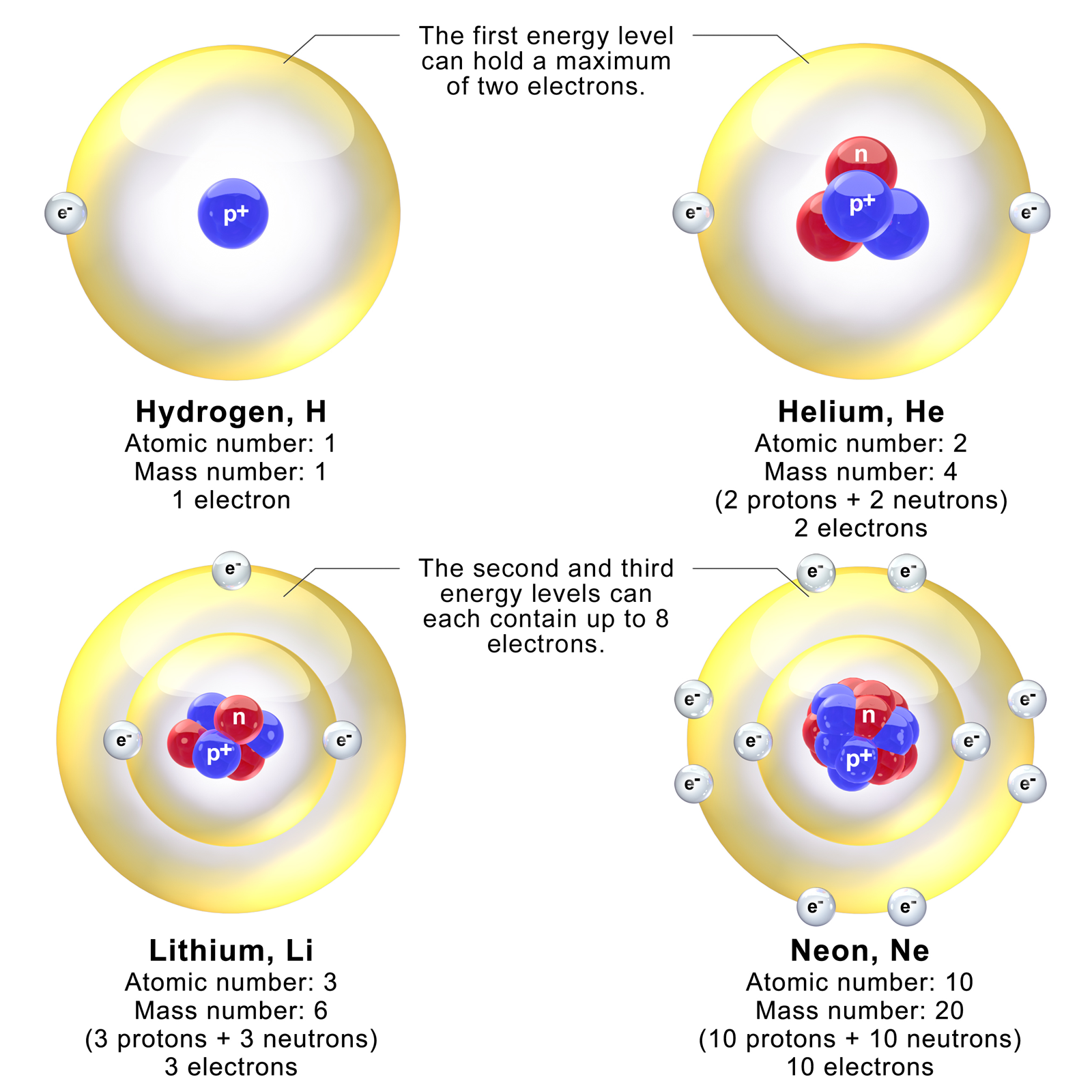
Models depicting the nucleus and electron energy levels in hydrogen, helium, lithium, and neon atoms. In reality, the diameter of the nucleus is about 100,000 times smaller than the diameter of the atom.

Given the problems of the proton–electron model, it was quickly accepted that the atomic nucleus is composed of protons and neutrons, although the precise nature of the neutron was initially unclear. Within months after the discovery of the neutron, Werner Heisenberg and Dmitri Ivanenko had proposed proton–neutron models for the nucleus. Heisenberg's landmark papers approached the description of protons and neutrons in the nucleus through quantum mechanics. While Heisenberg's theory for protons and neutrons in the nucleus was a "major step toward understanding the nucleus as a quantum mechanical system", he still assumed the presence of nuclear electrons. In particular, Heisenberg assumed the neutron was a proton–electron composite, for which there is no quantum mechanical explanation. Heisenberg had no explanation for how lightweight electrons could be bound within the nucleus. Heisenberg introduced the first theory of nuclear exchange forces that bind the nucleons. He considered protons and neutrons to be different quantum states of the same particle, i.e., nucleons distinguished by the value of their nuclear isospin quantum numbers.

The proton–neutron model explained the puzzle of dinitrogen. When ^{14}N was proposed to consist of 3 pairs each of protons and neutrons, with an additional unpaired neutron and proton each contributing a spin of 1/2 ħ in the same direction for a total spin of 1 ħ, the model became viable. Soon, neutrons were used to naturally explain spin differences in many different nuclides in the same way.

If the proton–neutron model for the nucleus resolved many issues, it highlighted the problem of explaining the origins of beta radiation. No existing theory at the time could account for how electrons or positrons could emanate from the nucleus. In 1934, Enrico Fermi published his classic paper describing the process of beta decay, in which the neutron decays to a proton by creating an electron and a (as yet undiscovered) neutrino. The paper employed the analogy that photons, or electromagnetic radiation, were similarly created and destroyed in atomic processes. Ivanenko had suggested a similar analogy in 1932. Fermi's theory requires the neutron to be a spin-1/2 particle. The theory preserved the principle of conservation of energy, which had been put into question by the continuous energy distribution of beta particles. The basic theory for beta decay proposed by Fermi was the first to show how particles could be created and destroyed. It established a general, basic theory for the interaction of particles by weak or strong forces. While this influential paper has stood the test of time, the ideas within it were so new that when it was first submitted to the journal Nature in 1933 it was rejected as being too speculative.

== Nature of the neutron ==
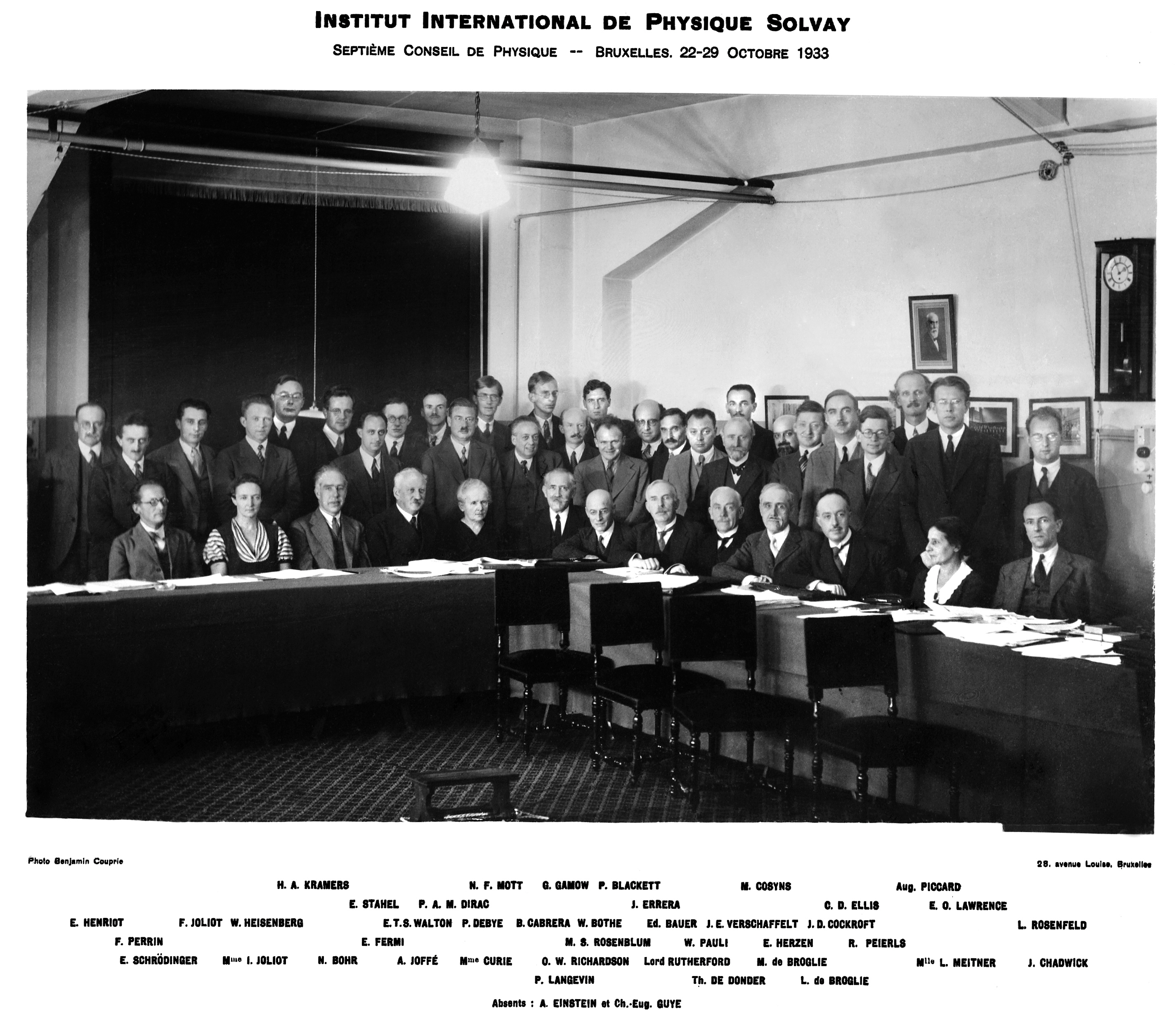
Seventh Solvay Conference, 1933.

The question of whether the neutron was a composite particle of a proton and an electron persisted for a few years after its discovery. In 1932 Harrie Massey explored a model for a composite neutron to account for its great penetrating power through matter and its electrical neutrality, for example. The issue was a legacy of the prevailing view from the 1920s that the only elementary particles were the proton and electron.

The nature of the neutron was a primary topic of discussion at the 7th Solvay Conference held in October 1933, attended by Heisenberg, Niels Bohr, Lise Meitner, Ernest Lawrence, Fermi, Chadwick, and others. As posed by Chadwick in his Bakerian Lecture in 1933, the primary question was the mass of the neutron relative to the proton. If the neutron's mass was less than the combined masses of a proton and an electron (1.0078 Da), then the neutron could be a proton-electron composite because of the mass defect from the nuclear binding energy. If greater than the combined masses, then the neutron was elementary like the proton. The question was challenging to answer because the electron's mass is only 0.05% of the proton's, hence exceptionally precise measurements were required.

The difficulty of making the measurement is illustrated by the wide-ranging values for the mass of the neutron obtained from 1932 to 1934. The accepted value today is 1.00866 Da. In Chadwick's 1932 paper reporting on the discovery, he estimated the mass of the neutron to be between 1.005 Da and 1.008 Da. By bombarding boron with alpha particles, Frédéric and Irène Joliot-Curie obtained a high value of 1.012 Da, while Ernest Lawrence's team at the University of California measured the small value 1.0006 Da using their new cyclotron.

In 1935 Chadwick and his doctoral student Maurice Goldhaber resolved the issue by reporting the first accurate measurement of the mass of the neutron. They used the 2.6 MeV gamma rays of Thallium-208 (^{208}Tl) (then known as "thorium C") to photodisintegrate the deuteron.

^{2}_{1}D	+	γ	→	^{1}_{1}H	+	n

In this reaction, the resulting proton and neutron have about equal kinetic energy, since their masses are about equal. The kinetic energy of the resulting proton could be measured (0.24 MeV), and therefore the deuteron's binding energy could be determined (2.6 MeV − 2(0.24 MeV) = 2.1 MeV, or 0.0023 Da). The neutron's mass could then be determined by the simple mass balance

m_{d}	+	b.e.	=	m_{p}	+	m_{n}

where m_{d,p,n} refer to the deuteron, proton, or neutron mass, and "b.e." is the binding energy. The masses of the deuteron and proton were known; Chadwick and Goldhaber used values 2.0142 Da and 1.0081 Da, respectively. They found that the neutron's mass was slightly greater than the mass of the proton 1.0084 Da or 1.0090 Da, depending on the precise value used for the deuteron mass. The mass of the neutron was too large to be a proton–electron composite, and the neutron was therefore identified as an elementary particle. Chadwick and Goldhaber predicted that a free neutron would be able to decay into a proton, electron, and neutrino (free neutron decay).

== Neutron physics in the 1930s ==
Soon after the discovery of the neutron, indirect evidence suggested the neutron had an unexpected non-zero value for its magnetic moment. Attempts to measure the neutron's magnetic moment originated with the discovery by Otto Stern in 1933 in Hamburg that the proton had an anomalously large magnetic moment. By 1934 groups led by Stern, now in Pittsburgh, and I. I. Rabi in New York had independently deduced that the magnetic moment of the neutron was negative and unexpectedly large by measuring the magnetic moments of the proton and deuteron. Values for the magnetic moment of the neutron were also determined by Robert Bacher (1933) at Ann Arbor and I.Y. Tamm and S.A. Altshuler (1934) in the Soviet Union from studies of the hyperfine structure of atomic spectra. By the late 1930s, accurate values for the magnetic moment of the neutron had been deduced by the Rabi group, using measurements employing newly developed nuclear magnetic resonance techniques. The large value for the proton's magnetic moment and the inferred negative value for the neutron's magnetic moment were unexpected and raised many questions.

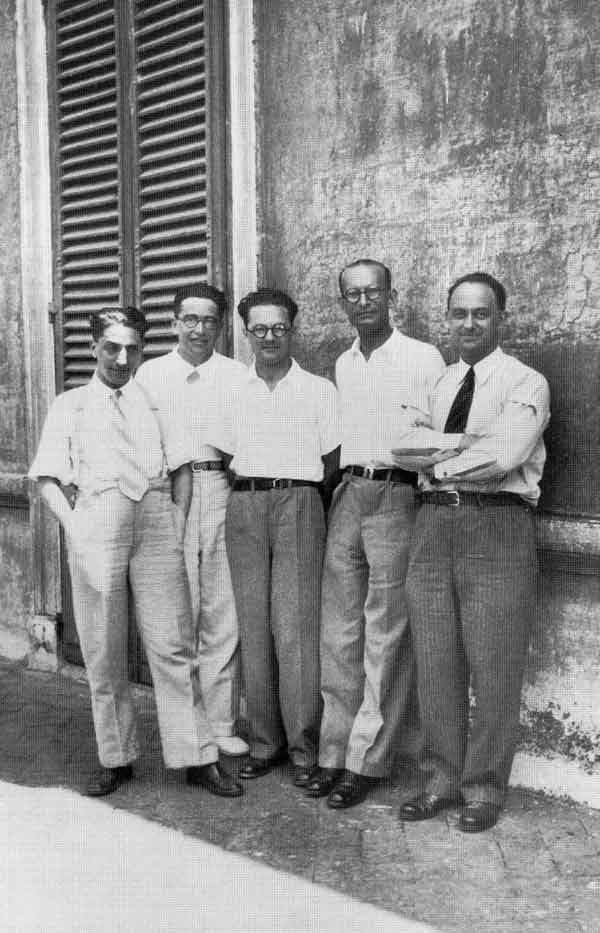
Fermi and his students (the Via Panisperna boys) in the courtyard of Rome University's Physics Institute in Via Panisperna, about 1934. From Left to right: Oscar D'Agostino, Emilio Segrè, Edoardo Amaldi, Franco Rasetti and Fermi

The discovery of the neutron immediately gave scientists a new tool for probing the properties of atomic nuclei. Alpha particles had been used over the previous decades in scattering experiments, but such particles, which are helium nuclei, have +2 charge. This charge makes it difficult for alpha particles to overcome the Coulomb repulsive force and interact directly with the nuclei of atoms. Since neutrons have no electric charge, they do not have to overcome this force to interact with nuclei. Almost coincident with their discovery, neutrons were used by Norman Feather, Chadwick's colleague and protege, in scattering experiments with nitrogen. Feather was able to demonstrate that neutrons interacting with nitrogen nuclei scattered to protons or induced nitrogen to disintegrate to form boron with the emission of an alpha particle. Feather was therefore the first to show that neutrons produce nuclear disintegrations.

In Rome, Enrico Fermi and his team bombarded heavier elements with neutrons and found the products to be radioactive. By 1934, they had used neutrons to induce radioactivity in 22 different elements, many of these elements of high atomic number. Noticing that other experiments with neutrons at his laboratory seemed to work better on a wooden table than a marble table, Fermi suspected that the protons of the wood were slowing the neutrons and so increasing the chance for the neutron to interact with nuclei. Fermi therefore passed neutrons through paraffin wax to slow them and found that the radioactivity of some bombarded elements increased by a factor of tens to hundreds. The cross section for interaction with nuclei is much larger for slow neutrons than for fast neutrons. In 1938, Fermi received the Nobel Prize in Physics "for his demonstrations of the existence of new radioactive elements produced by neutron irradiation, and for his related discovery of nuclear reactions brought about by slow neutrons". Later, Fermi recounted to Chandrasekhar that he was originally planning to put a piece of lead there, but an inexplicable, intuitive feeling made him put a paraffin in the spot instead.

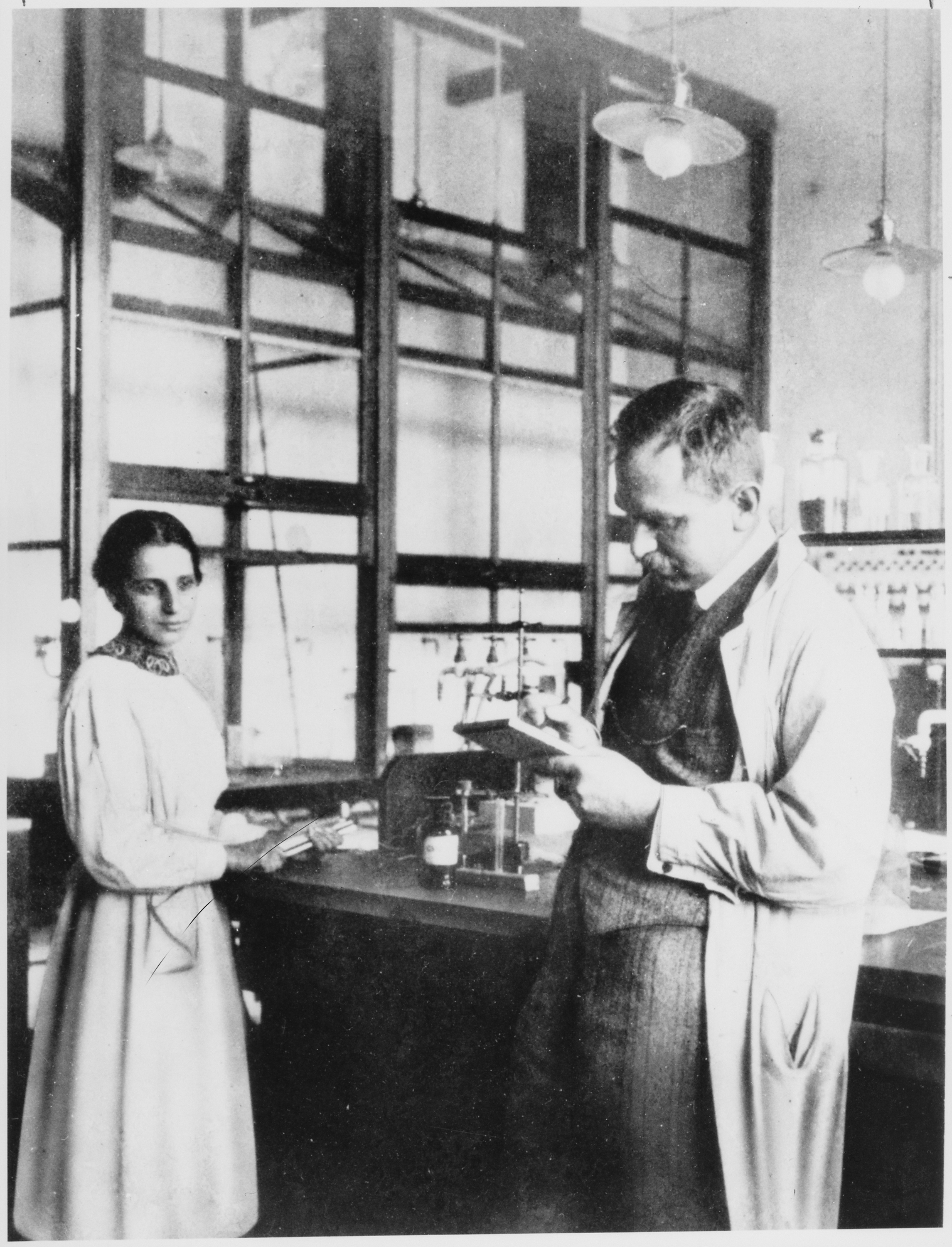
Lise Meitner and Otto Hahn in their laboratory in 1913.

Nuclear fission caused by absorption of a neutron by uranium-235. The heavy nuclide fragments into lighter components and additional neutrons.

In Berlin, the collaboration of Lise Meitner and Otto Hahn, together with their assistant Fritz Strassmann, furthered the research begun by Fermi and his team when they bombarded uranium with neutrons. Between 1934 and 1938, Hahn, Meitner, and Strassmann found a great number of radioactive transmutation products from these experiments, all of which they regarded as transuranic. Transuranic nuclides are those that have an atomic number greater than uranium (92), formed by neutron absorption; such nuclides are not naturally occurring. In July 1938, Meitner was forced to escape antisemitic persecution in Nazi Germany after the Anschluss, and she was able to secure a new position in Sweden. The decisive experiment on 16–17 December 1938 (using a chemical process called "radium–barium–mesothorium fractionation") produced puzzling results: what they had understood to be three isotopes of radium were instead consistently behaving as barium. Radium (atomic number 88) and barium (atomic number 56) are in the same chemical group. By January 1939 Hahn had concluded that what they had thought were transuranic nuclides were instead much lighter nuclides, such as barium, lanthanum, cerium and light platinoids. Meitner and her nephew Otto Frisch immediately and correctly interpreted these observations as resulting from nuclear fission, a term coined by Frisch.

Hahn and his collaborators had detected the splitting of uranium nuclei, made unstable by neutron absorption, into lighter elements. Meitner and Frisch also showed that the fission of each uranium atom would release about 200 MeV of energy. The discovery of fission electrified the global community of atomic physicists and the public. In their second publication on nuclear fission, Hahn and Strassmann predicted the existence and liberation of additional neutrons during the fission process. Frédéric Joliot and his team proved this phenomenon to be a chain reaction in March 1939. In 1945, Hahn received the 1944 Nobel Prize in Chemistry "for his discovery of the fission of heavy atomic nuclei".

== After 1939 ==
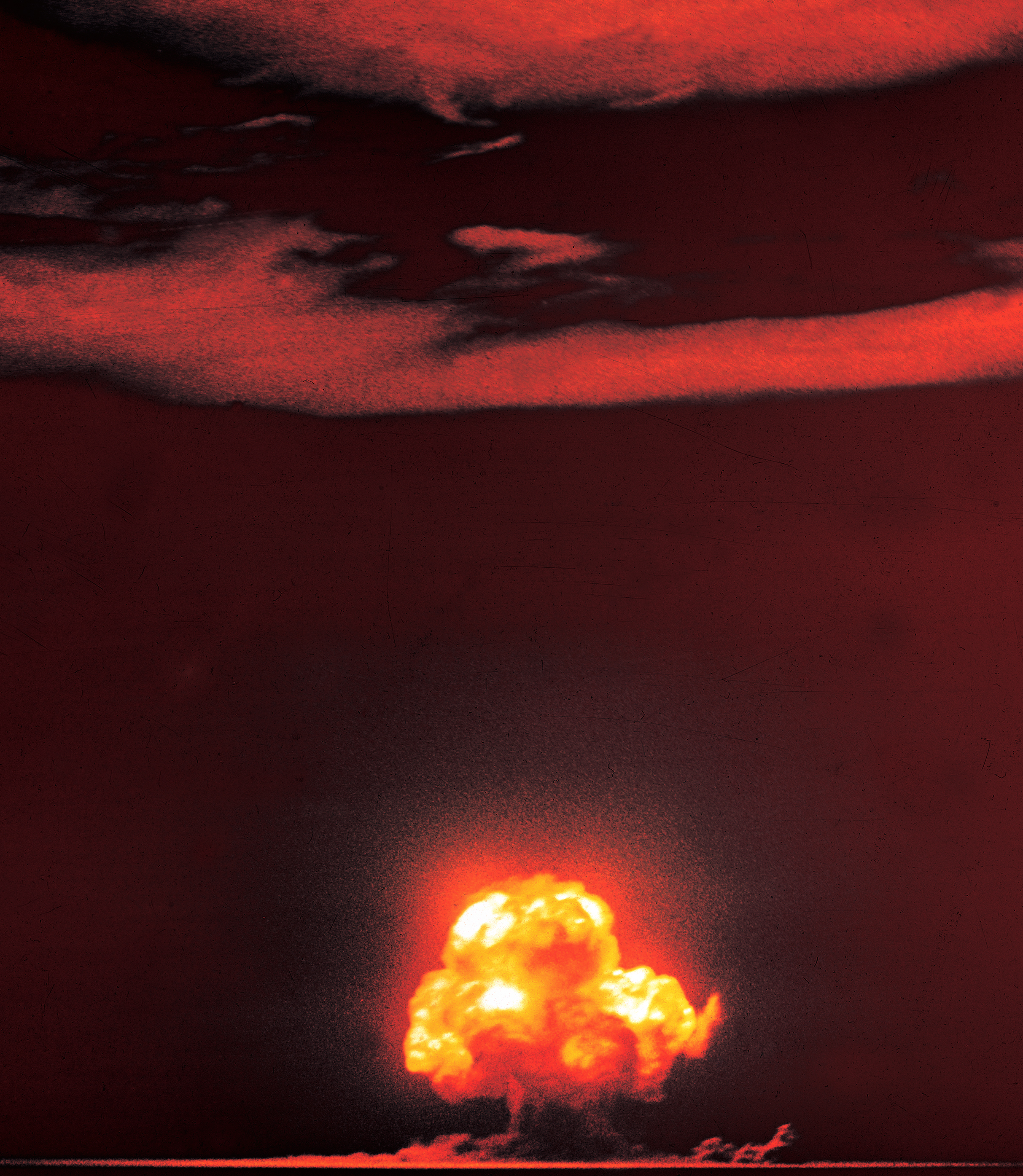
The first atomic bomb was exploded in the Manhattan Project's Trinity test, 1945.

The discovery of nuclear fission at the end of 1938 marked a shift in the centers of nuclear research from Europe to the United States. Large numbers of scientists were migrating to the United States to escape the troubles and antisemitism in Europe and the looming war (See Jewish scientists and the Manhattan Project). The new centers of nuclear research were the universities in the United States, particularly Columbia University in New York and the University of Chicago where Enrico Fermi had relocated, and a secret research facility at Los Alamos, New Mexico, established in 1942, the new home of the Manhattan Project. This wartime project was focused on the construction of nuclear weapons, using the enormous energy released by the fission of uranium or plutonium through neutron-based chain reactions.

The discoveries of the neutron and positron in 1932 were the start of the discoveries of many new particles. Muons were discovered in 1936, pions and kaons were discovered in 1947, and lambda particles were discovered in 1950. Throughout the 1950s and 1960s, a large number of particles called hadrons were discovered. A classification scheme for organizing all these particles, proposed independently by Murray Gell-Mann and George Zweig in 1964, became known as the quark model. By this model, particles such as the proton and neutron were not elementary, but composed of various configurations of a small number of other truly elementary particles called partons or quarks. The quark model received experimental verification beginning in the late 1960s and finally provided an explanation for the neutron's anomalous magnetic moment.

== Videos ==
- Ernest Rutherford summarizes the state of nuclear physics in 1935. (7 min., Nobelprize.org)
- Hans Bethe discusses Chadwick and Goldhaber's work on deuteron disintegration. (2 min., Web of Stories)
