= I ragazzi di via Panisperna =

1989 film by Gianni Amelio

- Directed by: Gianni Amelio
- Written by: Gianni Amelio; Vincenzo Cerami; Alessandro Sermoneta
- Produced by: Beta Film; Radiotelevisione Italiana; Urania Film
- Starring: Andrea Prodan; Ennio Fantastichini
- Cinematography: Marco Onorato; Tonino Nardi
- Edited by: Roberto Perpignani
- Music by: Riz Ortolani
- Distributed by: BIM Distribuzione (Italy)
- Release date: 1989
- Running time: 123 minutes
- Countries: Italy; West Germany
- Language: Italian

I ragazzi di via Panisperna (Via Panisperna Boys) is an Italian movie by director Gianni Amelio, telling the enthusiasms, fears, joys and disappointments of the (private and professional) life of a well-known group of young men fond of physics and mathematics, who just made history as the Via Panisperna boys.

The movie derives from a 3-hour long TV movie, which was produced and broadcast in two parts by RAI in 1990.

== Plot ==
The story is inspired by a real life fact and set in the 1930s when, at the Institute of Physics of Via Panisperna, in Rome, physicist Enrico Fermi managed to involve a group of brilliant young students—Emilio, Bruno, Edoardo and Ettore (all of whom became famous scientists)—forming a working group committed to scientific research who would achieve great discoveries in the field of nuclear physics.

The film explores the private side of these young men's lives, characterized by their anxieties and enthusiasms.

The story has among the main themes the relationship between Enrico and Ettore, the former becoming both a sort of father and of elder brother to Ettore, with the typical disputes (misunderstandings hiding affection) happening in a family. Unfortunately, the fascist political regime, the racial laws, Ettore's disappearance into nowhere (suspicious death or suicide, it will never be known)—he who already realized how their exciting discoveries could become powerful destruction weapons in wrong hands (attentively see the scene set in Sicilian fields)—all proves to be more decisive than the love for physics which had drawn them together so much and, finally, the boys turn different ways.

== Cast ==
- Andrea Prodan as Ettore Majorana
- Ennio Fantastichini as Enrico Fermi
- Michele Melega as Franco, assistant of Fermi
- Giovanni Romani as Edoardo Amaldi
- Alberto Gimignani as Emilio Segrè
- Giorgio Dal Piaz as Bruno Pontecorvo
- Laura Morante as Laura, wife of Fermi
- Cristina Marsillach as cousin of Majorana
- Mario Adorf as Orso Mario Corbino
- Virna Lisi as mother of Majorana
- Sabina Guzzanti as Ginestra, lover of Amaldi
- Georges Géret as Francese

== See also ==
- Via Panisperna boys, the group of young men that gathered around Enrico Fermi in real life.
- List of Italian films of 1989
- Gianni Amelio
