= Franco Rasetti =

Italian physicist

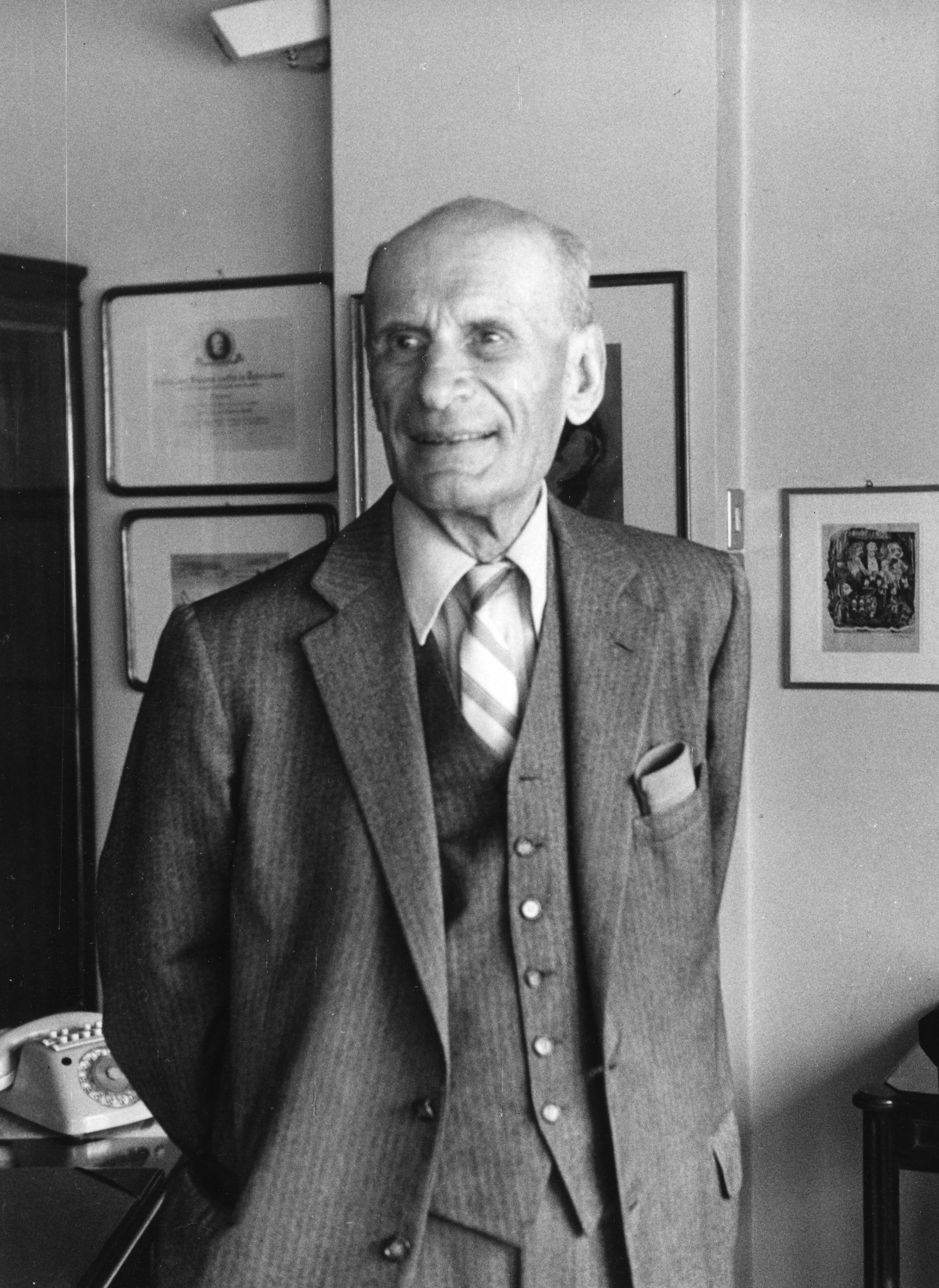
- Rasetti in 1984
- Born: August 10, 1901; Castiglione del Lago, Kingdom of Italy
- Died: December 5, 2001 (aged 100); Waremme, Belgium
- Spouse: Marie Madeline Hennin (m. 1949)

Franco Dino Rasetti (August 10, 1901 – December 5, 2001) was an Italian (later naturalized American) physicist, paleontologist and botanist. Together with Enrico Fermi, he discovered key processes leading to nuclear fission. Rasetti refused to work on the Manhattan Project on moral grounds.

== Life and career ==
Rasetti was born in Castiglione del Lago, Italy. He earned a Laurea in physics at the University of Pisa in 1923, and Fermi invited him to join his research group at the University of Rome.

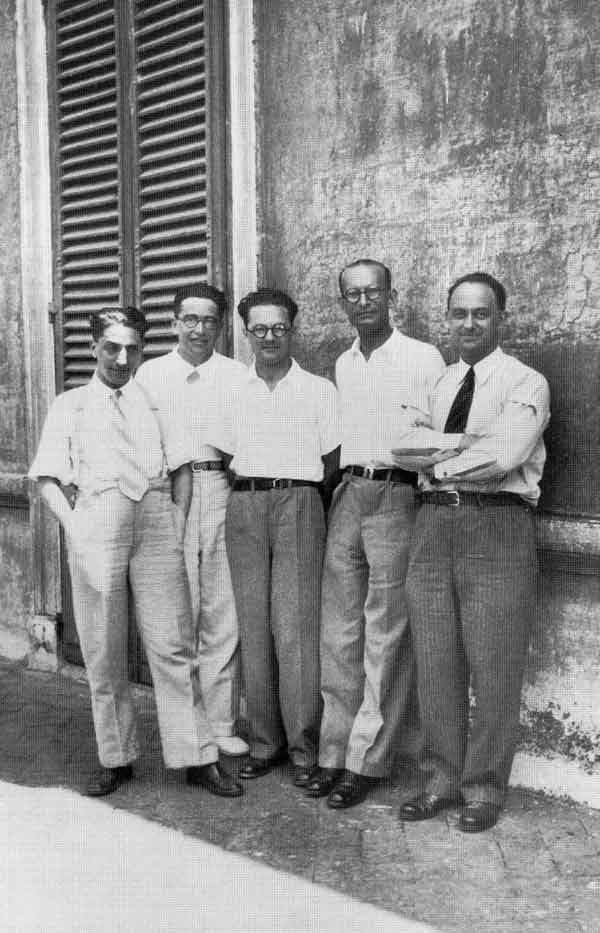
Enrico Fermi and his research group (the Via Panisperna boys) in the courtyard of Rome University's Physics Institute in Via Panisperna, about 1934. Franco Rasetti is the second from right

In 1928-1929 during a stay at the California Institute of Technology (Caltech), he carried out experiments on the Raman effect. He measured a spectrum of dinitrogen in 1929 which provided the first experimental evidence that the atomic nucleus is not composed of protons and electrons, as was incorrectly believed at the time.

In 1930, he was appointed to the chair in spectroscopy at the Physics Institute of the University of Rome, at that time still located in Via Panisperna. His colleagues included Oscar D'Agostino, Emilio Segrè, Edoardo Amaldi, Ettore Majorana and Enrico Fermi, as well as the institute's director Orso Mario Corbino. Rasetti remained in this position until 1938.

Rasetti was one of Fermi's main collaborators in the study of neutrons and neutron-induced radioactivity. In 1934, he participated in the discovery of the artificial radioactivity of fluorine and aluminium which would be critical in the development of the atomic bomb.

In 1939 the advance of fascism and the deteriorating Italian political situation led him to leave Italy, following the example of his colleagues Fermi, Segré and Bruno Pontecorvo. With Fermi he had discovered the key to nuclear fission, but unlike many of his colleagues, he refused for moral reasons to work on the Manhattan Project.

From 1939 to 1947, he taught at Laval University in Quebec City (Canada), where he was founding chairman of the physics department.

In 1947, he moved to the United States where he became a naturalized citizen in 1952. Until 1967, he held a chair in physics at Johns Hopkins University in Baltimore.

From the 1950s onward, he gradually shifted his commitment to naturalistic studies, which had been his great interest outside of physics already as a child. He devoted himself to geology, paleontology, entomology, and botany, becoming one of the most authoritative scholars of the Cambrian geological era.

He died in Waremme, Belgium at the age of 100. The Nature obituary noted that Rasetti was one of the most prolific generalists whose work and writing are noted for the elegance, simplicity and beauty.

== Raman spectroscopy and the model of the atomic nucleus ==
After the discovery of Raman scattering by organic liquids, Rasetti decided to study the same phenomenon in gases at high pressure during his stay at Caltech in 1928–29. The spectra showed vibrational transitions with rotational fine structure. In the homonuclear diatomic molecules H_{2}, N_{2} and O_{2}, Rasetti found an alternation of strong and weak lines. This alternation was explained by Gerhard Herzberg and Walter Heitler as a consequence of nuclear spin isomerism.

For dihydrogen, each nucleus is a proton of spin 1/2, so that it can be shown using quantum mechanics and the Pauli exclusion principle that the odd rotational levels are more populated than the even levels. The transitions originating from odd levels are therefore more intense as observed by Rasetti. In dinitrogen, however, Rasetti observed that the lines originating from even levels are more intense. This implies by a similar analysis that the nuclear spin of nitrogen is an integer.

This result was difficult to understand at the time, however, because the neutron had not yet been discovered, and it was thought that the ^{14}N nucleus contains 14 protons and 7 electrons, or an odd number (21) of particles in total which would correspond to a half-integral spin. The Raman spectrum observed by Rasetti provided the first experimental evidence that this proton-electron model of the nucleus is inadequate, because the predicted half-integral spin has as a consequence that transitions from odd rotational levels would be more intense than those from even levels, due to nuclear spin isomerism as shown by Herzberg and Heitler for dihydrogen. After the discovery of the neutron in 1932, Werner Heisenberg proposed that the nucleus contains protons and neutrons, and the ^{14}N nucleus contains 7 protons and 7 neutrons. The even total number (14) of particles corresponds to an integral spin in agreement with Rasetti's spectrum.

He is also credited with the first example of electronic (as opposed to vibronic) Raman scattering in nitric oxide.

== Awards ==
- In 1952 he was awarded the Charles Doolittle Walcott Medal by the National Academy of Sciences for his contributions to Cambrian paleontology.
