= Orso Mario Corbino =

Italian physicist and politician (1876–1937)

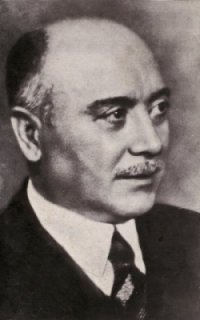

Minister of Economy
- In office 5 July 1923 – 1 July 1924
- Prime Minister: Benito Mussolini
- Preceded by: Teofilo Rossi
- Succeeded by: Cesare Nava

Minister of Public Education
- In office 4 July 1921 – 22 February 1922
- Prime Minister: Ivanoe Bonomi
- Preceded by: Benedetto Croce
- Succeeded by: Alessandro Casati

Member of the Senate of the Kingdom
- In office 3 October 1920 – 23 January 1937
- Appointed by: Victor Emmanuel III

President of the Accademia nazionale delle scienze
- In office 20 April 1932 – 8 January 1937
- Preceded by: Emanuele Paternò
- Succeeded by: Aldo Castellani

Personal details
- Born: 30 April 1876 Augusta, Sicily, Kingdom of Italy
- Died: 23 January 1937 (aged 60) Rome, Kingdom of Italy
- Party: Italian Liberal Party
- Education: University of Palermo
- Profession: Physicist
- Scientific career
- Known for: Corbino effect
- Awards: Matteucci Medal (1909); Mussolini Science Prize (1933)
- Workplaces: University of Messina; University of Rome

Orso Mario Corbino (30 April 1876 – 23 January 1937) was an Italian physicist and politician. He is noted for his studies of the influence of external magnetic fields on the motion of electrons in metals and he discovered the Corbino effect. He served as Minister for education in 1921–1922 and as Minister for National Economy in 1923–1924. He also served as professor of the University of Messina (1905) and of the University of Rome (1908). He was also the supervisor of the Via Panisperna boys (including Enrico Fermi).

== Life ==
His younger brother was Epicarmo Corbino.

Corbino graduated from the University of Palermo at the age of 20. There he worked as assistant of Damiano Macaluso, discovering the Macaluso-Corbino effect, a strong magneto-rotation of the plane of polarization observed at wavelengths close to an absorption line of the material through which the light is travelling.

In 1905 he obtained the chair of experimental physics at the University of Messina, but had to transfer to the University of Rome after the 1908 Messina earthquake.

In 1909, Corbino won the Matteucci Medal for his contributions to physics.

In 1911 he discovered the Corbino effect, a variant of the Hall effect.

In photoelasticity, he verified Vito Volterra's theory of elastic dislocations.

In academia, he was a national member of the Accademia dei Lincei, president of the Accademia nazionale delle scienze, known as the XL, from 1914 to 1919 and president of the Italian Physical Society.

In politics, he served as president of the Superior Council of Water and Public Works in 1917, senator in 1920, Minister of Education in 1921 and Minister of National Economy in 1923–24 on direct assignment from Benito Mussolini, although Corbino was not a member of the National Fascist Party. He was also President of the General Electricity Company and of the Southern Electricity Company.

In 1936, he founded the Institute of Electroacoustics of the National Research Council, in Via Panisperna.

As director of the Institute of physics he was the supervisor of the Via Panisperna boys, which included Enrico Fermi, Edoardo Amaldi, Franco Rasetti, Emilio Segrè, Bruno Pontecorvo, Oscar D'Agostino, Ettore Majorana, and Elena Freda. Fermi's team would result in the discovery of slow neutrons, important for the development of nuclear reactor and nuclear weapons. In playful manner, Fermi was referred by the rest as 'the pope' (Italian: Il Papa) and Corbino was known as 'God Almighty' (Italian: Padreterno), for his ability to miraculously generate funds and positions.

== Works ==
- Meccanica, acustica, cosmografia (in Italian). Vol. 1. Palermo: Sandron. 1921.
- Calore, ottica, elettricità e magnetismo (in Italian). Vol. 2. Palermo: Sandron. 1921.
