= Bruno Pontecorvo =

Italian nuclear physicist (1913–1993)

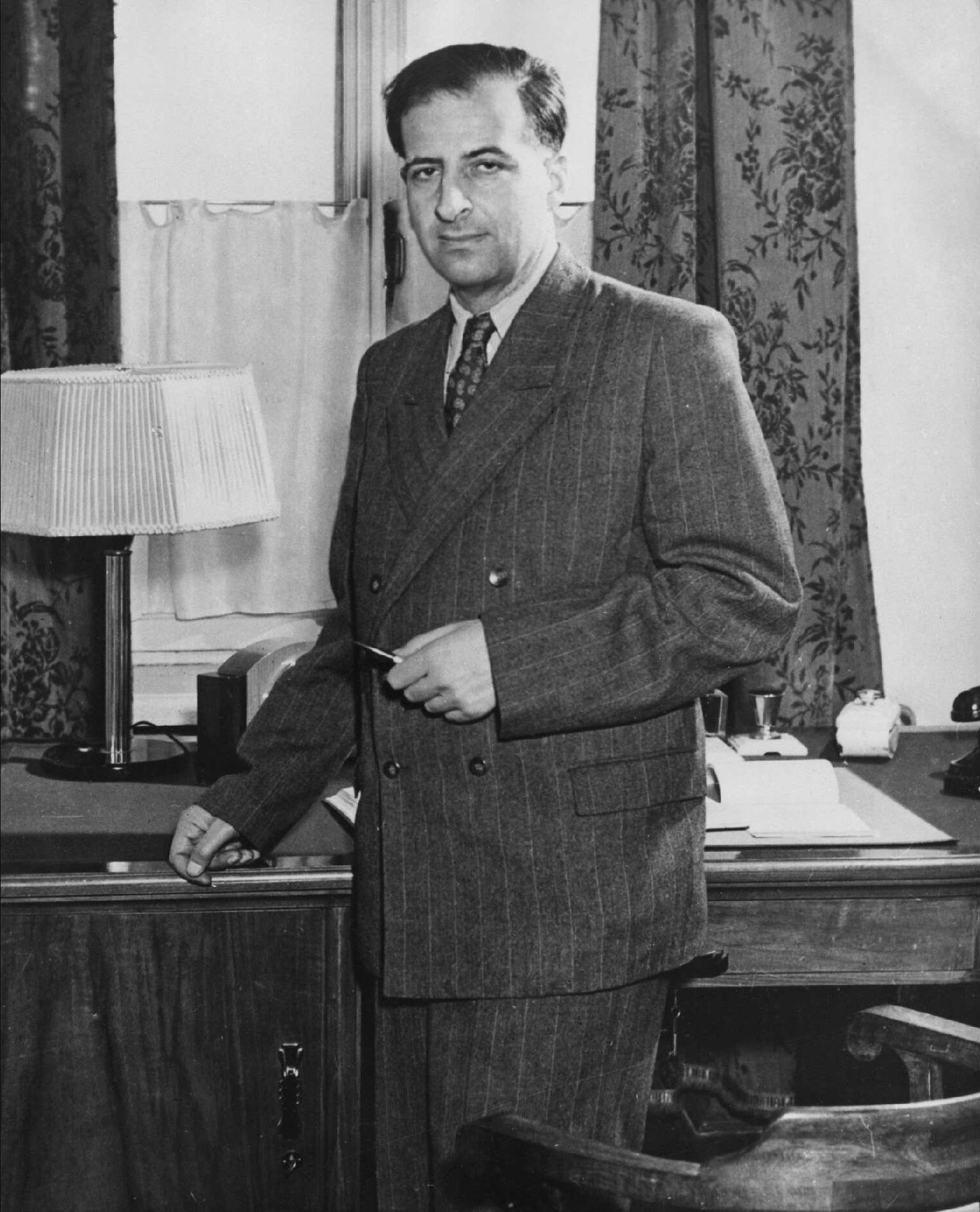
- Pontecorvo in 1955
- Born: 22 August 1913; Marina di Pisa, Italy
- Died: 24 September 1993 (aged 80); Dubna, Moscow Oblast, Russia
- Citizenship: Italy, Britain, Soviet Union, Russia
- Education: University of Rome La Sapienza
- Known for: Neutrino oscillation; Induced gamma emission; Radiochemical neutrino detection method; Pontecorvo–Maki–Nakagawa–Sakata matrix
- Relatives: Gillo Pontecorvo (brother); Guido Pontecorvo (brother); Marco Pontecorvo (nephew)
- Awards: Stalin Prize (1953)
- Scientific career
- Fields: Nuclear physics
- Workplaces: Collège de France; Well Surveys; Montreal Laboratory; Chalk River Laboratories; Atomic Energy Research Establishment; Joint Institute for Nuclear Research
- Academic advisors: Enrico Fermi

Bruno Pontecorvo (Italian: [ponteˈkɔrvo]; Russian: Бру́но Макси́мович Понтеко́рво, Bruno Maksimovich Pontecorvo; 22 August 1913 – 24 September 1993) was an Italian–Russian nuclear physicist, an early assistant of Enrico Fermi and the author of numerous studies in high energy physics, especially on neutrinos. A convinced communist, he defected to the Soviet Union in 1950, where he continued his research on the decay of the muon and on neutrinos. The prestigious Pontecorvo Prize was instituted in his memory in 1995.

The fourth of eight children of a wealthy Jewish-Italian family, Pontecorvo studied physics at the Sapienza University, under Fermi, becoming the youngest of his Via Panisperna boys. In 1934 he participated in Fermi's famous experiment showing the properties of slow neutrons that led the way to the discovery of nuclear fission. He moved to Paris in 1936, where he conducted research under Irène and Frédéric Joliot-Curie. Influenced by his cousin, Emilio Sereni, he joined the Italian Communist Party, whose leaders were in Paris as refugees, and as did his sisters Giuliana and Laura and brother Gillo. The Italian Fascist regime's 1938 racial laws against Jews caused his family members to leave Italy for Britain, France and the United States.

When the German Army closed in on Paris during the Second World War, Pontecorvo, his brother Gillo, cousin Emilio Sereni and Salvador Luria fled the city on bicycles. He eventually made his way to Tulsa, Oklahoma, where he applied his knowledge of nuclear physics to prospecting for oil and minerals. In 1943, he joined the British Tube Alloys team at the Montreal Laboratory in Canada. This became part of the Manhattan Project to develop the first atomic bombs. At Chalk River Laboratories, he worked on the design of the nuclear reactor ZEEP, the first reactor outside of the United States, which went critical in 1945, followed by the NRX reactor in 1947. He also looked into cosmic rays, the decay of muons, and what would become his speciality, neutrinos. He moved to Britain in 1949, where he worked for the Atomic Energy Research Establishment at Harwell.

After his defection to the Soviet Union in 1950, he worked at the Joint Institute for Nuclear Research (JINR) in Dubna. He had proposed using chlorine to detect neutrinos. In a 1959 paper, he argued that the electron neutrino (ν_{e}) and the muon neutrino (ν_{μ}) were different particles. Solar neutrinos were detected by the Homestake experiment, but only between one third and one half of the predicted number were found. In response to this solar neutrino problem, he proposed a phenomenon known as neutrino oscillation, whereby electron neutrinos became muon neutrinos. The existence of the oscillations was finally established by the Super-Kamiokande experiment in 1998. He also predicted in 1958 that supernovae would produce intense bursts of neutrinos, which was confirmed in 1987 when Supernova SN1987A was detected by neutrino detectors.

== Biography ==
=== Early life and education ===
Pontecorvo was born on 22 August 1913 in Marina di Pisa, the fourth of eight children of Massimo Pontecorvo and his wife Maria née Maroni. His older brother Guido, who was born in 1907, became a geneticist. Another older brother, Paolo, who was born in 1909, became an engineer who worked on radar during World War II. His older sister Giuliana was born in 1911. His younger brother Gillo was born in 1919, and is best known as the director of The Battle of Algiers. He also had two younger sisters: Laura, who was born in 1921, and Anna, who was born in 1924, and a younger brother, Giovanni, who was born in 1926. His family was wealthy; Massimo owned three textile factories employing over 1,000 people. The family was Jewish and non-observant, from Rome on his father's side and from Mantua - on his mother's. His grandfather on the maternal side, Arrigo Maroni (1852–1924), born in Mantua, was director of the Fatebenefratelli Hospital in Milan; his mother's cousin was a notable zoologist, Elisa Gurrieri-Norsa (1868–1939).

He entered the University of Pisa intending to study engineering, but after two years, he decided to switch to physics in 1931. On the advice of his brother Guido, he decided to study at the University of Rome La Sapienza, where Enrico Fermi had gathered together a group of promising young scientists known as the Via Panisperna boys after the name of the street where the Institute of Physics of Rome University was then situated. At the age of 18, he was admitted to the third year of Physics. Fermi described Pontecorvo as "scientifically one of the brightest men with whom I have come in contact in my scientific career". As their youngest member, the group nicknamed him Cucciolo, which means "puppy".

In 1934, Pontecorvo contributed to Fermi's famous experiment showing the properties of slow neutrons that led the way to the discovery of nuclear fission. Pontecorvo's name was included on the Via Panisperna boys' patent "To increase the production of artificial radioactivity with neutron bombardment". He was made a temporary assistant at the Royal Institute of Physics on 1 November 1934 and the University of Rome, and on 7 November, he was listed as co-author, along with Fermi and Rasetti, of a landmark paper on slow neutrons that reported that hydrogen slowed neutrons more than heavy elements, and that slow neutrons were more easily absorbed. An Italian patent was granted for the process in October 1935, in the name of Fermi, Pontecorvo, Edoardo Amaldi, Franco Rasetti and Emilio Segrè. A US patent was granted on 2 July 1940.

=== Early career ===
In February 1936, Pontecorvo left Italy and moved to Paris to work in the laboratory of Irène and Frédéric Joliot-Curie at the Collège de France on a one-year scholarship to study the effects of collisions of neutrons with protons and on the electromagnetic transitions among isomers. During this period, influenced by his cousin, Emilio Sereni, he adopted the ideals of communism to which he remained loyal for the rest of his life. He formed a relationship with Helene Marianne Nordblom, a Swedish woman working in Paris as a nanny. Whether because of his relationship with Marianne, his interesting work on isomers, or the deteriorating political situation in Italy, he turned down an opportunity in 1937 to apply for a tenured position at the University of Rome to stay in Paris.

Marianne moved in with Pontecorvo at the Hôtel des Grands Hommes on the Place du Panthéon on 4 January 1938. Their son, Gil, was born on 30 July. Her visa expired, and she had to return to Sweden in September. Pontecorvo accompanied her, leaving Gil behind in a residential nursery in Paris. Travelling back to Paris alone, he dined with Manne Siegbahn and met with Niels Bohr and Lise Meitner on 12 October 1938. Pontecorvo was now unable to return to Italy because of the Fascist regime's racial laws against the Jews. This caused the breakup of the Via Panisperna boys, with Fermi moving to the United States. Pontecorvo's family also dispersed. Guido moved to Britain in 1938, followed by Giovanni, Laura and Anna in 1939, while Gillo joined Pontecorvo in Paris.

Working in collaboration with the French physicist André Lazard at Joliot-Curie's laboratory at Ivry-sur-Seine, Pontecorvo discovered what Frédéric Joliot-Curie called "nuclear phosphorescence"; the emission of X-rays when neutrons and protons were excited and returned to their ground state. He also discovered that some isomers do not change into other elements on decaying radioactively. This expanded the scope for their use in medical applications. For this ground-breaking research, Pontecorvo received a Curie-Carnegie scholarship and funding for his work from the French National Centre for Scientific Research.

=== Second World War ===
==== Escape from France ====
In June 1939, Pontecorvo applied for a visa to visit Sweden, but his application was rejected. On 23 August came the news of the Molotov–Ribbentrop Pact. He joined the French Communist Party the next day as an affirmation of his personal faith in the Soviet Union. Marianne rejoined him in Paris on 6 September 1939, three days after the British and French declaration of war on Germany in response to the German invasion of Poland that started the Second World War in Europe. They were married on 9 January 1940.

As the Germans closed in on the city in May 1940, they decided to leave. Although the British offered refuge to French nuclear scientists, including Hans von Halban and Lew Kowarski, they regarded Pontecorvo as an "undesirable". Fortunately, Segrè had been given an offer of employment in Tulsa, Oklahoma, by two European expatriates who were looking for an expert on neutron physics. Segrè had turned down the offer — he already had a good job at the University of California — but recommended Pontecorvo.

On 2 June 1940, he saw Marianne and Gil off with their chattels on a train to Toulouse, where his sister Giuliana lived with her husband, Duccio Tabet. On 13 June, just a day before the Germans entered Paris, Pontecorvo, his brother Gillo, cousin Emilio Sereni and Salvador Luria set out for Toulouse on bicycles. It took them ten days to reach Toulouse. Luria went to Marseilles, from whence he eventually made his way to the United States. Pontecorvo, Marianne, Gil, Giuliana and Tabet boarded a train that took them to Lisbon via Madrid on 19 July 1940. Both women were pregnant. Marianne had a miscarriage and was hardly fit to travel, but nonetheless boarded the liner Quanza on 9 August 1940 on its voyage bringing refugees to the United States. Both women were seasick. On 19 August 1940, the ship reached New York City, where they stayed with his brother Paolo. While there, he visited Fermi at his new home in Leonia, New Jersey.

==== Prospecting in Oklahoma ====
In Tulsa, Pontecorvo went to work for two European migrants, Jakov "Jake" Neufeld and Serge Alexandrovich Scherbatskoy, who had founded a company called Well Surveys with funds provided by Standard Oil. Their idea was to apply nuclear physics to searching for minerals. A gamma ray device had been successful at analysing rock outcroppings. Inspired by the work done in Italy and France, they reasoned that neutrons, being without electrical charge, might be able to detect different elements beneath the surface by inducing radioactivity on the rocks. In Pontecorvo, they had the expert they needed.

Pontecorvo created a neutron source using radium and beryllium, as the Via Panisperna boys had, with paraffin wax as a neutron moderator, and measured the absorption of different minerals using methods developed by Fermi and Amaldi. By June 1941, he had a device that could differentiate shale, limestone and sandstone, and map the transitions between them. The technique may be considered the first practical application of the discovery of slow neutrons, and would still be in use decades later for well logging. He filed four patents relating to his instrumentation.

By late 1941, Pontecorvo was having difficulty securing the radioisotopes that he needed. Unbeknown to him, the Manhattan Project, the wartime effort to build atomic bombs, was cornering the market. In an attempt to obtain them, he met with Fermi, von Halban and George Placzek in New York in April 1942. He was unable to secure the supplies he wanted, but Fermi showed an unexpected keen interest in the Wells Surveys work.

==== Tube Alloys ====
The meeting with Fermi yielded no supplies, but it did result in Pontecorvo receiving an offer from von Halban and Placzek to join the Tube Alloys team at the Montreal Laboratory in Canada. There was some concern from Sir Edward Appleton over his appointment, not because of Pontecorvo's political beliefs, but because he was not a British national, and there were already a large number of foreign scientists working on Tube Alloys. Appleton was ultimately persuaded due to Pontecorvo's reputation and the fact that good physicists were in short supply. Pontecorvo was officially appointed to Tube Alloys on 15 January 1943, and arrived in Montreal with his family on 7 February 1943. The Montreal team designed a nuclear reactor using heavy water as a neutron moderator, but lacked the quantity of heavy water needed. In August 1943, Churchill and Roosevelt negotiated the Quebec Agreement, which resulted in a resumption of cooperation between the United States and Great Britain, merging Tube Alloys into the Manhattan Project.

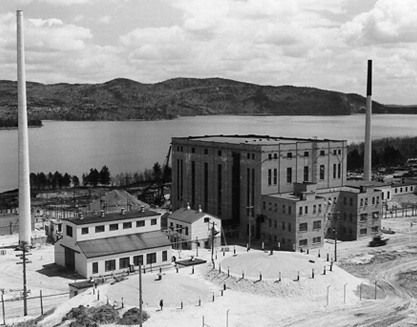
NRX and ZEEP buildings at Chalk River in 1945. NRX was for a time the world's most powerful research reactor.

John Cockcroft became director of the Montreal Laboratory in 1944. For safety reasons, he decided to build the reactor at the remote Chalk River Laboratories. With an eye on a post-war nuclear program, he had Pontecorvo and Alan Nunn May "debrief" Manhattan Project scientists who visited Canada, in practice spying for Britain. Unfortunately, Nunn May was also a Soviet spy. Pontecorvo's second son was born on 20 March 1944, and was named Tito after the Yugoslavian communist leader. A third son, Antonio, was born in July 1945. With heavy water supplied by the United States, the reactor at Chalk River, known as ZEEP, went critical on 5 September 1945. In addition to reactor design, Pontecorvo also looked into cosmic rays, the decay of muons, and what would become his obsession, neutrinos. He wrote 25 papers related to reactor design, although only two were published. He also did some prospecting with his old firm, searching for uranium deposits near Port Radium in the Northwest Territories.

Physicists were in great demand after the war ended in August 1945, and Pontecorvo received attractive and lucrative offers from several universities in the United States. Instead, on 21 February 1946, he accepted an offer from Cockcroft to join the British Atomic Energy Research Establishment (AERE). For the time being, he remained at Chalk River for the commissioning of the new NRX reactor in 1947. He was one of four physicists present in the control room when the NRX was started up on the night of 21–22 July 1947. At the time, it had five times the neutron flux of any other reactor, and was the most powerful research reactor in the world. He acquired the nickname "Ramon Novarro" after the actor of that name following an adventure in which he made a trip to Boston with two women, which culminated in Marianne clearing out the bank account and departing for Banff with the children; but they were reconciled. Although he had previously taken steps to become a United States citizen, he instead became a British subject on 7 February 1948. He finally departed Chalk River for the United Kingdom on 24 January 1949.

=== Defection ===
At Harwell, Pontecorvo continued to be involved in reactor design projects. As a member of the Power Steering Committee (PSC), he was involved in discussions of the production and use of fissile materials, and of the materials used in the construction of reactors. In 1949, other Via Panisperna boys, particularly Emilio Segrè, began to press their claim over patents relating to the behaviour of slow neutrons, which were at the heart of nuclear reactor—and nuclear weapon—design. The American Federal Bureau of Investigation (FBI), therefore, began looking into their backgrounds. It noted, from its 1943 Manhattan Project files, that Pontecorvo's siblings Giuliana, Laura and Gillo were communists, and that Pontecorvo and Marianne were probably communists too, and reported this to MI5 in Britain, and MI6's Kim Philby in Washington, D.C.

In February 1950, Pontecorvo's Harwell colleague Klaus Fuchs was arrested for espionage, and the AERE began to take security more seriously, and Pontecorvo was interviewed by Henry Arnold, the security officer at AERE. While Arnold had no evidence that Pontecorvo was a Soviet spy, he did feel that he was a security risk, and recommended that he be moved to a position where he did not have access to Top Secret material. Herbert Skinner suggested to Pontecorvo that he apply for a newly created professorship at the University of Liverpool, where Skinner held the Lyon Jones chair of experimental physics. In June 1950, Pontecorvo was offered the position.

On 1 September 1950, in the middle of a holiday in Italy, Pontecorvo abruptly flew from Rome to Stockholm with his wife and three sons without informing friends or relatives. On 2 September, he was helped by Soviet agents to enter the Soviet Union from Finland. His abrupt disappearance caused much concern to many of the Western intelligence services, especially those of Britain, Canada and the United States, which were worried about the escape of atomic secrets to the Soviet Union, and of Finland and Sweden, through which Pontecorvo and Marianne had been allowed to travel without valid passports and visas.

According to the CIA, citing an Asahi Shimbun article: "In late March 1951, a KMT intelligence source in Taipei revealed that the famous British atomic scientist, Pontecorvo, who disappeared in the fall of 1950, had recently appeared in Xinjiang. The same source claimed that he is now working at an atomic bomb plant in Kuldja near the Soviet border." In 1952, Pontecorvo's potential role in the transfer of nuclear secrets to Russia was discussed in American newspapers.

According to Oleg Gordievsky, the highest-ranking KGB officer ever to defect, and Pavel Sudoplatov, the former deputy director of Foreign Intelligence for the Soviet Union, Pontecorvo was a Soviet spy. However, Sudoplatov misidentified Pontecorvo as the spy codenamed Mlad, who is now known to be Ted Hall. While Pontecorvo always denied working on nuclear weapons, in Canada, Britain or the Soviet Union, he never confirmed or denied that he was a spy. The actual evidence against him was flimsy. Frank Close noted that the blueprints of the Canadian NRX reactor had made their way to the Soviet Union, and Lona Cohen obtained a sample of uranium from the NRX after it started operation in 1947. Nunn May could not have been the culprit, so Pontecorvo is the prime suspect. In the USSR, Pontecorvo was welcomed with honours and given privileges reserved only to the Soviet nomenklatura. He worked until his death in what is now the Joint Institute for Nuclear Research (JINR) in Dubna, concentrating entirely on theoretical studies of high-energy particles and continuing his research on neutrinos and decay of muons. In recognition of his research, he was awarded the Stalin Prize in 1953, membership in the Communist Party of the Soviet Union in 1955 and the Academy of Sciences of the Soviet Union in 1958, and two Orders of Lenin. He was awarded the Lenin Prize in 1964 for his work on the weak interaction. He began a lifelong affair with Rodam Amiredzhibi, the wife of poet Mikhail Svetlov, in 1950. In 1955, he appeared in public at a press conference where he explained to the world the motivations of his choice to leave the West and work in the Soviet Union. As a result, the United Kingdom revoked his British citizenship on 24 May 1955. Pontecorvo was not permitted to leave the Soviet Union for many years; his first trip abroad was in 1978 when he travelled to Italy for celebrations of Amaldi's 70th birthday. Thereafter, he made frequent trips to Italy and occasional visits to other countries. France refused to allow him to visit in 1982 and 1984, but relented in 1989.

=== Later life ===
The scientific work of Pontecorvo is full of formidable intuitions, some of which have represented milestones in modern physics. Much of this involved the neutrino, a subatomic particle first proposed theoretically by Wolfgang Pauli in 1930 in order to explain undetected energy that escaped during beta decay so that the law of conservation of energy was not violated. Fermi named it the neutrino, Italian for "little neutral one", and in 1934, proposed his theory of beta decay which explained that the electrons emitted from the nucleus were created by the decay of a neutron into a proton, an electron, and a neutrino. Initially neutrinos were thought to be undetectable, but in 1945 Pontecorvo noted that a neutrino striking a chlorine nucleus could transform it into unstable argon-37 that emits, with a 34 days half-life, after a K-capture reaction, a 2.8 keV Auger electron allowing its direct detection:

ν + ^{37}Cl → e^{−} + ^{37}Ar

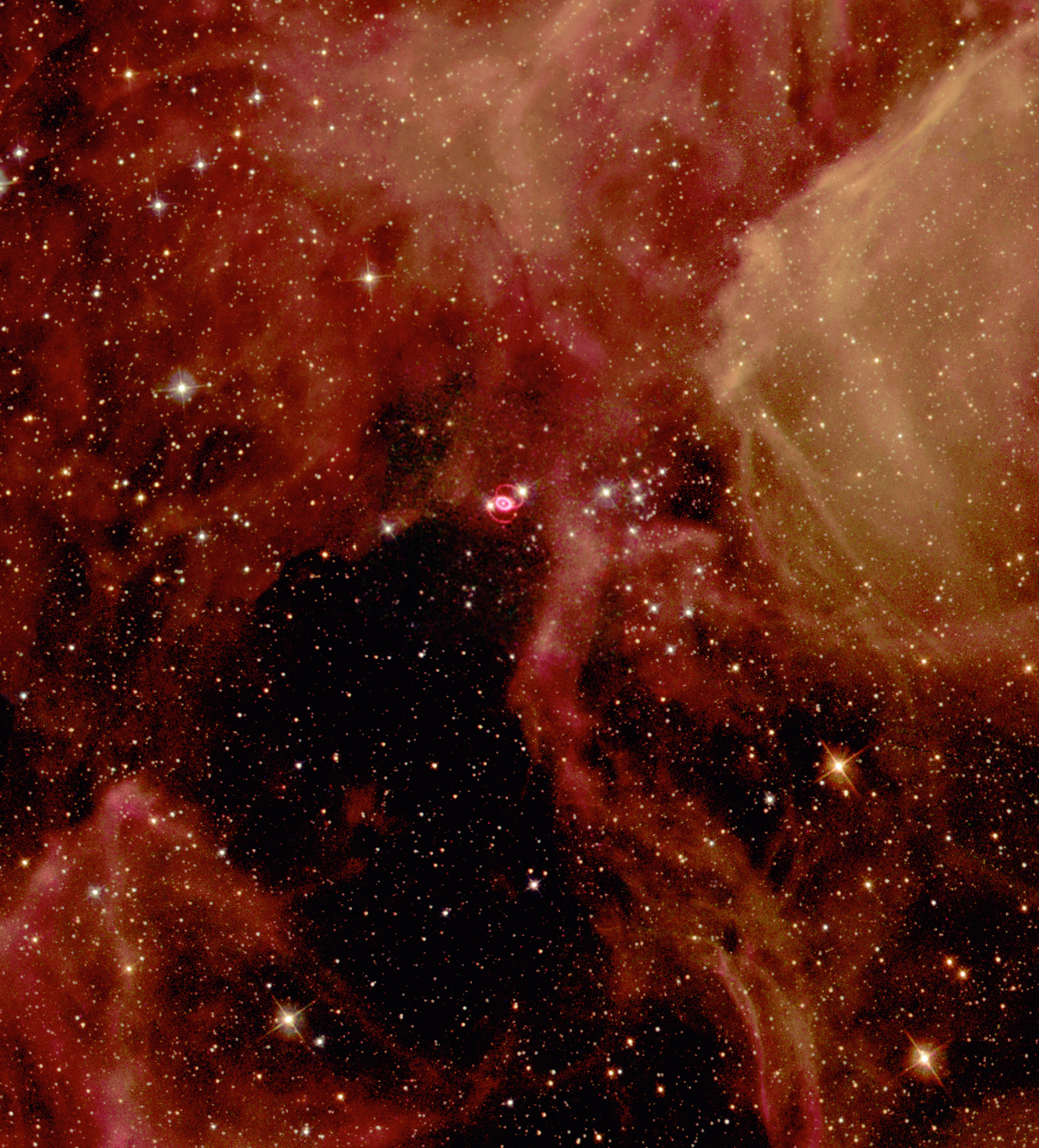
Supernova SN1987A (the bright object in the centre), as seen through the Hubble Space Telescope

Pontecorvo's 1945 paper credits the idea using carbon tetrachloride (CCl_{4}) to the French physicist Jules Guéron. Experiments were conducted at Chalk River using the NRX as a neutrino source, but were unsuccessful, and were abandoned in 1949, after Pontecorvo had left. The experiment was unsuccessful because, unknown at the time, nuclear reactors produced antineutrinos instead of neutrinos. In what is now known as the Cowan–Reines neutrino experiment, Frederick Reines and Clyde Cowan detected antineutrinos in 1955, for which Reines won the Nobel Prize in Physics in 1995.

The idea was taken up again in the search for solar neutrinos. Theoretically, the Sun produced neutrinos in the course of nuclear fusion reactions. Pontecorvo credited Maurice Pryce for this idea. The most common, the proton–proton chain reaction in which hydrogen is fused to form helium produces neutrinos that are not energetic enough to interact with chlorine. However, the much less common CNO cycle that produces carbon, nitrogen and oxygen does. In the late 1960s, Ray Davis and John N. Bahcall detected solar neutrinos in the Homestake Experiment, for which Davis was awarded the Nobel Prize in Physics in 2002. The experiment was the first to successfully detect and count solar neutrinos, but the number of neutrinos detected was between one third and one half of the predicted number. This became the solar neutrino problem. For a time, scientists contemplated the awful possibility that the Sun might have burned out.

The problem had already been solved by Pontecorvo in 1968. In 1959, a powerful accelerator (that was never built) was being designed, and he began considering experiments that could be performed with it. He contemplated a project investigating muons. Julian Schwinger had hypothesised that particles experience the weak interaction through exchanging W bosons. The W boson would not be discovered until 1983, but a problem immediately surfaced. Gerald Feinberg pointed out that this implied that some interactions that had never been observed should occur, but conceded that this was only true if the neutrinos associated with electrons were the same as those associated with muons.

In a 1959 paper, Pontecorvo listed 21 possible reactions involving neutrinos and noted that some of them could not occur unless the electron neutrino (ν_{e}) and the muon neutrino (ν_{μ}) were one and the same. (Thus, an inability to find those reactions would be evidence that there were two types of neutrinos.) This paper introduced this notation for neutrinos, which we use today, and listed the reasons why he felt that having two types of neutrinos was "attractive from the point of view of symmetry and the classification of particles". The prediction that neutrinos associated with electrons are different from those associated with muons was confirmed in 1962. In 1988 Jack Steinberger, Leon M. Lederman and Melvin Schwartz were awarded the Nobel Prize in Physics for the discovery of the muon neutrino.

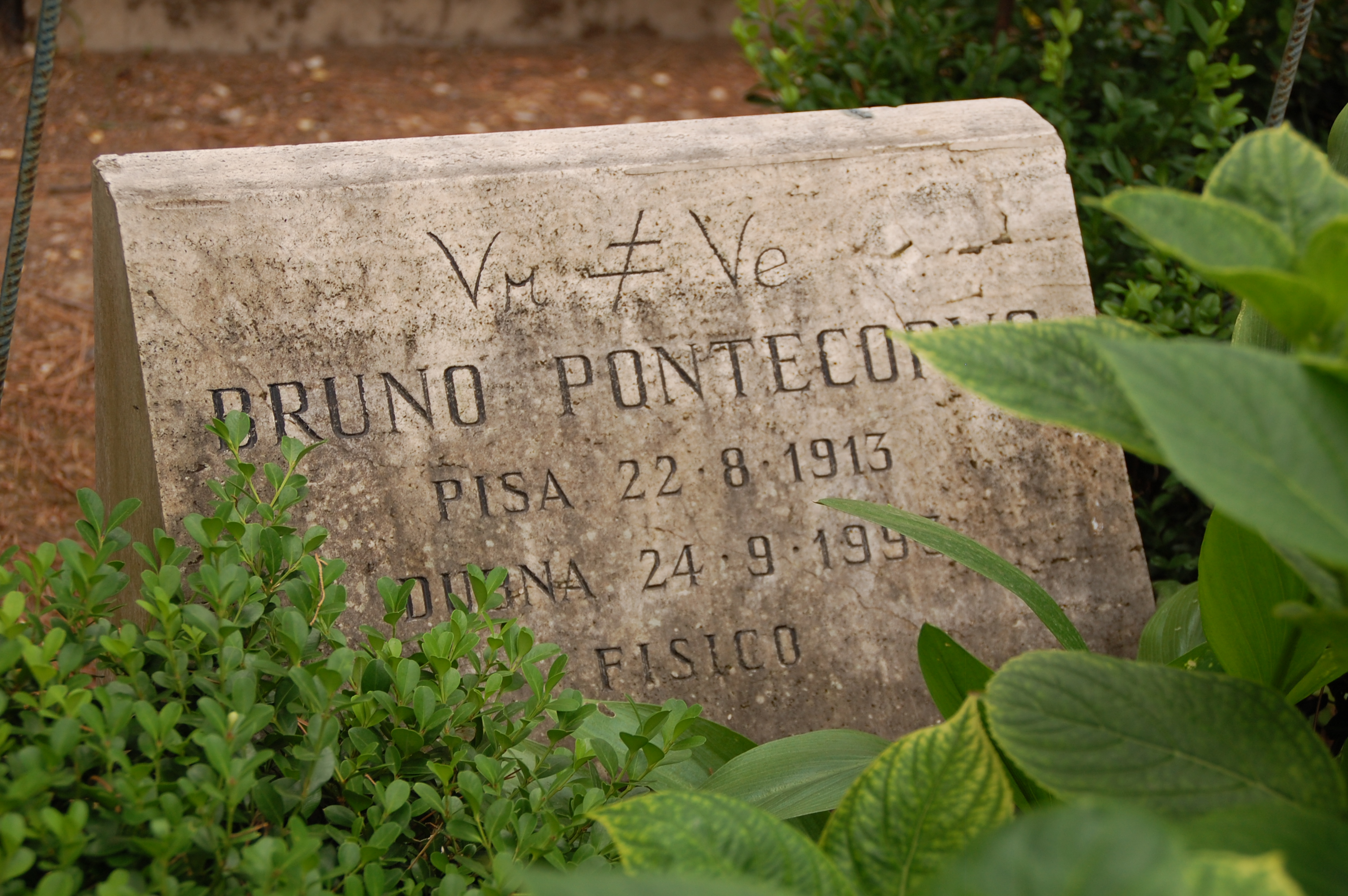
Pontecorvo's gravestone at the Cimitero Acattolico of Rome

Pontecorvo's solution to the solar neutrino problem involved an idea that he had first considered in 1957 and developed over the following decade. This was the idea that neutrinos may convert into other types of neutrinos, a phenomenon known as neutrino oscillation. Somewhere between the Sun and the Earth, electron neutrinos might transform into muon neutrinos. An important point was that for this to happen, neutrinos could not have zero mass, and therefore could not travel at the speed of light. The existence of the oscillations was finally established by the Super-Kamiokande experiment in 1998 and later confirmed by other experiments.

This prediction was recognised by the 2015 Nobel Prize in physics, awarded to Takaaki Kajita and Arthur B. McDonald "for the discovery of neutrino oscillations, which shows that neutrinos have mass". Pontecorvo also predicted in 1958 that supernovae would produce intense bursts of neutrinos. Few scientists were more excited when Supernova SN1987A was detected by neutrino detectors.

Pontecorvo died in Dubna on 24 September 1993, afflicted by Parkinson's disease. In accordance with his wishes, half of his ashes were buried in the Protestant Cemetery in Rome, and another half in Dubna in Russia. In 1995, in recognition of his scientific merits, the prestigious Pontecorvo Prize has been instituted by the Joint Institute for Nuclear Research. The prize, awarded annually to an individual scientist, recognises "the most significant investigations in elementary particle physics", as acknowledged by the international scientific community. In 2006, Moscow historical society Moskultprog unveiled an artistic plaque celebrating Pontecorvo's Moscow house at 9 Tverskaya Street.

== Sources ==
- Albright, Joseph; Kunstel, Marcia (1997). Bombshell : the Secret Story of America's Unknown Atomic Spy Conspiracy. New York: Times Books. ISBN 978-0-8129-2861-7. OCLC 38126209.
- Andrew, Christopher M.; Gordievsky, Oleg (1990). KGB: The Inside Story of its Foreign Operations from Lenin to Gorbachev. New York: HarperCollins. ISBN 0-06-016605-3. OCLC 22579547.
- Close, Frank (2010). Neutrino. Oxford: Oxford University Press. ISBN 978-0-19-969599-7. OCLC 756279007.
- Close, Frank (2015). Half-Life: The Divided Life of Bruno Pontecorvo, Physicist or Spy. New York: Basic Books. ISBN 978-0-465-06998-9. OCLC 897001600.
- Fermi, Laura (1954). Atoms in the Family: My Life with Enrico Fermi. Chicago: University of Chicago Press. OCLC 537507.
- Gowing, Margaret (1964). Britain and Atomic Energy, 1935–1945. London: Macmillan Publishing. OCLC 3195209.
- Sudoplatov, Pavel; Sudoplatov, Anatoli; Schecter, Jerrold L.; Schecter, Leona P. (1995). Special Tasks: the Memoirs of an Unwanted Witness, a Soviet Spymaster. Boston: Little, Brown. ISBN 0-316-82115-2. OCLC 30325282.
- Turchetti, Simone (December 2003). "Atomic Secrets and Governmental Lies: Nuclear Science, Politics and Security in the Pontecorvo case" (PDF). British Journal for the History of Science. 36 (4): 389–415. doi:10.1017/S0007087403005120. JSTOR 4028213. S2CID 145681155.
- Turchetti, Simone (2012). The Pontecorvo Affair: a Cold War Defection and Nuclear Physics. Chicago: University of Chicago Press. ISBN 978-0-226-81664-7. OCLC 711050900.
