= Sergey Nikitin =

Sergey or Sergei Nikitin may refer to:

- Sergey Nikitin (musician) (born 1944) Russian bard
- Sergei Vasilyevich Nikitin (born 1963), Soviet and Russian footballer
- Sergey Nikitin (historian) Russian historian and founder of Moskultprog
- Sergei Nikitin (geologist) (1851–1909), Russian geologist
- Sergey Nikitin (decathlete) (born 1973), Russian decathlete and medallist at the European Cup Combined Events
