= Neutron Trail =

The Neutron Trail is a cultural project about the development and use of nuclear technology. Its subjects include nuclear power, nuclear disarmament, energy demand, sustainability, and public attitudes toward nuclear energy. The project has included visits to people and places connected with nuclear development, public lectures, workshops, and transmedia projects.

== Travels ==
Enrico Fermi built the first nuclear reactor (Chicago Pile-1) in an abandoned squash court at the University of Chicago. He ran the historic experiment for 28 minutes. In April 2009 artist Matthew Day Jackson invited Olivia to participate in a ceremonial game of squash. Jackson and the younger Fermi's game tied “the physics of a squash ball to the physics of the first nuclear reactor”; was filmed in Los Alamos, New Mexico and displayed in a 28–minute video loop at the M.I.T. List Visual Arts Center and the Contemporary Arts Museum Houston.

Jackson also filmed Olivia's visit to Trinity in Southern New Mexico, location of the first atomic bomb test on July 16, 1945.

On September 29, 2011, for the 110th anniversary of Enrico Fermi's birth, she visited her grandfather's former lab at Via Panisperna in Rome, where Enrico conducted his Nobel Prize–winning research. It is now the site of Centro Fermi: Enrico Fermi Historical Museum of Physics.

In October 2011 Olivia visited CERN in Geneva, Switzerland. She toured various key experimental areas including the CERN Control Centre, ATLAS, the SM18 magnet test facility, and ISOLDE; met with Nobel Prize in Physics-winning physicist and former director of CERN Carlo Rubbia; and joined in a discussion with CERN's ConCERNed for Humanity Club founders and guests.

Her visit to Richland, WA in 2012 drew the interest of scientists, students and environmental activists who came to her talk and workshops. She travelled to Hiroshima and Nagasaki in November 2014 extending her dialogue project to speaking with atomic bomb survivors including Toshiko Tanaka and artist who promotes peace.

== Public events ==
Fermi has given Neutron Trail talks in the US, Canada and Europe. On Jan 19, 2012, she gave a talk sponsored by the United Nations Association in Canada titled “Positioning Change and Global Nuclear Disarmament.” She presented personal stories of activists, images and timelines of individuals championing the nuclear disarmament movement.

A TEDx Transmedia Talk in Rome on September 30, 2011, entitled “Becoming the Inspiration We Seek – The Alchemy of Opposites.” is about the power of embracing contradictions, especially those inherent in our nuclear legacy, such as the thrill of discovery commingled with the pride and shame of the Hiroshima and Nagasaki bombings. It includes a photograph of her grandfather Enrico Fermi, with physicist Edward Teller, holding an image of the Hiroshima bomb cloud.

On March 21, 2011, BBC World Radio contacted Fermi to give an interview regarding the crisis — then taking place — at the Fukushima 1 Nuclear Power Plant in Japan. During the five-minute interview, she spoke about her position on nuclear energy and the Neutron Trail. On April 15, 2011, Olivia was the keynote speaker for the Society of Italian Researchers and Professionals of Western Canada's inaugural meeting. This Neutron Trail talk was about her grandparents’ lives with personal anecdotes and archival images. During the question and answer period, she offered her opinions on the Fukushima Daiichi disaster: “Today we need nuclear power, and the challenge is to make it safe.”
