= Guido Pontecorvo =

Scottish geneticist

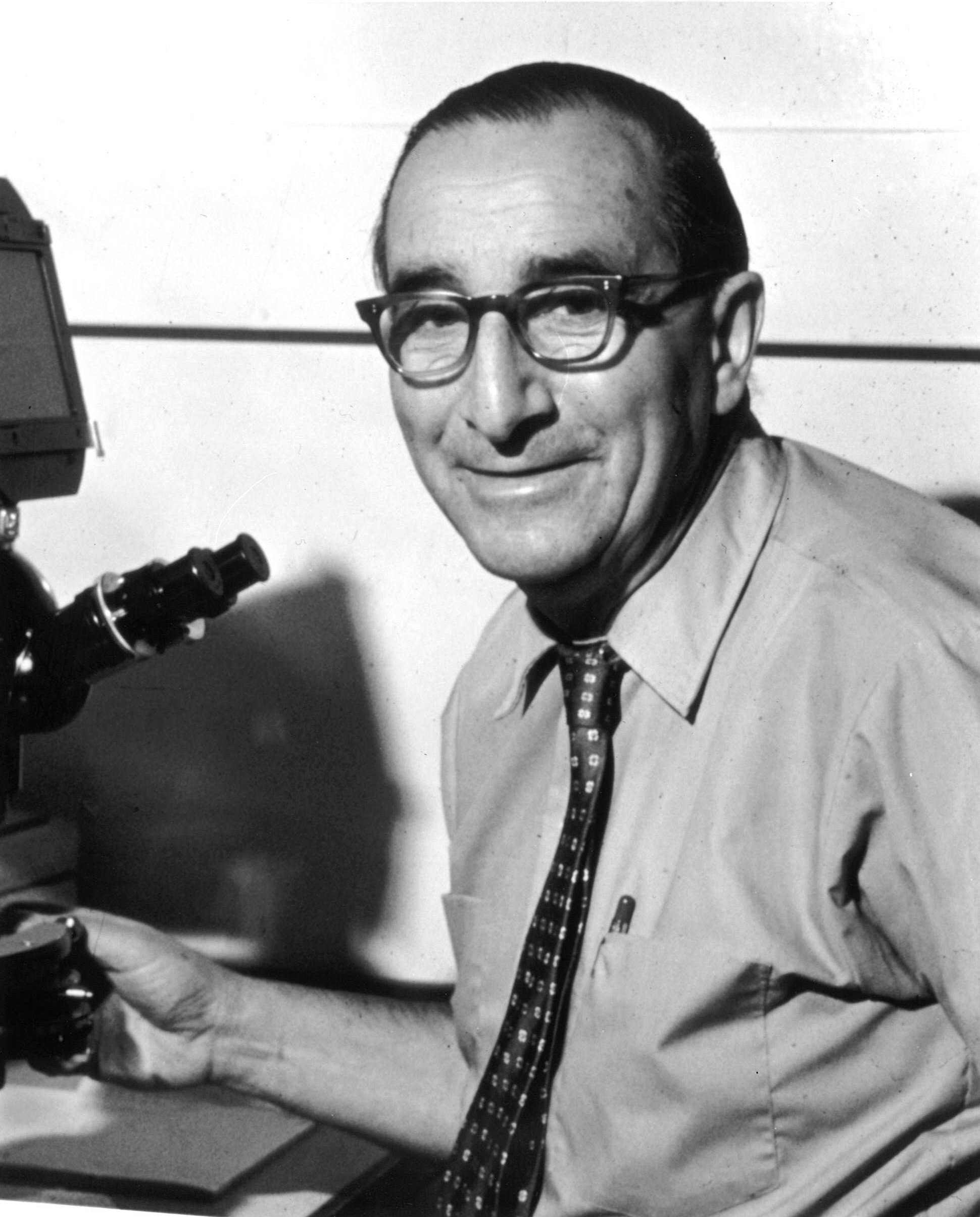
- Guido Pontecorvo, from his years at the Imperial Cancer Research Fund, 1968-80
- Born: 29 November 1907; Pisa, Italy
- Died: 25 September 1999 (aged 91)
- Citizenship: Italy, United Kingdom
- Relatives: Gillo Pontecorvo (brother); Bruno Pontecorvo (brother); Marco Pontecorvo (nephew)
- Awards: Mendel Medal (1979)
- Scientific career
- Fields: Genetics
- Workplaces: University of Glasgow, Imperial Cancer Research Fund
- Doctoral students: Obaid Siddiqi

Guido Pellegrino Arrigo Pontecorvo FRS FRSE (29 November 1907 – 25 September 1999) was an Italian-born Scottish geneticist.

== Life ==
Guido Pontecorvo was born on 29 November 1907 in Pisa into a family of wealthy Italian industrialists. He was one of eight children. He was a brother to Gillo Pontecorvo and Bruno Pontecorvo.

He was dismissed from his post in Florence in 1938, due to his Jewish heritage. He then fled to Britain in 1939 with his new wife Leonore Freyenmuth (of German descent).

- Institute of Animal Genetics, University of Edinburgh. 1938–40 and 1944–45
- Department of Zoology, University of Glasgow, 1941–44
- Dept of Genetics, University of Glasgow, 1945–68 (Professor 1956–68)
- Honorary Director, MRC Unit of Cell Genetics, 1966–68
- Member of research staff, Imperial Cancer Research Fund, 1968–75
- Honorary Consultant Geneticist, ICRF, 1975–80

In 1946 he was elected a Fellow of the Royal Society of Edinburgh. His proposers were Alan William Greenwood, John Walton, Hugh Donald and James E. Nichols. He was elected a Fellow of the Royal Society in 1955.

Pontecorvo lived and worked in London following his retirement from the University of Glasgow in 1968. He died in Saint-Luc, Switzerland, on 25 September 1999 while on holiday, and is buried there with his wife and his daughter.

== Legacy ==
The Institute of Genetics building at the University of Glasgow was renamed as the Pontecorvo Building in 1995 in honour of Guido Pontecorvo and to celebrate 50 years of the institute in Glasgow. The Pontecorvo Building is part of the Anderson College complex located on Dumbarton Road in the West End of Glasgow. The building has been vacant since 2011 awaiting redevelopment. Until then it housed one of the few still operational paternoster elevators in the UK.

He has also lent his name to the annual Pontecorvo Award, presented to the final year undergraduate student in the department with the highest grades.
