= Elena Freda =

Italian mathematician and mathematical physicist

Elena Freda (25 March 1890 – 25 November 1978) was an Italian mathematician and mathematical physicist known for her collaboration with Vito Volterra on mathematical analysis and its applications to electromagnetism and biomathematics.

== Life ==
Freda was born on 25 March 1890. She studied projective geometry with Guido Castelnuovo at the Sapienza University of Rome, graduating in 1912, but then shifted her interests to mathematical physics, working with Orso Mario Corbino and earning a second degree in physics from Sapienza University in 1915. Her earliest documented connection to Vito Volterra is also from 1915, in the form of a letter from Freda to Volterra with the date 23 September 1915, describing her work.

Italy entered World War I in 1915, on the side of the Allied Powers. This was something that Volterra had strongly advocated, and he enlisted for the war effort, bringing with him students including Freda to assist him in ballistics calculations. A letter from her to Volterra from 1915 discusses the difficulties of spending days on calculations on "millimetered paper".

After the war, Freda earned a habilitation (libera docenza) in physics in 1918, and was appointed as a docent in mathematical physics at Sapienza University in 1919; her habilitation was confirmed in 1929. She taught courses in mathematical physics and rational mechanics at the University of Messina in 1923–1924, but then, with uncertain continued career prospects in Messina, returned to Rome. She taught there for the rest of her career until retiring from teaching in 1959, under the mandatory retirement rules then in place. She died on 25 November 1978 in Rome.

== Research ==
Freda's initial publications were in projective geometry, but by 1915 her interests had already begun shifting to mathematical analysis and mathematical physics, with one publication on Euler's homogeneous function theorem and another applying mathematical analysis to study Corbino's experimental work in electromagnetics. She continued publishing works on the analysis of electromagnetics into the 1920s. Her early work in analysis was already inspired by Volterra, who presented one of her results to the Accademia dei Lincei in 1916, and a 1921 paper was coauthored with Volterra. She also collaborated in this period with Nella Mortara, another female Italian physicist.

Her work in mathematical biology, again inspired by Volterra and his work in population dynamics, began in 1927 and in 1931 she published a review of Volterra's work in this area. Her work through the 1930s returned to more purely mathematical studies in analysis. This period includes what has been described as her "greatest work", Méthode des caractéristiques pour intégration des équations aux dérivées partielles linéaires hyperboliques, a 1937 publication in French (under the name Hélène Freda) on the solution of second-order hyperbolic partial differential equations, based on a course of study she gave beginning in 1931, with a preface by Volterra.
