= Via Panisperna boys =

Group of scientists

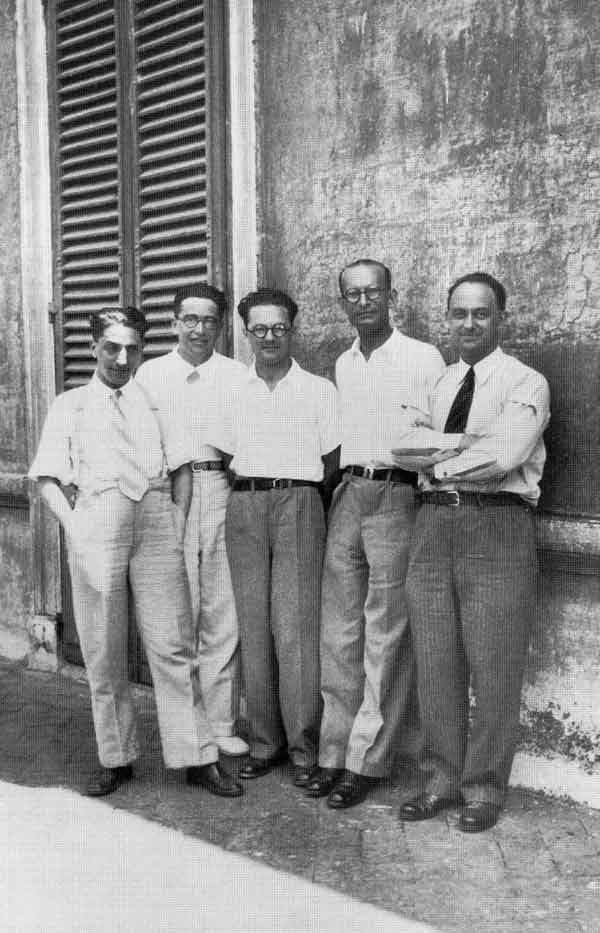
Enrico Fermi with four of the Via Panisperna boys in the courtyard of Rome University's Physics Institute in Via Panisperna, about 1934. From left to right: Oscar D'Agostino, Emilio Segrè, Edoardo Amaldi, Franco Rasetti and Enrico Fermi

Via Panisperna boys (Italian: i ragazzi di Via Panisperna) is the name given to a group of young Italian scientists led by Enrico Fermi, who worked at the Royal Physics Institute of the University of Rome La Sapienza and made the famous discovery of slow neutrons in 1934. This later enabled development of the nuclear reactor and construction of the first atomic bomb.

The members of the group were Enrico Fermi, Edoardo Amaldi, Oscar D'Agostino, Ettore Majorana, Bruno Pontecorvo, Franco Rasetti and Emilio Segrè. All were physicists, except for D'Agostino, who was a chemist. Their collective nickname comes from the address of the Royal Physics Institute, located in the street Via Panisperna in the city district Rione Monti. The street was named after a nearby monastery, San Lorenzo in Panisperna.

== The growth of the group ==
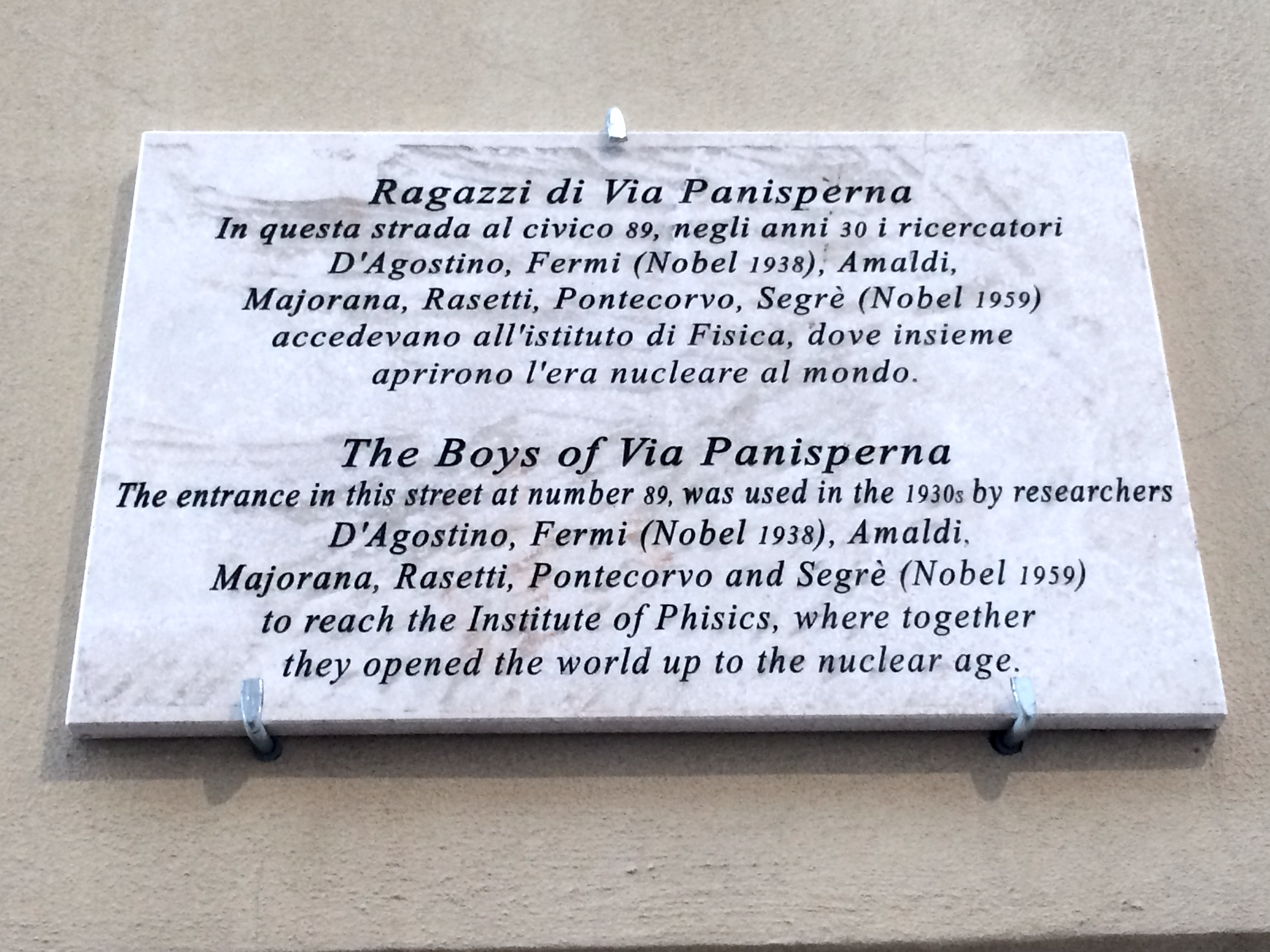
Commemorative plaque

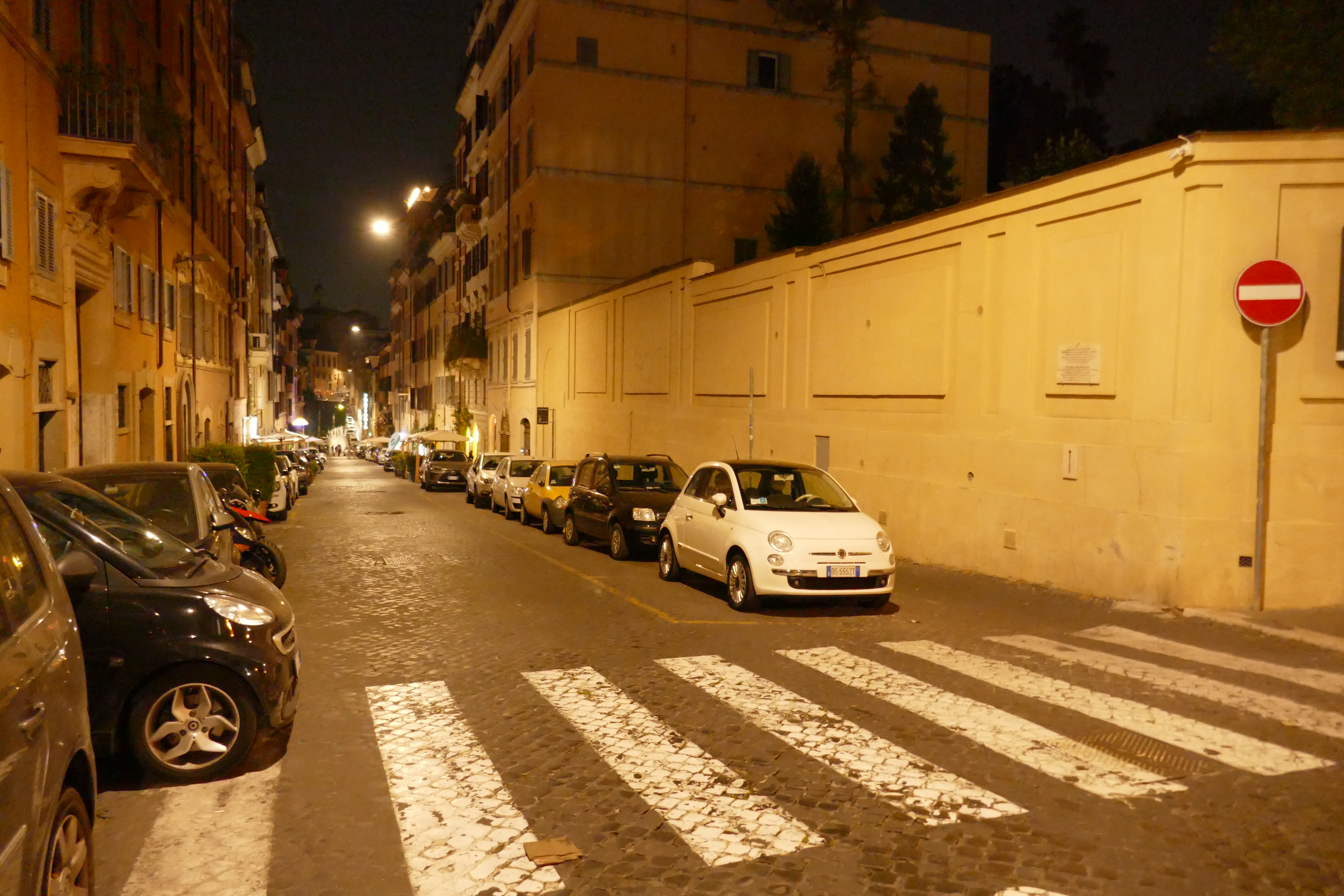
The Via Panisperna in 2021; the plaque hangs to the left of the traffic sign; it refers to an entrance to the building seen side-on; behind the wall lay the Institute's garden

The group grew under the supervision of the physicist, minister, senator and director of the Institute of Physics Orso Mario Corbino. Corbino recognized the qualities of Enrico Fermi and led the commission which appointed him in 1926 to one of the first three professorships in Theoretical Physics in Italy. From 1929, Fermi and Corbino dedicated themselves to the transformation of the institute into a modern research centre.

Franco Rasetti and Fermi were contemporaries, who had met as undergraduates at Pisa, and worked together in Florence. The first of the Boys to join them was Emilio Segrè, who had been studying engineering. Segrè had got to know Rasetti through mountaineering and been drawn into physics by their gatecrashing the 1927 Como Conference together.

As a schoolboy, Edoardo Amaldi had known Fermi through his father, a mathematician; the families had hiked together in the Dolomites. Later the director Corbino encouraged Amaldi as a young engineering student to switch to physics. Ettore Majorana had also been an engineering student; he switched to physics after his mathematical ability was recognised by Segrè, who helped him gain an interview with Fermi. Oscar D'Agostino became involved because he was a chemist; he had been the assistant to Giulio Trabacchi, with whom the group collaborated because he had a supply of radium. Pontecorvo joined the group later (1934); he came to Rome as a postgraduate to work with Rasetti, a family friend.

== Research ==
The first version of their research laboratory was dedicated chiefly to atomic and molecular spectroscopy. Later they moved towards experimental studies of the atomic nucleus. Research included the bombarding of various elements with neutrons, generated by irradiating beryllium with alpha particles emitted by the radioactive gas radon, obtained from radium. The neutrons induced reactions in the target's nuclei, resulting in the generation of other elements, often radioactive isotopes.

A key discovery, partly by chance, was that neutrons slowed down by hydrogen nuclei were far more likely to be captured by the nuclei. Five of the Boys patented this idea, which was crucial in harnessing nuclear power. Their long-delayed financial reward was modest. On the theoretical side, the work of Ettore Majorana and Fermi advanced the understanding of the structure of the atomic nucleus and the forces acting within it. In 1933 and 1934 they published the fundamental theory of beta decay.

The work on neutron-induced radioactivity involved a degree of cooperation unusual at the time, and the later papers had five authors. The roles were not strictly delineated, but D'Agostino was the specialist chemist, Amaldi was responsible for the electronics, and Segrè obtained the elements to be irradiated. The working atmosphere involved a camaraderie and playfulness exemplified by the nicknames bestowed on one another. Fermi was "Il Papa" (the Pope), because of his infallibility. Rasetti, his right-hand man, was "Cardinal Vicario". Even higher in this ecclesiastical hierarchy, the nickname of Corbino was "Padreterno" (God Almighty), for his ability to miraculously generate funds and positions. Majorana was "Il Gran Inquisitore" (The Grand Inquisitor), because of his critical manner. Segrè's judgemental disposition earned him the nickname "Basilisco" after the legendary Basilisk. Amaldi was "Fanciulletto" (young boy) because of his cherubic face. Pontecorvo was "Cucciolo" (puppy dog). Another key component of the collaborative atmosphere was the masterful impromptu talks that Fermi delivered every afternoon on topics of interest to their research.

== The group disperses ==
By 1935 the group had dispersed and only Fermi and Amaldi continued work together: Rasetti was away for a year in the U.S.; Segrè had a professorship in Palermo, D'Agostino had a job elsewhere in Rome, and Pontecorvo was in Paris. Majorana had become reclusive and in 1938 would disappear in unexplained circumstances.

Subsequently, the Italian racial laws that targeted people of Jewish descent caused further emigration. (Segrè and Pontecorvo were Jewish, as was Fermi's wife.) On 6 December 1938, Fermi left Rome with his family for Stockholm to receive the Nobel Prize. From there, they emigrated permanently to the U.S. D'Agostino and Amaldi were the only ones who remained in Italy.

After the war, Fermi's and Segrè's involvement in the development of the atomic bomb may have caused some strain in their relations with Rasetti, who had refused to participate. They were limited in discussing nuclear physics with their former colleagues because the new discoveries often remained classified.

== In the media ==
The film director Gianni Amelio told their story in a TV movie which was enlarged as a film, I ragazzi di via Panisperna (1989).

The building in Via Panisperna, situated on the Viminale hill, is within the complex of the Ministry of the Interior. It now houses the Enrico Fermi Museum (CREF) devoted to the history of nuclear physics.
