= Ugo Amaldi (mathematician) =

Italian mathematician (1875–1957)

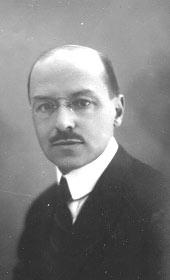
- Born: 18 April 1875; Verona, Italy
- Died: 11 November 1957 (aged 82); Rome, Italy
- Education: University of Bologna
- Scientific career
- Fields: Mathematics

Ugo Amaldi (18 April 1875 – 11 November 1957) was an Italian mathematician. He contributed to the field of analytic geometry and worked on Lie groups. His son Edoardo was a physicist.

== Biography ==
He graduated in mathematics (21 November 1898) at the University of Bologna under the guidance of S. Pincherle. He taught at the University of Cagliari (1903-1905), Modena (1905-1919), Padova (1919-1924), Roma (1924-1950).
