= Moskultprog =

Moskultprog (since 1997) is a production center of cultural initiatives mostly in Russia and Europe, founded by historian Sergey Nikitin. The center is well known for the public non-commercial open-air events on historical, sociourbanistic and natural subjects, which feature comments of the leading experts in these fields like Valentin Yanin, Andrey Zaliznyak, Natalia Dushkina, Alexey Muratov, Maria Makogonova, and many others.

Moskultprog presents recent and interesting urban studies with the help of their authors as guides. Moskultprog's events are commonly known as progulki (walks) and normally attract around 150-200 people, for their character they are sometimes described as the "biggest scientific seminar in the world".

Since 2007, Sergey Nikitin and Moskultprog have sponsored Moscow Velonight (Московская Велоночь, Velonotte Mosca, a sort of open-air night lecture with hundreds of followers by bike.

Moskultprog also produces architecture and urbanistic exhibitions, among them - "Elements of Tverskaya" (Arch Moscow-2008), "Leonidov 2" (for the 1st edition of the Moscow Architecture Biennale), demonstrating recently discovered work of Ivan Leonidov.
