= Edoardo Amaldi =

Italian physicist (1908–1989)

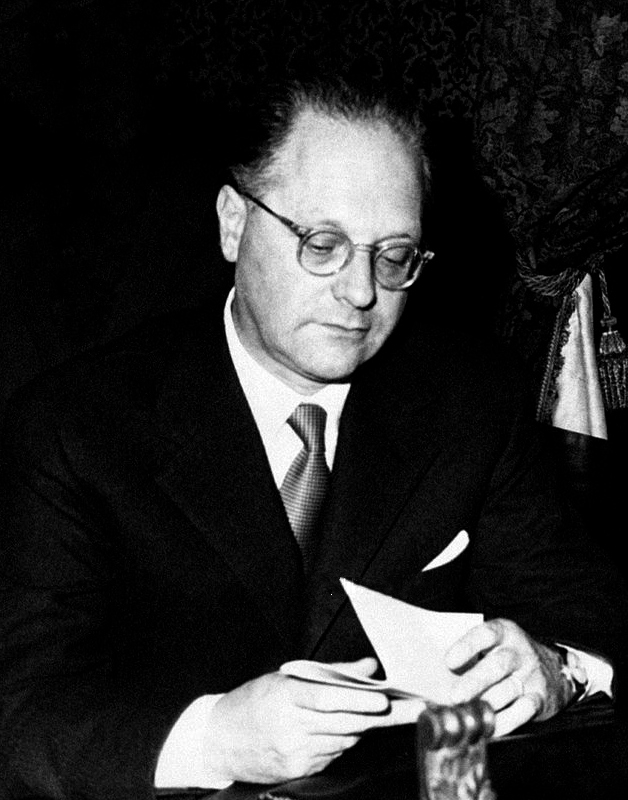
- Amaldi in 1960
- Born: 5 September 1908; Carpaneto Piacentino, Kingdom of Italy
- Died: 5 December 1989 (aged 81); Rome, Italy
- Education: Sapienza University of Rome
- Known for: neutrino
- Spouse: Ginestra Amaldi
- Scientific career
- Fields: Nuclear physics
- Workplaces: Sapienza University of Rome; CERN

Edoardo Amaldi (5 September 1908 – 5 December 1989) was an Italian physicist. He coined the term "neutrino" in conversations with Enrico Fermi distinguishing it from the heavier "neutron". He has been described as "one of the leading nuclear physicists of the twentieth century." He was involved in the anti-nuclear peace movement.

== Life and career ==
Amaldi was born in Carpaneto Piacentino, the son of Ugo Amaldi, professor of mathematics at the University of Padua, and Luisa Basini.

Amaldi graduated under the supervision of Enrico Fermi and was his main collaborator until 1938. His wife Ginestra was a friend of Laura Fermi; together they wrote Alchimia del Tempo Nostro (1936), interpreting their husbands' work as contemporary alchemy. In 1939, Amaldi was drafted into the Royal Italian Army and returned to physics in 1941.

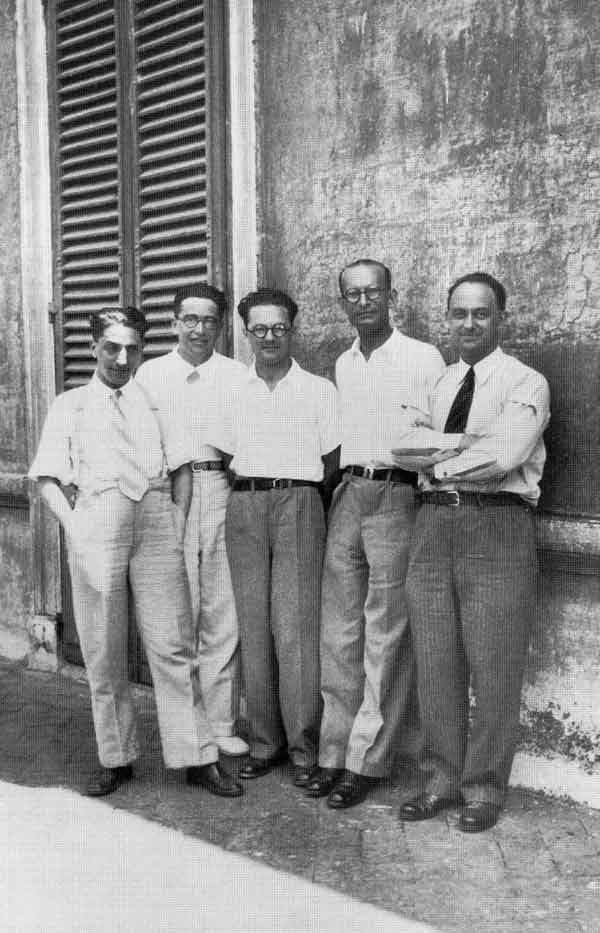
The Via Panisperna boys, including Amaldi (center), circa 1934

After WWII, Amaldi held the chair of "General Physics" at the Sapienza University of Rome, rebuilt the post-Fermi school of physics, and was the co-founder of the Italian National Institute for Nuclear Physics and of ESRO. He was the general secretary of CERN at its early stages when operations were still provisional, before September's 1954 official foundation. He pioneered in Europe the search for gravitational waves.

His main scientific results were on slow neutrons in the Fermi group, and the evidence for antiproton annihilations with emulsion techniques, somewhat contemporary to its production in accelerators by Emilio Segrè and collaborators. Amaldi co-authored about 200 scientific publications ranging from atomic spectroscopy and nuclear physics to elementary particle physics and experimental gravitation, as well as textbooks for secondary schools and universities. He also wrote historical-scientific books; for example, a biography of his friend Ettore Majorana who mysteriously disappeared. He was elected a Foreign Honorary Member of the Soviet Academy of Sciences in 1958, an International Member of the American Philosophical Society in 1961, and both the American Academy of Arts and Sciences and the United States National Academy of Sciences in 1962. In 1963 he became foreign member of the Royal Netherlands Academy of Arts and Sciences. On 25 April 1968, he was elected as a Foreign Member of the Royal Society.

Amaldi died unexpectedly on 5 December 1989, still in full activity, while he was president of the Accademia dei Lincei, of which he had been a member since 1948.

The third Automated Transfer Vehicle of the European Space Agency bore his name, so does a square on the CERN site in Meyrin.

== See also ==
- Via Panisperna boys
- I ragazzi di via Panisperna (movie)
- Nuclear power in Italy
