= Oscar D'Agostino =

Italian chemist

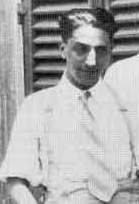
- in the courtyard of Rome University's Physics Institute in Via Panisperna, c.1930.
- Born: 29 August 1901; Avellino, Italy
- Died: 16 March 1975 (aged 73); Rome, Italy
- Known for: New radioactive elements produced by neutron irradiation
- Scientific career
- Fields: Chemistry
- Workplaces: University of Rome, Curie Institute (Paris), Consiglio Nazionale delle Ricerche, Istituto Superiore di Sanità

Oscar D'Agostino (29 August 1901 – 16 March 1975) was an Italian chemist and one of the so-called Via Panisperna boys, the group of young scientists led by Enrico Fermi: all of them were physicists, except for D'Agostino, who was a chemist.

In 1934, he contributed to Fermi's experiment (that gave Fermi the possibility to win the Nobel Prize in 1938) to show the properties of slow neutrons. That led the way to the discovery of nuclear fission, and later on to the construction of the first atomic bomb.

== Bibliography ==
- (in Italian) O. D'Agostino: Il chimico dei fantasmi. Mephite, 2002

== See also ==
- Radioactive decay
- Nuclear chain reaction
- Slow neutron
- Via Panisperna boys
- Enrico Fermi
