= Laura Fermi =

Italian-American political activist (1907–1977)

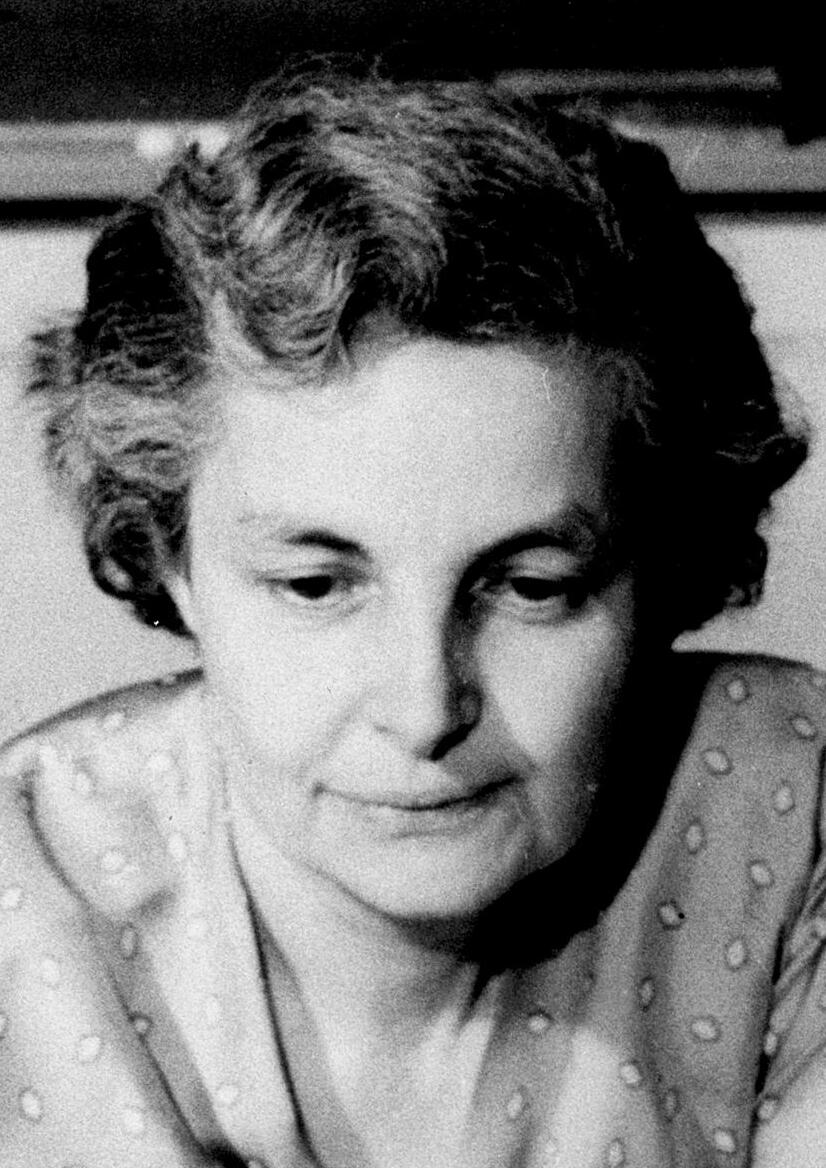

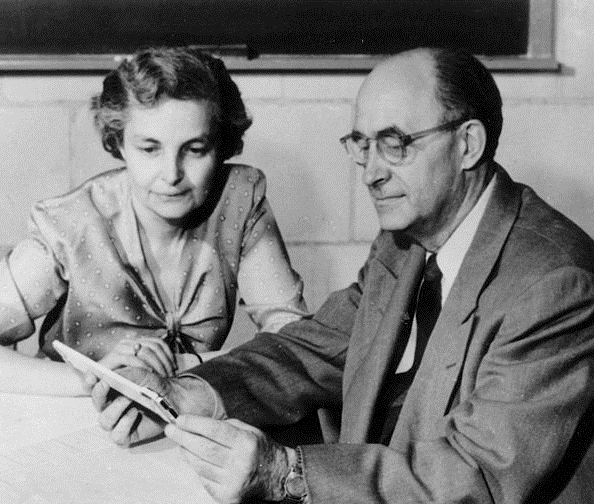
Laura and Enrico Fermi at the Institute for Nuclear Studies, Los Alamos, 1954

Laura Capon Fermi (16 June 1907 – 26 December 1977) was an Italian and naturalized American writer and political activist. She was the wife of Nobel Prize physicist Enrico Fermi.

== Biography ==
Lalla "Laura" Capon was born in Rome in 1907 as the second child of Admiral Augusto Capon (Venice, 3 November 1872 – Auschwitz, 23 October 1943) and Costanza Romanelli (1880 – before 1943). She had an elder and a younger sister and a younger brother. Capon met Enrico Fermi while she was a student in general science at the University of Rome. They married in 1928.

They had two children: a daughter, Nella (1931–1995), and a son, Giulio (1936–1997), named after Enrico's older brother, who had died in 1915. When their daughter Nella began to move around on her own, Laura Fermi thought that her housekeeper's assistance was more than enough, and that her days were a little empty. Since her husband got tired of looking for translations for her at publishing houses, he asked her why she didn't start writing a real book. Taking advantage of the physics knowledge of her friend Ginestra Amaldi, she and Amaldi decided to write a book relating alchemy and the nuclear transmutation, which was published by a publishing house in Milan.

In 1938, the Fermis emigrated to the United States to escape the anti-Jewish laws of the Fascist government of Benito Mussolini; Laura was Jewish. They traveled to Stockholm to receive Fermi's Nobel Prize, and left from Stockholm for the United States, where Fermi had accepted a position at Columbia University. They were naturalized as Americans in 1944.

In 1954 Laura resumed writing. Her book Atoms in the Family, about her life with Enrico, appeared shortly before he died of stomach cancer.

In August 1955 Laura traveled to Geneva for the International Conference for the Peaceful Use of Atomic Energy which led to the International Atomic Energy Agency. Laura Fermi was the Official Historian of the Conference and published Atoms for the World, reporting on its proceedings.

Her book Illustrious Immigrants was about "Many of Europe's most intelligent and best-trained men and women, who immediately became visible to middle class America as neighbors, teachers and colleagues" in the years 1930 to 1941. They were

men and women who came to America fully made, so to speak, with their PhD's and diplomas from art academies or music conservatories in their pockets, and who continued to engage in intellectual pursuits in this country. Their numbers and the high stature of many of them make them a unique phenomenon.

She noted, "Life was initially hard for many physicians, but it was the lawyers whose training proved least exportable and who most frequently had to find a new means of livelihood." Considering the extent of the influence of the immigrants, an evaluation of the impact of the migration is restricted to two fields: psychoanalysis and nuclear science.

Laura Fermi died of cardiac arrest in 1977.

== Published works ==
- 1936: (with Ginestra Amaldi) Alchimia del Tempo Nostro (Italian)
- 1954: Atoms in the Family: My Life with Enrico Fermi, University of Chicago Press ISBN 0-88318-524-5
- 1957: Atoms for the World: United States participation in the Conference on the Peaceful uses of Atomic Energy, University of Chicago Press, ISBN 0-88318-524-5
- 1961: Mussolini, University of Chicago Press ISBN 0226243753
- 1961: The Story of Atomic Energy, Random House LCCN 61-7589 OCLC 1406822
- 1961: (with Gilberto Bernardini) Galileo and the Scientific Revolution, Basic Books ISBN 0-486-43226-2
- 1968: Illustrious Immigrants: The Intellectual Migration from Europe 1930–41, University of Chicago Press, ISBN 0-226-24378-8 via Internet Archive
