= Chemistry World =

Trade magazine

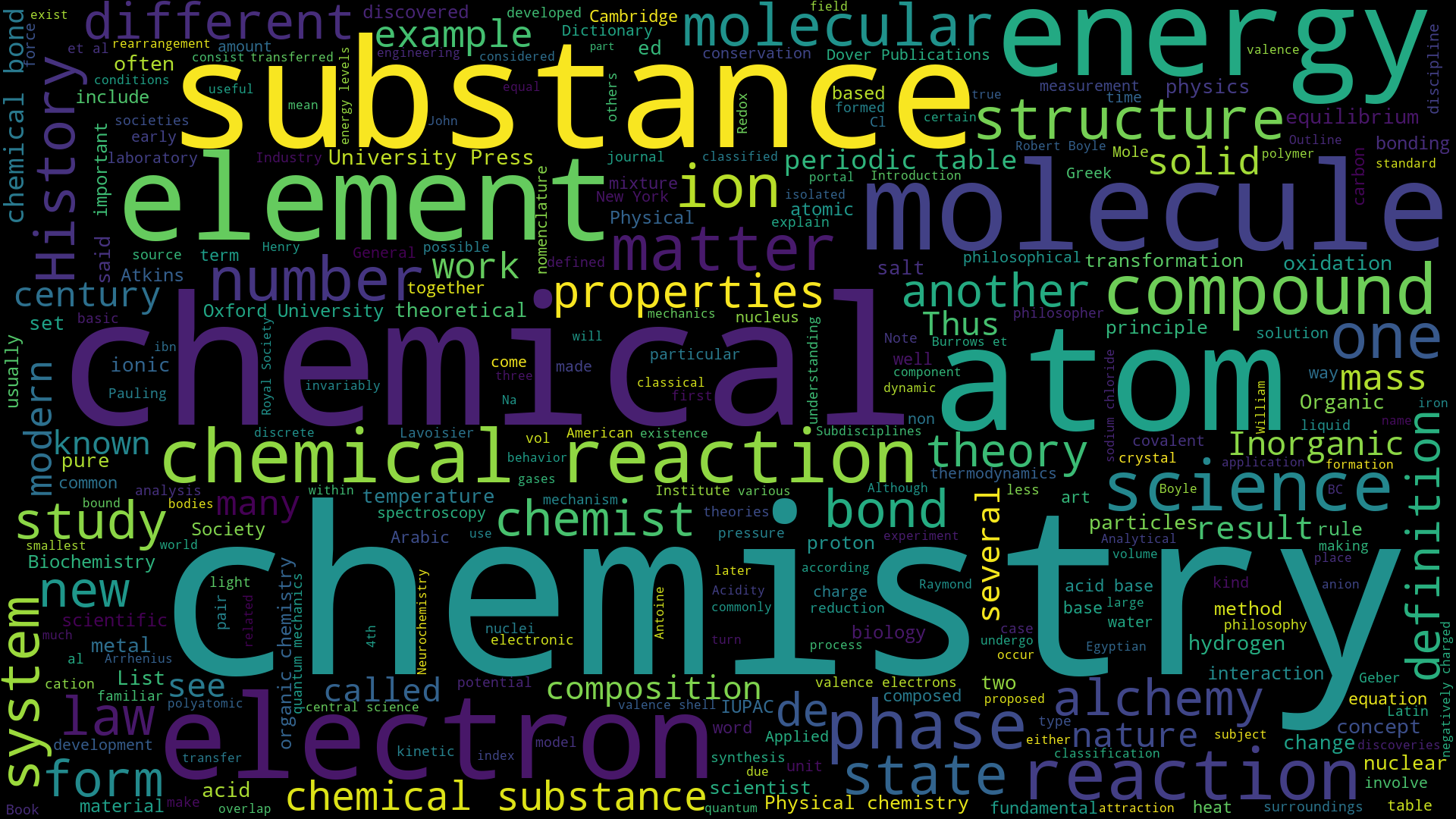

- Front cover, january 2017: Yuri Oganessian
- Editor: Philip Robinson
- Former editors: Bibiana Campos-Seijo
- Categories: Chemistry, Technology, Economy
- Frequency: Bimonthly
- Publisher: Royal Society of Chemistry
- First issue: January 2004
- Country: United Kingdom
- Based in: London, England
- Website: www.chemistryworld.com
- ISSN: 1473-7604

Chemistry World is a bimonthly chemistry news magazine published by the Royal Society of Chemistry. The magazine addresses current events in the world of chemistry including research, international business news and government policy as it affects the chemical science community, plus the best product applications. It features regular columns by Philip Ball, Derek Lowe, Andrea Sella, Raychelle Burks, Alice Motion and Vanessa Seifert. The magazine is sent to all members of the Royal Society of Chemistry and is included in the cost of membership. In August 2016, the magazine began offering a "soft" paywall option, where a limited amount of content is made available free to all unregistered readers.

== History ==
In 1965 two British chemistry institutions, the Chemical Society and the Royal Institute of Chemistry agreed to merge their primary publications Proceedings of the Chemical Society and the Journal of the Royal Institute of Chemistry. This was a first step to merger of the institutions. The new journal was entitled Chemistry in Britain.

In January 2004 it was given its current title. The publication's stated reason for the change was "to acknowledge the international nature of the subject".

According to the Journal Citation Reports, the journal has a 2011 impact factor of 0.159, ranking it 146th out of 154 journals in the category "Chemistry, Multidisciplinary".

Starting with the January 2026 issue it became bimonthly, on alternate months. It has a companion website with additional stories.
