= List of chemical elements named after people =

This list of chemical elements named after people includes elements named for people both directly and indirectly. Of the 118 elements, 19 are connected with the names of 20 people. 15 elements were named to honor 16 scientists (as curium honours both Marie and Pierre Curie). Four others have indirect connection to the names of non-scientists. Only gadolinium and samarium occur in nature; the rest are man-made.

== List ==
These 19 elements are connected to the names of people. Seaborg and Oganessian were the only living persons honored by having elements named after them; Oganessian is the only one still alive. Names were proposed to honor Einstein and Fermi while they were still alive, but they had both died by the time those names became official.

The four elements associated with non-scientists were not named in their honor but named for something else bearing their name: samarium for the mineral samarskite from which it was isolated; and americium, berkelium and livermorium after places named for them. The cities of Berkeley, California and Livermore, California are the locations of the University of California Radiation Laboratory and Lawrence Livermore National Laboratory, respectively.

Six elements have only an indirect namesake: samarium, gadolinium, americium, berkelium, flerovium, and livermorium were each named for a mineral or place that were themselves named for people.

Element				Individual(s)				
Z	Name	Symbol	Discovery	Immediate namesake	Name	Specialty	Born–Died	Nationality
62	Samarium	Sm	1879	the mineral samarskite	Vasili Samarsky-Bykhovets	Mining engineer	1803–1870	Russian
64	Gadolinium	Gd	1886	the mineral gadolinite	Johan Gadolin	Scientist	1760–1852	Finnish
95	Americium	Am	1944	the continents of the Americas	Amerigo Vespucci	Explorer	1454–1512	Italian
96	Curium	Cm	1944		Marie Curie	Scientist	1867–1934	Polish–French
96	Curium	Cm	1944		Pierre Curie	Scientist	1859–1906	French
97	Berkelium	Bk	1949	Berkeley, California and Lawrence Berkeley National Laboratory	George Berkeley	Philosopher	1685–1753	Irish
99	Einsteinium	Es	1952		Albert Einstein	Scientist	1879–1955	German–Swiss
100	Fermium	Fm	1953		Enrico Fermi	Scientist	1901–1954	Italian–American
101	Mendelevium	Md	1955		Dmitri Mendeleev	Scientist	1834–1907	Russian
102	Nobelium	No	1966		Alfred Nobel	Scientist	1833–1896	Swedish
103	Lawrencium	Lr	1961		Ernest Lawrence	Scientist	1901–1958	American
104	Rutherfordium	Rf	1969		Ernest Rutherford	Scientist	1871–1937	New Zealand
106	Seaborgium	Sg	1974		Glenn T. Seaborg	Scientist	1912–1999	American
107	Bohrium	Bh	1981		Niels Bohr	Scientist	1885–1962	Danish
109	Meitnerium	Mt	1982		Lise Meitner	Scientist	1878–1968	Austrian–Swedish
111	Roentgenium	Rg	1994		Wilhelm Röntgen	Scientist	1845–1923	German
112	Copernicium	Cn	1996		Nicolaus Copernicus	Scientist	1473–1543	Polish–German
114	Flerovium	Fl	1999	the Flerov Laboratory of Nuclear Reactions at the Joint Institute for Nuclear Research	Georgy Flyorov	Scientist	1913–1990	Russian
116	Livermorium	Lv	2000	Livermore, California, and Lawrence Livermore Lab	Robert Livermore	Land owner	1799–1858	English–Mexican
118	Oganesson	Og	2002		Yuri Oganessian	Scientist	1933–	Russian-Armenian

== Other connections ==
Other element names connected with people (real or mythological) have been proposed but failed to gain official international recognition. The following such names received past significant use among scientists:

- cassiopeium after the constellation Cassiopeia, hence indirectly connected to the mythological Cassiopeia (now lutetium);
- columbium after Christopher Columbus (now niobium);
- hahnium after Otto Hahn (now dubnium, also later proposed for what is now hassium);
- joliotium after Irène Joliot-Curie (now nobelium, also later proposed for what is now dubnium);
- kurchatovium after Igor Kurchatov (now rutherfordium);

Names had also been suggested (but not used) to honour Henri Becquerel (becquerelium) and Paul Langevin (langevinium). George Gamow, Lev Landau, and Vitalii Goldanski (who was alive at the time) were suggested for consideration for honoring with elements during the Transfermium Wars, but were not actually proposed.

(See the article on element naming controversies and List of chemical elements named after places.)

Also, mythological entities have had a significant impact on the naming of elements. Helium, titanium, selenium, palladium, promethium, cerium, europium, tantalum, mercury, thorium, uranium, neptunium and plutonium are all given names connected to mythological characters. With some, that connection is indirect:

- helium: named for the Sun where it was discovered by spectral analysis, being associated with the deity Helios,
- iridium: named for the Greek goddess Iris,
- tellurium: named for the Roman goddess of the earth, Tellus Mater,
- niobium: named for Niobe, a character of Greek mythology,
- vanadium: named for Vanadis, another name for Norse goddess Freyja,
- selenium: named for the Moon being associated with the deity Selene,
- palladium: named for the then-recently discovered asteroid Pallas which had been named for the deity Pallas Athena,
- cerium: named for the then-recently discovered asteroid Ceres which had been named for the deity Ceres,
- europium: named for the continent that had been named after Europa.

Titanium is unique in that it refers to a group of deities rather than any particular individual. So Helios, Selene, Pallas, and Prometheus actually have two elements named in their honor.

And for elements given a name connected with a group, there is also xenon, named for the Greek word ξένον (xenon), neuter singular form of ξένος (xenos), meaning 'foreign(er)', 'strange(r)', or 'guest'. Its discoverer William Ramsay intended this name to be an indication of the qualities of this element in analogy to the generic group of people.

Gallium was discovered by French scientist Paul-Émile Lecoq de Boisbaudran, who named it in honor of France ("Gallia" in Latin); allegations were later made that he had also named it for himself, as "gallus" is Latin for "le coq", but he denied that this had been his intention.

== See also ==
- List of scientists whose names are used as units
- List of scientists whose names are used in physical constants
- List of chemical elements named after places
- List of chemical element name etymologies
- Naming of chemical elements
- List of chemical elements
