= Naming of chemical elements =

Chemical elements may be named from various sources: sometimes based on the person who discovered it, or the place it was discovered. Some have Latin or Greek roots deriving from something related to the element, for example some use to which it may have been put.

== Known elements ==
All 118 discovered elements are confirmed and have a formal name and symbol, as decided by IUPAC. The last four names and symbols were added on November 28, 2016. Currently there are no unconfirmed discoveries and all seven periods (rows) of the periodic table are completed.

Periodic table

Group	1	2		3	4	5	6	7	8	9	10	11	12	13	14	15	16	17	18
	Hydrogen & alkali metals	Alkaline earth metals												Triels	Tetrels	Pnictogens	Chalcogens	Halogens	Noble gases
Period 1	Hydrogen1H1.0080																		Helium2He4.0026
2	Lithium3Li6.94	Beryllium4Be9.0122												Boron5B10.81	Carbon6C12.011	Nitrogen7N14.007	Oxygen8O15.999	Fluorine9F18.998	Neon10Ne20.180
3	Sodium11Na22.990	Magnesium12Mg24.305												Aluminium13Al26.982	Silicon14Si28.085	Phosphorus15P30.974	Sulfur16S32.06	Chlorine17Cl35.45	Argon18Ar39.95
4	Potassium19K39.098	Calcium20Ca40.078		Scandium21Sc44.956	Titanium22Ti47.867	Vanadium23V50.942	Chromium24Cr51.996	Manganese25Mn54.938	Iron26Fe55.845	Cobalt27Co58.933	Nickel28Ni58.693	Copper29Cu63.546	Zinc30Zn65.38	Gallium31Ga69.723	Germanium32Ge72.630	Arsenic33As74.922	Selenium34Se78.971	Bromine35Br79.904	Krypton36Kr83.798
5	Rubidium37Rb85.468	Strontium38Sr87.62		Yttrium39Y88.906	Zirconium40Zr91.224	Niobium41Nb92.906	Molybdenum42Mo95.95	Technetium43Tc[97]	Ruthenium44Ru101.07	Rhodium45Rh102.91	Palladium46Pd106.42	Silver47Ag107.87	Cadmium48Cd112.41	Indium49In114.82	Tin50Sn118.71	Antimony51Sb121.76	Tellurium52Te127.60	Iodine53I126.90	Xenon54Xe131.29
6	Caesium55Cs132.91	Barium56Ba137.33	1 asterisk	Lutetium71Lu174.97	Hafnium72Hf178.49	Tantalum73Ta180.95	Tungsten74W183.84	Rhenium75Re186.21	Osmium76Os190.23	Iridium77Ir192.22	Platinum78Pt195.08	Gold79Au196.97	Mercury80Hg200.59	Thallium81Tl204.38	Lead82Pb207.2	Bismuth83Bi208.98	Polonium84Po[209]	Astatine85At[210]	Radon86Rn[222]
7	Francium87Fr[223]	Radium88Ra[226]	1 asterisk	Lawrencium103Lr[266]	Rutherfordium104Rf[267]	Dubnium105Db[268]	Seaborgium106Sg[269]	Bohrium107Bh[270]	Hassium108Hs[271]	Meitnerium109Mt[278]	Darmstadtium110Ds[281]	Roentgenium111Rg[282]	Copernicium112Cn[285]	Nihonium113Nh[286]	Flerovium114Fl[289]	Moscovium115Mc[290]	Livermorium116Lv[293]	Tennessine117Ts[294]	Oganesson118Og[294]
			1 asterisk	Lanthanum57La138.91	Cerium58Ce140.12	Praseodymium59Pr140.91	Neodymium60Nd144.24	Promethium61Pm[145]	Samarium62Sm150.36	Europium63Eu151.96	Gadolinium64Gd157.25	Terbium65Tb158.93	Dysprosium66Dy162.50	Holmium67Ho164.93	Erbium68Er167.26	Thulium69Tm168.93	Ytterbium70Yb173.05
			1 asterisk	Actinium89Ac[227]	Thorium90Th232.04	Protactinium91Pa231.04	Uranium92U238.03	Neptunium93Np[237]	Plutonium94Pu[244]	Americium95Am[243]	Curium96Cm[247]	Berkelium97Bk[247]	Californium98Cf[251]	Einsteinium99Es[252]	Fermium100Fm[257]	Mendelevium101Md[258]	Nobelium102No[259]

Primordial From decay Synthetic Border shows natural occurrence of the element

Standard atomic weight A_{r, std}(E)
- Ca: 40.078 — Abridged value (uncertainty omitted here)
- Po: [209] — mass number of the most stable isotope

s-block	f-block	d-block	p-block

== Etymology ==
Element names can refer to:

- a mythological concept or character (including an astronomical object),
- a mineral or similar substance,
- a place, or geographical region,
- a property of the element, or
- a scientist.

=== People ===
Chemical elements are sometimes named after people, especially the synthetic elements discovered (created) after c. 1940. Very few are named after their discoverers, and only two have been named after living people: the element seaborgium was named after Glenn Seaborg, who was alive at the time of naming in 1997; and in 2016 oganesson was named after Yuri Oganessian (still living as of May 2026).

Many transuranic elements are named after Nobel Prize winners:

- Bohrium (Niels Bohr)
- Curium (Marie and Pierre Curie)
- Einsteinium (Albert Einstein)
- Fermium (Enrico Fermi)
- Lawrencium (Ernest Lawrence)
- Roentgenium (Wilhelm Röntgen)
- Rutherfordium (Ernest Rutherford)
- Seaborgium (Glenn T. Seaborg)

Other transuranic elements are named after scientists who did not receive the prize:

- Copernicium (Nicolaus Copernicus)
- Meitnerium (Lise Meitner)
- Mendelevium (Dmitri Mendeleev)
- Nobelium (Alfred Nobel)
- Oganesson (Yuri Oganessian)

The transuranic element flerovium was named after the Flerov Laboratory of Nuclear Reactions, which in turn was named after Georgy Flyorov. The IUPAC stated that the element was named after the laboratory, not Flyorov, but Yuri Oganessian, who led the team at the laboratory that discovered the element, said that the intention of the naming was to honor Flyorov.

The element samarium is named after Vasili Samarsky-Bykhovets, and gadolinium is indirectly named (via the mineral gadolinite) after Johan Gadolin.

Lecoq de Boisbaudran, who named the element gallium after his native land of France (from Latin Gallia meaning Gaul) denied that the element's naming was for a pun on his own name ("le coq" means "the rooster" in French, as does "gallus" in Latin).

=== Places on earth ===
Some chemical elements are named after places on the planet earth. Elements which are named after currently existing countries and cities are as:

- Polonium, named after Poland
- Francium and gallium, both named after France
- Nihonium, named after Japan
- Germanium was named for Germany
- Beryllium was named after the mineral beryl, whose name may have come from Belur, a city in Karnataka state of India.
- Indium gets its name from the indigo color seen in its spectrum, the Latin indicum meaning "of India", which makes it indirectly named after India.
- Americium was named after the Americas.
- Europium was named after Europe.
- Berkelium was named after American city Berkeley, which is in turn named after the philosopher George Berkeley.
- Tennessine and Californium were named after American states Tennessee and California respectively.
- Dubnium and Moscovium were named after Russia's Dubna and Moscow cities.

Several places in Scandinavia have elements named after them.

- Yttrium, terbium, erbium, and ytterbium are all named for the Swedish village of Ytterby, where their ores were first found.
- Hafnium is named after Hafnia, the Latin name for Danish capital Copenhagen.
- Holmium is named after Holmia, Latin for the Swedish capital Stockholm.
- Scandium comes from the Latin word for Scandinavia.
- Thulium is from the Ancient Greek word for the remote Arctic land that the Romans called ultima Thule.

A number of other elements are named after classical words for various places.

- Ruthenium is from the Latin name for the region including Belarus, Ukraine, and Russia.
- Lutetium is named after Lutetia, the Latin name for Paris.
- Copper's name comes from an Old English word derived from the Latin name for the island of Cyprus.
- The names of both magnesium and manganese derive from the Greek region of Magnesia.

=== Astronomical objects ===
The naming of elements from astronomical objects stems from the ancient association of metals with the various planets and their gods, as follows: mercury with Mercury; copper with Venus; iron with Mars (named for the Roman god of war); tin with Jupiter (named for the Roman king of the gods); and lead with Saturn (named for the ancient, slow god who was the father of Jupiter). The Sun and the Moon were associated with gold and silver, respectively.

A few other elements are directly named for astronomical bodies, including planets, dwarf planets, asteroids, the Earth, the Sun, and the Moon. Uranium, neptunium, plutonium, cerium, and palladium were named after Uranus, Neptune, Pluto, Ceres, and Pallas, respectively. The name selenium comes from the Greek word for the Moon (Σελήνη, Selene). Similarly, the name helium is derived from the Greek word for the Sun (Ἢλιος, Helios), as the first evidence for helium came in the form of distinctive emission lines from the Sun that were not explainable by any of the known elements in the 1870s. Tellurium is named after the Latin word tellus, meaning "earth".

=== Minerals ===
Many elements are named after the minerals in which they are found, e.g. calcium after Latin calx (lime), silicon is named after Latin silex (sand), sodium after soda and potassium after potash.

=== Temporary names ===
In 1979, IUPAC published recommendations for their systematic element names to be used for yet unnamed or undiscovered elements as a placeholder, until the discovery of the element is confirmed and a permanent name is decided on. The recommendations are mostly ignored among scientists, who simply call these elements by their atomic number, for example "element 119" (instead of "ununennium"), with the symbol of (119) or even simply 119.

Since 2002, the IUPAC Inorganic Chemistry Division has been the official body responsible with assigning official names to new elements, with the IUPAC Council making the final decision.

== Suffixes ==
There are some standard suffixes for the element names. The suffix -ium, or less commonly -um, usually denotes a metallic element, or at least one that was thought to be metallic when it was discovered (helium is not a metal, and germanium, selenium, and tellurium are more typically termed metalloids or nonmetals). It arose from the Latin suffix of metals such as aurum (gold) and ferrum (iron). The suffix -on is used by some nonmetals (boron, carbon, silicon) as well as the noble gases from neon downward. For the noble gases, it arises from the Greek-adjective names of the stable noble gases (neon, argon, krypton, and xenon), with radon matching its source radium as well as adding the -on suffix. For the nonmetals, the -on was generalised to boron and silicon from the ending of "carbon". The -ine suffix is used only for the halogens, with chlorine being named first, and the others being named to match. The suffix -gen is used for three other nonmetals forming diatomic molecules (hydrogen, nitrogen, and oxygen). Suffixes were used more inconsistently before 1784, with tungsten (discovered 1783) the last element discovered whose English name lacks a standard suffix.

The naming rules promulgated by IUPAC in 2002 declared that all newly discovered elements should have names ending in -ium, for linguistic consistency. In 2016, this was amended so that elements in the halogen and noble gas groups would receive the traditional -ine and -on suffixes. This amendment was put into practice for tennessine (element 117) and oganesson (element 118); it was noted that the 2002 recommendations had apparently not anticipated that these elements would be reached as quickly as they were.

== Chemical symbol ==
Once an element has been named, a one- or two-letter symbol must be ascribed to it so it can be easily referred to in such contexts as the periodic table. The first letter is always capitalized. While the symbol is often a contraction of the element's name, it may sometimes not match the element's English name; for example, "Pb" for lead (from Latin plumbum) or "W" for tungsten (from German Wolfram). Elements which have only temporary systematic names are given temporary three-letter symbols (e.g. Uue for ununennium, the undiscovered element 119).

== Naming controversies ==
The naming of the synthetic elements dubnium and seaborgium generated a significant amount of controversy, referred to as the Transfermium Wars. The Americans wished to name element 105 hahnium, while the Russians preferred the name dubnium. The Americans also wished to name element 106 seaborgium. This naming dispute ran from the 1970s (when the elements were discovered) to the 1990s, when the International Union of Pure and Applied Chemistry (IUPAC) created a tentative list of the element names for elements 104 to 109. The Americans, however, refused to agree with these names because seaborgium was not in the list. Thus, IUPAC reconsidered, and in 1996 named element 105 dubnium and element 106 seaborgium.

In the past, elements would sometimes be renamed if the original discovery claim was successfully challenged: this occurred for elements 43 (technetium replacing masurium), 61 (promethium replacing illinium), and 85 (astatine replacing alabamine). To avoid confusion, this is no longer done, e.g. element 102 is still called nobelium even though that discovery claim was refuted.

== Alternative forms of an element, names indicating molecular structure, and names of compounds ==
When a pure element, comprising only one type of atom, nevertheless exists in multiple forms (allotropes) with different structure and properties, they are generally given different names; for example graphite and diamond are both forms of the element carbon. Even for elements such as nitrogen having only one stable allotrope, a name such as dinitrogen may be used to indicate its molecular structure N_{2} as well as its elemental composition. The naming of chemical compounds comprising more than one element is a complex subject, discussed at length in the article on chemical nomenclature.

== See also ==
- Chemical elements in East Asian languages
