= Maxted =

Maxted is an English locational surname from a no longer in existence village. Another theory is that is from Maxstoke, Warwickshire, England.

== Notable people with this surname ==
- Adam Maxted, British reality TV contestant
- Anna Maxted, British author
- Billy Maxted, American jazz pianist
- Jonny Maxted, British professional footballer
- Lui Maxted, British tennis player
- Stanley Maxted, British-born Canadian singer, journalist and actor
