= Philip Robinson =

Philip or Phil Robinson may refer to:

== Sports ==
- Phil Robinson (footballer, born 1942) (1942–1989), English professional footballer
- Phil Robinson (footballer, born 1967), English professional footballer
- Phil Robinson (cricketer) (born 1963), English cricketer
- Philip Robinson (jockey) (born 1961), English flat racing jockey

== Entertainment ==
- Phil Alden Robinson (born 1950), American film director and screenwriter
- Philip Robinson (music), English conductor, arranger and music educator
- Philip Robinson (author) (born 1973), English author and journalist
- Phil Robinson, Australian bassist of The Cockroaches
- Phil Robinson, drummer with Autopilot Off

== Others ==
- Philip Robinson (RAF officer), decorated Royal Air Force officer
- Philip Stewart Robinson (1847–1902), Anglo-Indian writer
- Phil Robinson (politician), American politician and member of the Ohio House of Representatives
