= List of chemical elements named after places =

Of the 118 chemical elements, 41 are named after, or have names associated with, places around the world or among astronomical objects. 32 of these have names tied to the Earth and the other 10 have names connected to bodies in the Solar System.

The first table below lists terrestrial locations (excluding the entire Earth taken as a whole) and the last table lists astronomical objects which the chemical elements are named after.

== Terrestrial locations ==
Location	Element	Symbol	Z	Coordinates
Europe	Europium	Eu	63	
Magnesia, a district in Greece	Magnesium	Mg	12	39°25′N 22°50′E
Magnesia, a district in Greece	Manganese	Mn	25	39°25′N 22°50′E
Belur, a city in India (indirectly, via the mineral beryl)	Beryllium	Be	4	13°9′44.34″N 75°52′4.51″E
India (indirectly, via the Latin indicum meaning indigo)	Indium	In	49	
Cyprus	Copper	Cu	29	
France (ancient name Gaul)	Francium	Fr	87	
France (ancient name Gaul)	Gallium	Ga	31	
Lutetia, Latin name for Paris	Lutetium	Lu	71	48.85°N 2.35°E
Germany	Germanium	Ge	32	
Hesse, a state in Germany	Hassium	Hs	108	
Darmstadt, a city in Germany	Darmstadtium	Ds	110	49°50′N 8°34′E
Rhine, a river	Rhenium	Re	75	
Strontian, a village in Scotland	Strontium	Sr	38	56°41′N 5°34′W
Scandinavia	Scandium	Sc	21	
Hafnia, Latin name for Copenhagen	Hafnium	Hf	72	55°41′N 12°34′E
Thule (perhaps Iceland or Greenland)	Thulium	Tm	69	
Holmia, Latin name for Stockholm	Holmium	Ho	67	59°20′N 18°47′E
Ytterby, a village in Sweden	Yttrium	Y	39	59°25′35″N 18°21′13″E
Ytterby, a village in Sweden	Terbium	Tb	65	59°25′35″N 18°21′13″E
Ytterby, a village in Sweden	Erbium	Er	68	59°25′35″N 18°21′13″E
Ytterby, a village in Sweden	Ytterbium	Yb	70	59°25′35″N 18°21′13″E
Poland	Polonium	Po	84	
Ruthenia, a region in Eastern Europe	Ruthenium	Ru	44	
Moscow, Russia	Moscovium	Mc	115	55°42′N 36°58′E
Dubna, a town in Russia	Dubnium	Db	105	56°44′N 37°10′E
Flerov Laboratory of Nuclear Reactions, in the Joint Institute for Nuclear Research in Dubna	Flerovium	Fl	114	56°44′N 37°10′E
Americas (some sources say the United States specifically)	Americium	Am	95	
California, a state in the United States	Californium	Cf	98	
Berkeley, California, a city in the United States	Berkelium	Bk	97	37°52′N 122°16′W
Lawrence Livermore National Laboratory, in the United States (Also Robert Livermore's name)	Livermorium	Lv	116	37°41′N 121°43′W
Tennessee, a state in the United States	Tennessine	Ts	117	
Japan (Nihon)	Nihonium	Nh	113	

== Astronomical objects ==
Location	Element	Symbol	Z
Sun	Helium	He	2
Mercury*	Mercury*	Hg	80
Venus**	Phosphorus**	P	15
Moon	Selenium	Se	34
Pallas (asteroid)	Palladium	Pd	46
Earth	Tellurium	Te	52
Ceres (dwarf planet)	Cerium	Ce	58
Uranus	Uranium	U	92
Neptune	Neptunium	Np	93
Pluto (dwarf planet)	Plutonium	Pu	94

* - The element mercury was named directly for the deity, with only indirect naming connection to the planet (see etymology of mercury).
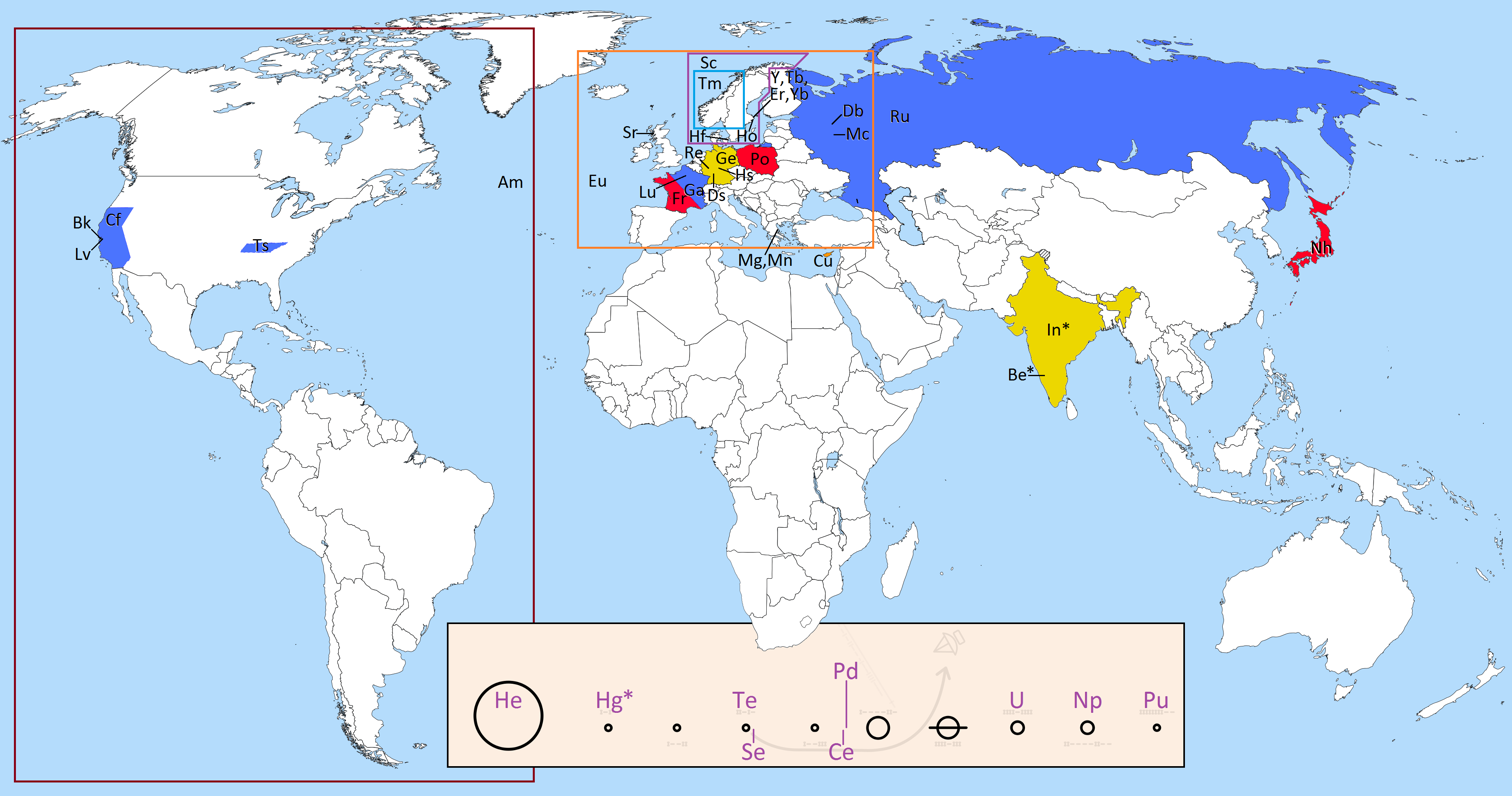
** - Phosphorus was the Ancient Greek name for the planet Venus. (see history of phosphorus).

== See also ==
- List of chemical elements named after people
- List of chemical element name etymologies
