= Derek Lowe (chemist) =

American chemist

Derek Lowe is a medicinal chemist working on preclinical drug discovery in the pharmaceutical industry. Lowe has published a blog about this field, "In the Pipeline", since 2002 and is a columnist for the Royal Society of Chemistry's Chemistry World.

== Biography ==
Lowe (born in Harrisburg, Arkansas) got his BA from Hendrix College and his PhD in organic chemistry from Duke University on synthesis of natural products, before researching for a year in Germany on a Humboldt Fellowship.

Lowe was one of the first people to blog from inside the pharmaceutical industry, with the approval of his supervisor and the company legal department, and one of the first science bloggers. By 2006, his blog had between 3,000 and 4,000 visitors per day during the workweek; he covered business matters, trends and issues in medicinal chemistry, and legal matters like patent law and regulation. At that time he was working at a pharmaceutical company doing hit to lead medicinal chemistry work. As of 2010 his blog received between 15,000 and 20,000 page views on a typical weekday. His response to a 2013 article in BuzzFeed that propagated chemophobia was widely cited.

He serves on the editorial board of ACS Medicinal Chemistry Letters and on the advisory board of Chemical & Engineering News.

As of 2026 he was working at Novartis; formerly he had worked for 10 years at Vertex, 9 years at Bayer, and 8 years at Schering-Plough.

== Notable publications ==
=== Book ===
- Lowe, Derek B. (2016). The Chemistry Book: From Gunpowder to Graphene, 250 Milestones in the History of Chemistry. Sterling. ISBN 9781454911807.

=== Selected scientific papers ===
- Greenlee, W; Clader, J; et al. (April 2001). "Muscarinic agonists and antagonists in the treatment of Alzheimer's disease". Farmaco. 56 (4): 247–50. doi:10.1016/s0014-827x(01)01102-8. PMID 11421251.
- Lowe, DB; Magnuson, S; et al. (21 June 2004). "In vitro SAR of (5-(2H)-isoxazolonyl) ureas, potent inhibitors of hormone-sensitive lipase". Bioorganic & Medicinal Chemistry Letters. 14 (12): 3155–9. doi:10.1016/j.bmcl.2004.04.015. PMID 15149665.
- Rudolph, J; Esler, WP; et al. (18 October 2007). "Quinazolinone derivatives as orally available ghrelin receptor antagonists for the treatment of diabetes and obesity". Journal of Medicinal Chemistry. 50 (21): 5202–16. doi:10.1021/jm070071+. PMID 17887659.
- Arrowsmith, CH; Audia, JE; et al. (August 2015). "The promise and peril of chemical probes". Nature Chemical Biology. 11 (8): 536–41. doi:10.1038/nchembio.1867. PMC 4706458. PMID 26196764.

=== Selected blogs or commentary ===
- Lowe, Derek (7 February 2002). "The Latest Thing". In the Pipeline. (1st post)
- Lowe, Derek (7 May 2010). "Molecular modelling's $10-million comeback?". Nature. doi:10.1038/news.2010.223.
- Lowe, Derek (23 February 2010). "Things I Won't Work With: Dioxygen Difluoride". In the Pipeline. Cited in "Pressure Cooker". What-if xkcd. April 9, 2013.
- Lowe, Derek (24 September 2010). "Avandia Goes Down: A Research Rant". In the Pipeline.
- Lowe, Derek (21 June 2013). "Eight Toxic Foods: A Little Chemical Education". In the Pipeline., "Eight Toxic Foods: The Aftermath". In the Pipeline. 24 June 2013.
- Lowe, Derek (24 August 2016). "Drug Mergers Hurt in Every Direction (Save One)". In the Pipeline.
- Lowe, Derek (12 January 2017). "Curcumin Will Waste Your Time". In the Pipeline. Archived from the original on 6 April 2019.
- Lowe, Derek (10 January 2018). "Objections to (Some) Drug Discovery AI". In the Pipeline.
