= Yuri Oganessian =

Armenian and Russian nuclear physicist (born 1933)

- Юрий Оганесян
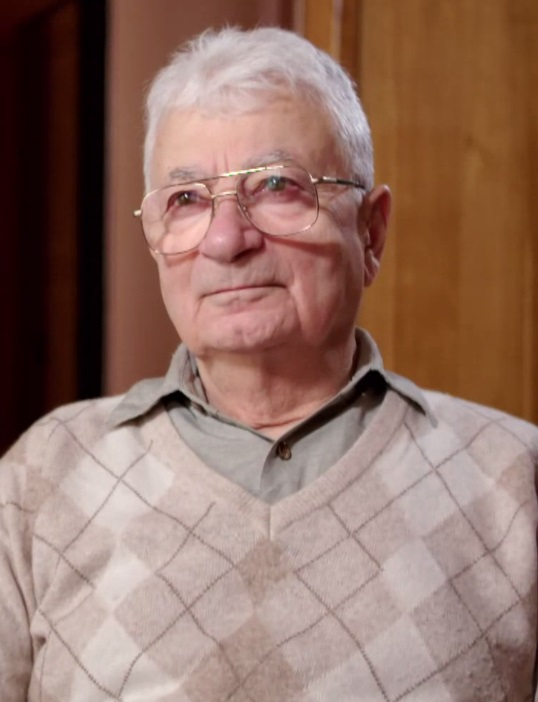
- Oganessian in 2016
- Born: Yuri Tsolakovich Oganessian; 14 April 1933 (age 93); Rostov-on-Don, Russian SFSR, Soviet Union
- Citizenship: Soviet Union (1933–1991); Russia (1991–present); Armenia (2018–present)
- Education: Moscow Engineering Physics Institute
- Known for: Co-discoverer of the heaviest elements in the periodic table; element oganesson named after him
- Awards: Lomonosov Gold Medal (2017); Demidov Prize (2019)
- Scientific career
- Fields: Nuclear physics
- Workplaces: Flerov Laboratory of Nuclear Reactions at the Joint Institute for Nuclear Research

Yuri Tsolakovich Oganessian (Note: Russian: Юрий Цолакович Оганесян, IPA: [ˈjʉrʲɪj tsɐˈlakəvʲɪtɕ ɐɡənʲɪˈsʲan]; Armenian: Յուրի Ցոլակի Հովհաննիսյան, romanized: Yuri Ts'olaki Hovhannisyan, IPA: [juˈɾi tsʰɔlɑˈki hɔvhɑnnisˈjɑn]. Oganessian is the Russified version of the Armenian last name Hovhannisyan. The article on Oganessian in the Armenian Soviet Encyclopedia (1980) described him as an "Armenian Soviet physicist".) (born 14 April 1933) is a Russian and Armenian nuclear physicist who is best known as a researcher of superheavy elements. He has led the discovery of multiple chemical elements. He succeeded Georgy Flyorov as director of the Flyorov Laboratory of Nuclear Reactions at the Joint Institute for Nuclear Research in 1989 and is now its scientific director. The heaviest known element, oganesson, is named after him, only the second time that an element was named after a living person, and the only one who is still alive (the other is seaborgium, named for Glenn T. Seaborg, who died in 1999). (Note: The names einsteinium and fermium for elements 99 and 100 were proposed when their namesakes (Albert Einstein and Enrico Fermi) were still alive, but were not made official until Einstein and Fermi had died.)

== Personal life ==
Yuri Tsolakovich Oganessian was born in Rostov-on-Don, Russian SFSR, USSR on 14 April 1933 to Armenian parents. His father, Tsolak, was from Igdir (now in Turkey), while his mother was from Armavir in what is now Russia's Krasnodar Krai. Oganessian spent his childhood in Yerevan, the capital of Soviet Armenia, where his family relocated in 1939. His father, a thermal engineer, was invited to work on the synthetic rubber plant in Yerevan. After the Eastern Front of World War II commenced, his family decided to not return to Rostov since it was occupied by Germans. Yuri attended and finished school in Yerevan. He initially wanted to become a painter.

Oganessian was married to Irina Levonovna (1932–2010), a violinist and a music teacher in Dubna, with whom he had two daughters. As of 2017, his daughters resided in the U.S.

Oganessian speaks Russian, Armenian, and English.

== Career ==
"A remarkable physicist and experimentalist… his work is characterised by originality, an ability to approach a problem from an unexpected side, and to achieve an ultimate result."

— Flyorov on Oganessian, 1990

Oganessian graduated from the Moscow Engineering Physics Institute (MEPhI) in 1956. He thereafter sought to join the Kurchatov Institute of Atomic Energy in Moscow, but as there were no vacancies left in Gersh Budker's team, he was instead recruited by Georgy Flyorov and began working at the Joint Institute for Nuclear Research (JINR) in Dubna, near Moscow.

Oganessian became director of the Flyorov Laboratory of Nuclear Reactions at JINR in 1989, after Flyorov retired, and had the job until 1996, when he was named the scientific director of the Flyorov laboratory.

=== Discovery of superheavy chemical elements ===
During the 1970s, Oganessian invented the "cold fusion" method, a technique to produce transactinide elements (superheavy elements). Though they share a name, this process is unrelated to the unproven energy-producing process also named cold fusion. Oganessian's process was crucial for the discoveries of elements from 106 to 113. From the mid-1970s to the mid-1990s, the partnership of JINR, directed by Oganessian, and the GSI Helmholtz Centre for Heavy Ion Research in Germany resulted in the discovery of six chemical elements (107 to 112): bohrium, meitnerium, hassium, darmstadtium, roentgenium, and copernicium.

His newer technique, termed "hot fusion" (also unrelated to nuclear fusion as an energy process), helped lead to the discovery of elements 113 to 118, completing the seventh row of the periodic table. The technique involved bombarding calcium into targets containing heavier radioactive elements that are rich in neutrons at a cyclotron. The elements discovered using this method are nihonium (2003; also discovered by Riken in Japan using cold fusion), flerovium (1999), moscovium (2003), livermorium (2000), tennessine (2009), and oganesson (2002).

== Recognition ==
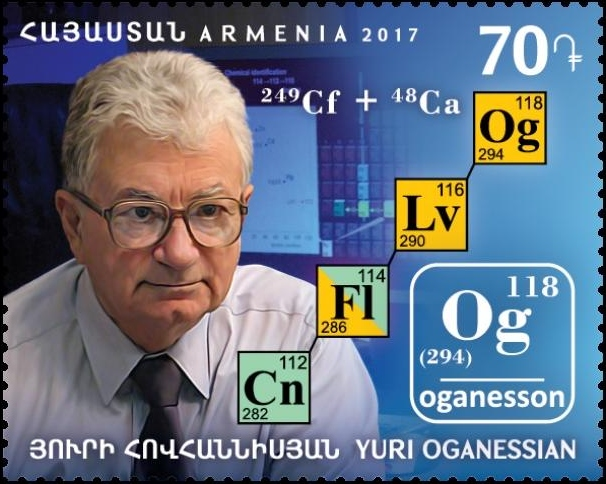
Oganessian on a 2017 Armenian stamp

Sherry Yennello has called him the "grandfather of superheavy elements". Oganessian is the author of three discoveries, a monograph, 11 inventions, and more than 300 scientific papers.

Oganessian has been considered worthy of a Nobel laureate in Chemistry, including by Alexander Sergeev, former head of the Russian Academy of Sciences.

=== Oganesson ===
During early 2016, science writers and bloggers speculated that one of the superheavy elements would be named oganessium or oganesson. The International Union of Pure and Applied Chemistry (IUPAC) announced in November 2016 that element 118 would be named oganesson to honor Oganessian. It was first observed in 2002 at JINR, by a joint team of Russian and American scientists. Directed by Oganessian, the team included American scientists of the Lawrence Livermore National Laboratory, California. Prior to this announcement, a dozen elements had been named after people, (Note: 12 other elements named in honor of people: curium, einsteinium, fermium, mendelevium, nobelium, lawrencium, rutherfordium, seaborgium, bohrium, meitnerium, roentgenium, copernicium; in addition, the intention behind the name flerovium was to honour Flerov.) but of those, only seaborgium was likewise named while its namesake (Glenn T. Seaborg) was alive. (The names einsteinium and fermium were suggested when their namesakes, respectively Albert Einstein and Enrico Fermi, were still alive; however, by the time the names became official, Einstein and Fermi had both died.) As Seaborg died in 1999, Oganessian is the only currently living namesake of an element.

=== Honors and awards ===
In 1990, Oganessian was elected Corresponding Member of the Soviet Academy of Sciences and in 2003 a Full Member (Academician) of the Russian Academy of Sciences.

Oganessian has honorary degrees from Goethe University Frankfurt (2002), University of Messina (2009), and Yerevan State University (2022). In 2019, he was elected as an Honorary Fellow of St Catharine's College, Cambridge.

==== State awards ====
- Order of the Badge of Honour
- Order of the Red Banner of Labour
- Lenin Komsomol Prize (1967)
- USSR State Prize (1975)
- Order of Friendship (1993)
- Order "For Merit to the Fatherland", 4th class (1999)
- Order "For Merit to the Fatherland", 3rd class (2003)
- Order of Honour (2009)
- State Prize of the Russian Federation (2010)
- Order of Honor (Armenia) (2016)
- Order "For Merit to the Fatherland", 2nd class (2017)
- Order of St. Mesrop Mashtots (Armenia, 2019)

==== Professional awards ====
- Kurchatov Medal (1989)
- Lise Meitner Prize of the European Physical Society (2000)
- Lomonosov Gold Medal (2018) "for fundamental research in the fields of interaction of complex nuclei and experimental evidence of existence of an 'island of stability' for superheavy elements"
- Demidov Prize (2019)
- UNESCO-Russia Mendeleev International Prize in the Basic Sciences (2021)

==== Recognition in Armenia ====
Oganessian was granted Armenian citizenship in July 2018 by Premier Nikol Pashinyan. Oganessian is a member of the Board of Trustees of the Foundation for Armenian Science and Technology (FAST). He is also the chairman of the international scientific board of the Alikhanian National Science Laboratory (Yerevan Physics Institute). In 2017, HayPost issued a postage stamp dedicated to Oganessian. The Central Bank of Armenia issued a silver commemorative coin dedicated to Oganessian and the element oganesson (Og) in 2022. He was also named honorary professor of Yerevan State University in April that year.

== Selected publications ==
- Oganessian, Yuri (13 September 2001). "Nuclear physics: Sizing up the heavyweights". Nature. 413 (6852): 122–125. Bibcode:2001Natur.413..122O. doi:10.1038/35093194. PMID 11557964. S2CID 4414134.
