= Philip Robinson (author) =

Philip Robinson b. 1973 is a journalist who writes primarily for the Mail on Sunday and the Daily Mail. He claims that his career has brought him in contact with gangsters, pirates, special forces operators, despotic generals, corrupt cops, professional gamblers, fixers, Lear jet repo men, and multimillionaire hedge fund brats. His first novel, Charlie Big Potatoes, was published in 2003 by Macmillan, and, according to WorldCat, is in 202 libraries and his second, USS Alcatraz, in 2012. He lives with his wife, fellow author Anna Maxted, and their three sons in North London.
