= Philip Robinson (music) =

Philip Robinson is an English conductor, arranger and music educator.

He was born in Lancashire and was educated at Chetham’s School of Music in Manchester. He then studied French horn at the Royal Northern College of Music under the tuition of David Cripps (former principal of both the Hallé and the London Symphony Orchestra), and graduated from Manchester University in 1998. He has held posts as Musical Director of the University of Manchester Chamber Choir, Training Choir and Orchestra, University of Keele Concert Band, Congleton Youth Orchestra and La Faminite Ensemble - a chamber orchestra made up of music students based in the North West. He is in demand as a composer and arranger for a wide variety of different groups, having many of his arrangements performed at the Bridgewater Hall in Manchester, Symphony Hall in Birmingham and the Sage Gateshead. For five years he was musical director of Sing Live North West, a choir of over 300 singers from the Greater Manchester area. In June 2006, several of his works were performed by Jane MacDonald, Peter Corry and a 1000 voice choir in a concert at Sheffield Arena to mark the 80th birthday of HM the Queen and the 85th birthday of the Royal British Legion.

He was head of music at Avondale High School (now Stockport Academy) for three years and in 2004 took up the role of assistant director of music at Stockport Grammar School. In September 2009, he became the director of music at The King’s School, Chester. He left this position to take up the director of music position at Birkenhead School in 2013. In addition to his teaching position, he was, until 2012, principal conductor of the Warrington Youth Orchestra, and until 2009 was musical director of the Stockport Youth Wind Orchestra and Manchester University Wind Orchestra. From 2005 to 2010 he was chairman of the British Association of Symphonic Bands and Wind Ensembles (BASBWE), and since 2017 has been musical director of the Wirral Symphonic Wind Band. He lives in Wirral with his wife and two young sons.
