= Anna Maxted =

British writer (born 1969)

- Born: 1969 (age 56–57); England
- Occupation: Novelist
- Writing career
- Period: 2000-present
- Genre: Chick lit

Anna Maxted is an author based in North London, England.

== Biography ==
Born in 1969, she is married to fellow author and journalist Philip Robinson and they have three young sons. She writes female contemporary fiction, which is viewed as being at the high end of the chick lit market.

Anna Maxted read English literature at Girton College, Cambridge, before becoming a journalist. She is former Assistant Editor of Cosmopolitan, and has freelanced for most national newspapers and magazines, including The Independent on Sunday, The Daily Telegraph, The Daily Mirror, Sunday Mirror, The Times, Daily Express, FHM, Esquire and Living Etc.

Her first novel Getting Over It, was semi-autobiographical and based very much around her experience of the death of her own father. It was a bestseller in The New York Times.

She is writing freelance writer for over 30 years. She does features for Times2 and the Weekend section since 2013.

== Bibliography ==
- Getting Over It, July 2000, ReganBooks, US/Arrow, UK
- Running In Heels, Sept 2001, ReganBooks, US/Arrow UK
- Behaving Like Adults, August 2003 ReganBooks, US/Arrow, UK
- Being Committed, June 2005, ReganBooks, US/Arrow UK
- A Tale of Two Sisters, July 2006 Publisher: Dutton, US/William Heinemann, UK
- Rich Again, December 2009, St. Martin's Griffin
