= Hugo Lagercrantz =

Swedish pediatrician (born 1945)

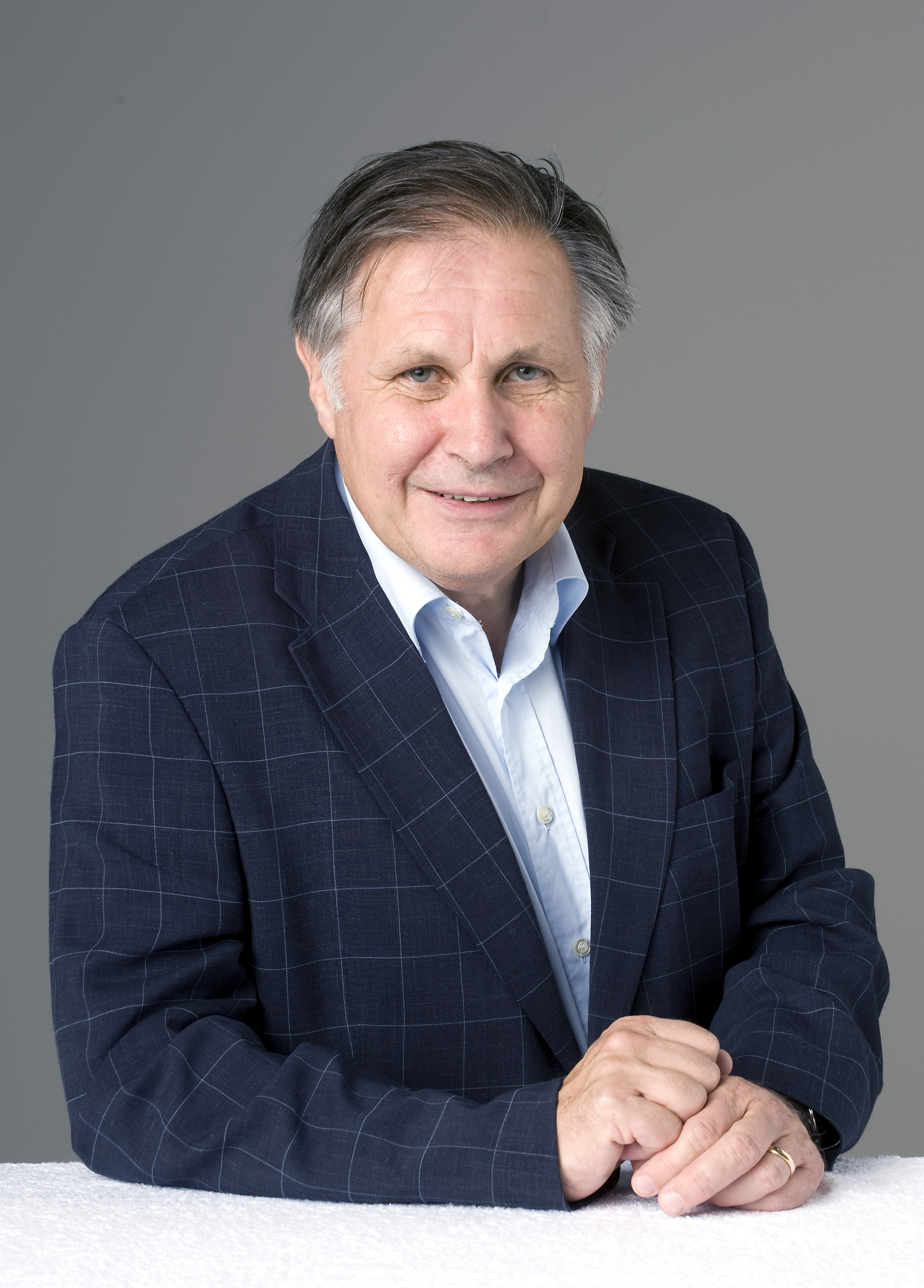
- Born: Carl Hugo Lagercrantz; 18 April 1945 (age 79)

Carl Hugo Lagercrantz (born 18 April 1945) is a Swedish pediatrician. He is Professor Emeritus of Pediatrics at the Karolinska Institute and is a former member of both the Nobel Assembly at the Karolinska Institute, which awards the Nobel Prize in Physiology or Medicine, and the assembly's five-member working body, the Nobel Committee for Physiology or Medicine. He has also formerly been President of the Swedish Pediatric Society and the European Society for Pediatric Research. Since 2005 he has been editor-in-chief of Acta Paediatrica. Lagercrantz was appointed professor of pediatrics at Karolinska Institute in 1989 and was director of the Neonatal Programme at the Astrid Lindgren Children's Hospital at Karolinska University Hospital until 2004. He earned his PhD in 1971 at Karolinska Institute and has also written several books. He is a member of the Swedish noble Lagercrantz family, which was ennobled in the 17th century, and is a descendant of Swedish finance minister Gustaf Lagercrantz.

== Honours ==
- Nils Rosén von Rosenstein Prize (2014)
