= Nobel Committee for Physiology or Medicine =

The Nobel Committee for Physiology or Medicine is the Nobel Committee responsible for proposing laureates for the Nobel Prize in Physiology or Medicine. The Nobel Committee for Physiology or Medicine is appointed by the Nobel Assembly at the Karolinska Institute, a body of 50 members at Karolinska Institute that is formally a separate body not part of the institute itself. It consists of professors of physiology or medical subjects active at Karolinska Institute. Other than the five ordinary members, ten associated members are appointed each year, for that year only.

The committee is a working body that invites nominations and evaluates candidates nominated for the Nobel Prize. The final decision to award the Nobel Prize for Physiology or Medicine is taken by the Nobel Assembly at Karolinska Institute and based on a proposal from the Nobel Committee.

== Controversies ==
Over the years, there have been many controversies concerned with the process by which nominations and awards of the Nobel Prize. To avoid any possible appearance of bias, the Nobel Committee states that once 50 years has passed since the time of nomination, it will make the criteria for the selection of award recipients public. Currently (August 2, 2011) the Nobel Prize award site is more than 10 years late in providing these criteria. See Nobel Prize controversies.

== Current members ==
The members for 2025 of the committee are:

- Olle Kämpe, chair, elected 2020
- Per Svenningsson, vice chair, elected 2021
- Sten Linnarsson, elected 2022
- Abdel El Manira, elected 2023
- Rickard Sandberg, elected 2024

== Secretary ==
Thomas Perlmann is the permanent secretary since 2016.

The secretary is in charge of the organization for the Nobel Committee and Assembly. He participates ex officio in their meetings and is usually their representative on the board of the Nobel Foundation.

== Former secretaries ==
- Göran Liljestrand, 1918–1960
- Ulf von Euler, 1960–1965
- Bengt Gustavsson, 1966–1978
- Jan Lindsten, 1979–1990
- Alf Lindberg, 1991–1992
- Nils Ringertz, 1992–1999
- Hans Jörnvall, 2000–2008
- Göran K. Hansson, 2009–2014
- Urban Lendahl, 2015–2016

== Former members ==
- Karl Mörner, 1900–?
- Carl Sundberg, 1904–1916
- Johan Erik Johansson, 1904–? (chairman 1918–?)
- Frithiof Lennmalm, 1908–1910, 1917–1918 and 1920–?
- Jules Åkerman, 1911–?
- Edvard Welander, 1911–?
- Johan Albin Dalén, 1911–?
- Bror Gadelius, 1914–?
- Frans Westermark, 1914–?
- John Sjöqvist, 1918–1928
- Gunnar Hedrén, ?–1922
- Einar Hammarsten, 1929–?
- Alfred Pettersson, 1932–1934
- Folke Henschen, 1935–?
- Gunnar Holmgren, 1938–?
- Göran Liljestrand, 1938–?
- Viktor Wigert, 1938–?
- Gösta Häggqvist, around 1940
- Hilding Bergstrand, ?–1952 (chairman 1947–1952)
- Ulf von Euler, 1953–1960 (chairman 1958–1960)
- Axel Westman, 1955–?
- Hugo Theorell, 1958–?
- Carl-Axel Hamberger, 1961–1966
- Erling Norrby, 1975–1980
- Rolf Zetterström, 1975–?
- David Ottoson, 1974–1984 (chairman 1982–1984)
- Nils Ringertz, 1981–1987 (chairman 1985–1987)
- Sten Orrenius, 1983–2002
- Jan Wersäll, 1984–1990
- Bengt Samuelsson, 1984–? (chairman 1987–89)
- Tomas Hökfelt, 1985–?
- Hans Wigzell, 1987–1992 (chairman 1990–1992)
- Sten Grillner, 1987-1997 (chairman 1995–1997)
- Gösta Gahrton, 1988-1997 (vice chairman 1995–1996; chairman 1997)
- Ralf F. Pettersson, 1995–2000 (chairman 1998–2000)
- Staffan Normark, 1996–2001
- Sten Lindahl, 1997–2002 (chairman 2001–2002)
- Bo Angelin, 1998–2003 (chairman 2003)
- Björn Vennström, 2001–2006
- Göran K. Hansson, 2002–2007 (chairman 2004–2006)
- Erna Möller, 2003–2005
- Lars Terenius, 2003–2005
- Nils-Göran Larsson, 2006–2008
- Bertil Fredholm, 2004–2009 (chairman 2007–2008)
- Klas Kärre, 2006–2011 (chairman 2009–11)
- Carlos Ibáñez, 2008–2011
- Urban Lendahl, 2007–2012 (chairman 2012)
- Jan Andersson, 2008–2013
- Rune Toftgård, elected 2010–2014
- Juleen R. Zierath, 2011-2016 (vice chairman 2012; chairman 2013-2015)
- Anna Wedell, 2013–2018 (chair 2016–2018)
- Patrik Ernfors, 2015–2020 (chair 2019–2020)
- Nils-Göran Larsson, 2017–2022 (chair 2021–2022)
- Gunilla Karlsson-Hedestam, 2019–2024 (chair 2023-2024)
