= Thomas Perlmann =

Swedish professor

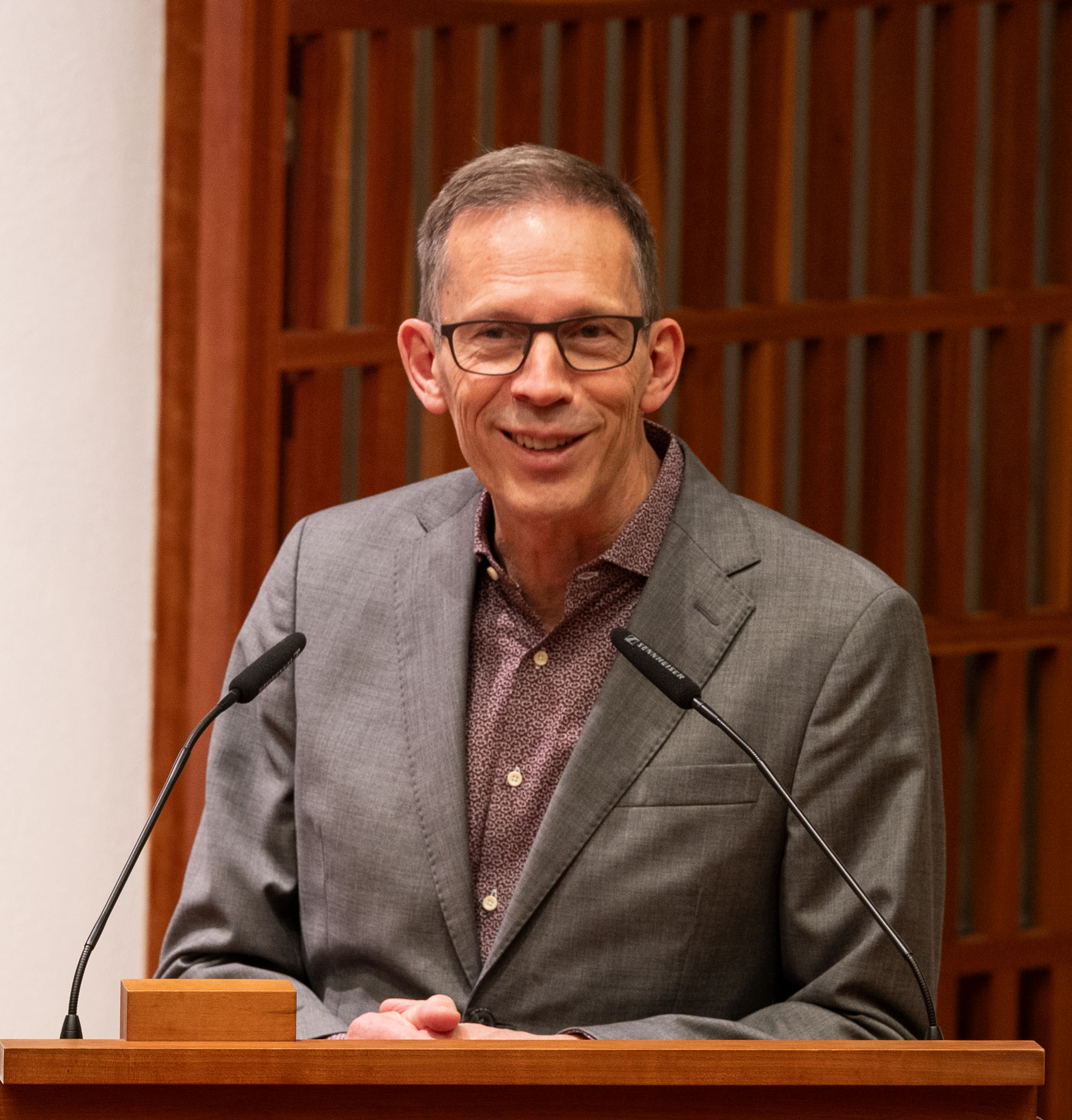
Professor Thomas Perlmann of Karolinska Institutet, Member of the Nobel Committee (6 December 2024).

Rolf Thomas Perlmann (born March 2, 1959, in Stockholm, Sweden) is a professor of molecular developmental biology at Karolinska Institute. In 2006, he became a member of the Nobel Assembly at the Karolinska Institute. He became an adjunct member of Karolinska Institutet's Nobel Committee in 2008 and was then elected in 2012. He has been Secretary for the Nobel Committee for Physiology or Medicine since 2016.

In 2022, he was elected a member of the Academia Europaea.
