= Björn Vennström =

Swedish molecular biologist

Björn Vennström (born 1948) is a Swedish molecular biologist. He received his Ph.D. in 1978 at Uppsala University with a thesis on RNA and in 1993, was appointed Professor of Developmental Biology at the Karolinska Institute. He is also a professor of molecular biology at the same institution. He was elected a member of the Royal Swedish Academy of Sciences, was awarded the Göran Gustafsson Prize in 1991, has served on the Nobel Committee for Physiology or Medicine from 2001 to 2006, and is the Chairman of the Nobel Assembly.

While at the EMBL in Heidelberg he cloned the c-erbA gene in 1984 and demonstrated in 1986 that the c-erbA gene encodes a high affinity thyroid hormone receptor.
