= Kevin Xu =

Chinese-American businessman (born 1988)

- 徐鹏
- Born: 1988 (age 37–38); Jinan, China
- Education: University of Southern California

Kevin Xu (simplified Chinese: 徐鹏; traditional Chinese: 徐鵬; born 1988 in Jinan) is a Chinese-American businessman. He is the chief executive officer and chairman of the biotechnology company Mebo focusing on "regenerative medicine". He also is CEO of Skingenix, Inc, and an investor in LA Weekly.

== Early life and personal life ==
Xu was born in 1988 in Jinan to Lily Li and Rongxiang Xu. When he was eight years old, Xu moved to the United States for his studies. He attended the University of Southern California, where he received a neuroscience degree. Xu is a resident of Los Angeles.

== Business career ==
=== Mebo ===
After graduating from university, he joined Mebo, a biotechnology company established by his father, surgeon Rongxiang Xu focusing on "regenerative medicine". Situated in China and Los Angeles, Mebo produces burn injury medication called Moist Exposed Burn Ointment (MEBO). In 2013, Rongxiang Xu filed a lawsuit against the Nobel Assembly at the Karolinska Institute in Sweden for reputational damages resulting from his exclusion from the 2012 Nobel Prize for Medicine, which the Nobel Foundation said was "frivolous". At the time, Kevin Xu claimed that MEBO products had helped 20 million burn victims restore their skin, and explained to The Scientist magazine that his father had not wanted to spend time writing articles for mainstream peer-reviewed journals to prove that MEBO products shared the regenerative properties of stem cells. He also defended his father's decision to issue a public announcement in a major Chinese newspaper against researcher Shinya Yamanaka's stem cell study published in Cell, explaining, "My dad wanted to clarify that regenerative potential is innate and there is no need to excessively engineer it."

Rongxiang Xu suddenly died in 2015, leaving 27-year-old Kevin Xu to take over the company. Xu became the chief executive officer and the chair of Mebo, assisted by mentors through the transition. At the time, Xu described Mebo International as "a California- and Beijing-based intellectual property management company that focuses on the exploitation and management of the intangible assets regarding in situ regeneration in applied medical and health promotion systems (human body regenerative restoration science)." In 2023, a search in the California company register showed roughly 12 "Mebo"-named companies such as Mebo International, Mebo Capital and Mebo Fortune that were owned by Xu and his mother.

=== Skingenix ===
Xu also is CEO of Skingenix, Inc., a botanical drug development company that has sponsored clinical test trials to test the effectiveness of MEBO products in healing foot ulcers and burns. Xu has stated that "Skingenix is the only company in the entire US that is authorized to use the human body regeneration system techniques...Being the pioneer in the industry, we are not bound by any guidelines, as there is perfectly no guidelines for the botanical drugs."

=== LA Weekly ===
In October 2017, Xu became an investor in LA Weekly, along with David Welch, Brian Calle, and others. Welch filed a lawsuit against the other owners in August 2018, accusing Calle and Xu of incorrectly informing workers that the publisher had to cut how much paid time off they had owing to local statutes. Xu was also accused of integrating LA Weekly into a joint venture without the consent of LA Weekly and receiving compensation from the other party. Calle called the lawsuit "frivolous". As of 2018, the specific outcome of the lawsuit had not been made public.

== Other activities ==
Xu was selected by California Governor Jerry Brown in 2015 to become a consultant who advocated for California–China trade and economic collaboration. He created a think tank at the University of Chicago that bears his name. He is the board of directors chair of the San Francisco-based pro-business association Bay Area Council and Marina Times owner Street Media LLC. After Mebo gave a $1 million donation to San Francisco to defray the city's expenses for hosting APEC United States 2023, Xu was appointed the co-chair of the APEC Host Committee.
