= Wallgren =

Wallgren is a surname. Notable people with the surname include:

- Arvid Wallgren (1889–1973), Swedish pediatrician
- Elia (Wallgrén) (born 1961), bishop of the Finnish Orthodox Church
- Gunn Wållgren (1913–1983), Swedish actress
- Henning Wallgren (born 1968), Norwegian competitive shooter
- Ingrid Wallgren (1923–2016), Swedish canoeist
- Jocke Wallgren, drummer for Swedish band Amon Amarth
- Karin Lundgren (née Wallgren; born 1944), Swedish sprinter
- Monrad Wallgren (1891–1961), American politician
- Thomas Wallgren (born 1958), Finnish philosopher, activist, and politician

== See also ==
- Wahlgren
