= Rolf Zetterström =

Swedish pediatrician (1920–2011)

Rolf Zetterström (24 August 1920 – 29 September 2011) was a Swedish pediatrician. He was Professor of Pediatrics at the Karolinska Institute from 1962 until his retirement in 1986. Zetterström also had a central role in the institutions awarding the Nobel Prize in Physiology or Medicine.

== Career ==
He graduated as a physician at the Karolinska Institute in 1940 and earned his Licentiate's degree in 1944 and his doctorate in 1951, also at the Karolinska Institute. He became Professor of Pediatrics at University of Gothenburg in 1958, at the age of 38. In 1962 he became Professor of Pediatrics at the Karolinska Institute. He was also director of the Crown Princess Louise's Hospital for Children in Stockholm and later head of the children's clinic at Saint Göran Hospital from 1970 to 1986, and was involved in efforts to promote children's health in several developing countries in Africa and elsewhere. He became Professor Emeritus in 1986.

From 1962 to 1986 Zetterström was a member of the Nobel Assembly at the Karolinska Institute, which awards the Nobel Prize in Physiology or Medicine; from 1975 to 1983 he was also a member of the Nobel Committee for Physiology or Medicine, the five-member working body of the assembly that invites nominations, evaluates candidates and proposes the laureate(s) for the award before the formal decision is taken by the assembly. From 1975 he was also a member of the Royal Swedish Academy of Sciences, the institution which awards two other Nobel Prizes and several other awards.

Zetterström was the chief editor of the journal Acta Paediatrica from 1965 to 2005. Established in 1921 and based at Karolinska Institute, the journal was originally conceived as a leading pediatrics journal meant to showcase the best of Scandinavian pediatric research to a global audience, and still primarily published Scandinavian researchers at the time he became editor; during his tenure as editor the journal became increasingly international and by the time he left office nearly two thirds of the published papers were authored by non-Scandinavian researchers.

In 2000, Zetterström was awarded the Solstickan Prize.

== Personal life ==
He was married from 1946 to 1958 to the physician and ophthalmologist Birgitta Zetterström-Karpe, who became the second female Professor at the Karolinska Institute in 1974, and they had three daughters. He was married in his second marriage from 1959 to the Czech-born physician Jelena Rennerová, and they had one daughter; Jelena Rennerová had formerly been married in a proforma marriage to Olof Palme, the Swedish Prime Minister, for the purpose of helping her escape Communist Czechoslovakia in 1949.

He is grandfather to Swedish footballer Jacob Widell Zetterström.
