= Adolf Lichtenstein =

Swedish pediatrician

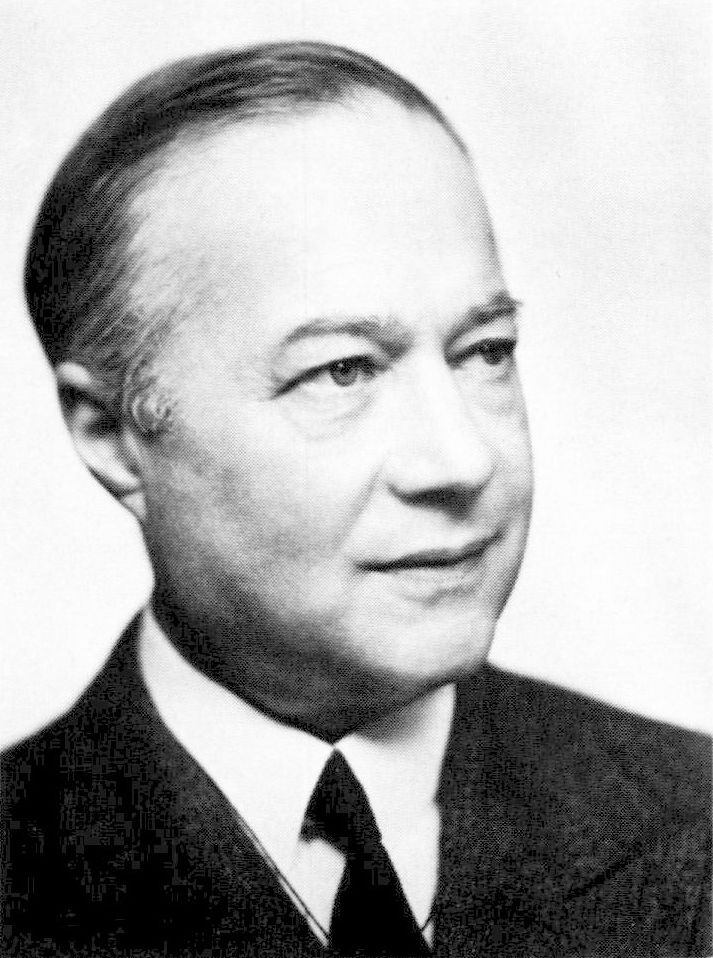
Adolf Lichtenstein

Adolf Lichtenstein (born 1 November 1884 in Stockholm, died 21 July 1950 in Stockholm) was a Swedish pediatrician. He was Professor of Pediatrics at the Karolinska Institute, a member of the Nobel Assembly at the Karolinska Institute and editor-in-chief of Acta Paediatrica from 1945 til 1950.

Lichtenstein was born a Jewish family in Stockholm, where his father was a wealthy businessman. After completing his medical education he earned a doctoral degree in 1917 and became a docent (reader) in pediatrics at Karolinska Institute in the same year. From 1923 he was also chief consultant at Stockholms epidemisjukhus. In 1932 he was appointed professor of pediatrics at Karolinska Institute and chief consultant at Crown Princess Louise's Hospital for Children.
