= Göran K. Hansson =

Swedish physician and scientist

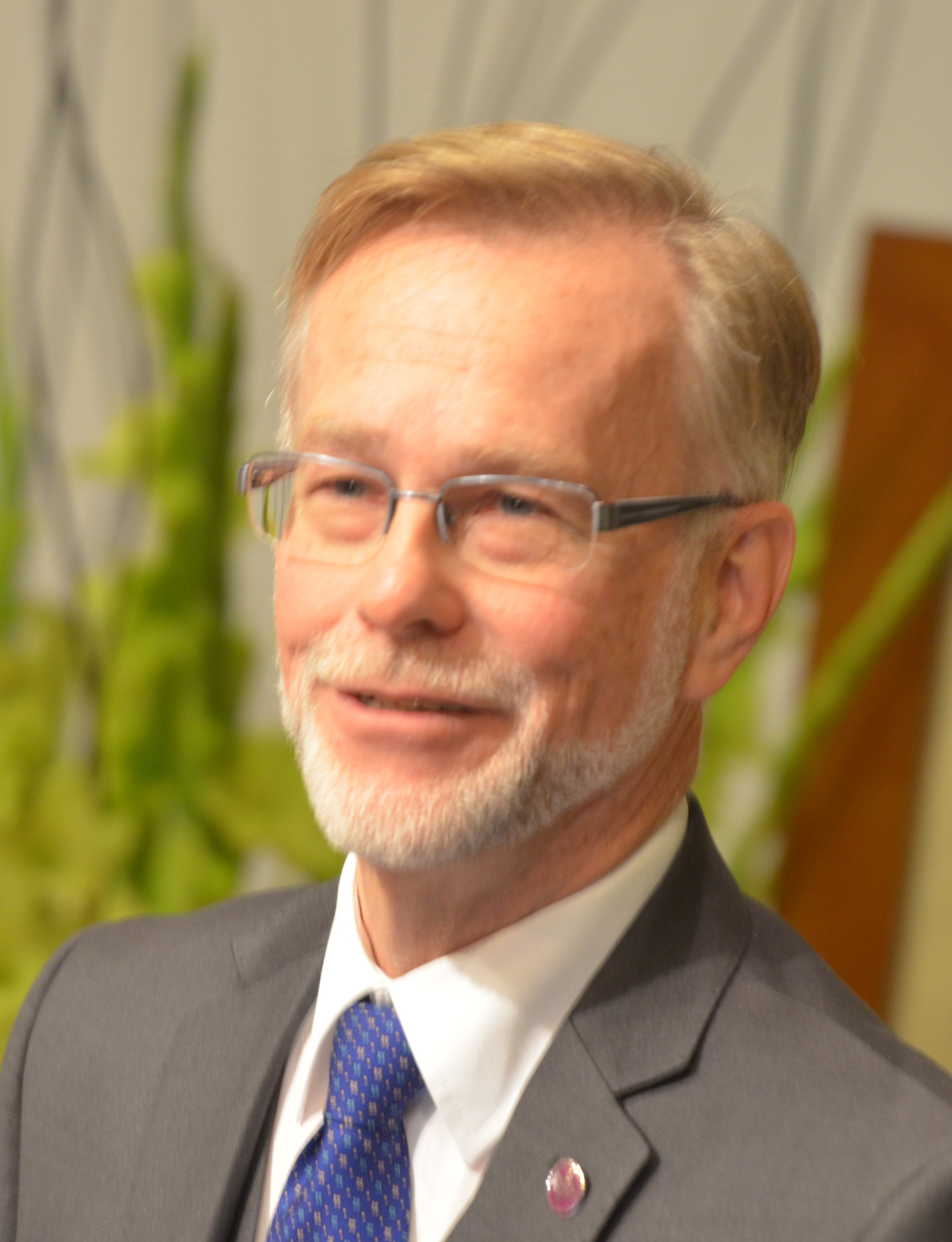

Göran K. Hansson (born 1951), is a Swedish physician and scientist.

== Biography ==
Hansson was awarded his doctorate in 1980 at the University of Gothenburg. He has been a research scientist at the University of Washington in Seattle, professor of cell biology at the University of Gothenburg, and visiting professor at Harvard Medical School. Since 1995, he is professor of experimental cardiovascular research at the Karolinska Institute.

His research concerns the interplay between the immune system and blood vessels, and the cause of atherosclerosis.

Important contributions include the discovery of inflammatory cells and signals in atherosclerotic arteries and of protective immune responses against this disease.

In 2007, Hansson was elected member of the Royal Swedish Academy of Sciences and served as its secretary general from 2015 until 2022. Hansson is also a member of Academia Europaea and was previously a member of the Nobel Assembly at the Karolinska Institute. He has served on the Nobel Committee for Physiology or Medicine at the Karolinska Institute (for the Nobel Prize in Physiology or Medicine) for 17 years and was its secretary until 2015. He was vice chair of the board of directors of the Nobel Foundation from 2010 until 2022. He is a scientific advisor to Humanitas University in Milan, the Centre of Molecular Inflammation Research in Trondheim, and the Leducq Foundation.
