= Isak Jundell =

Russian-born Swedish pediatrician

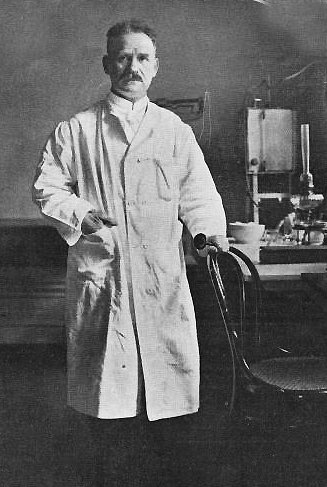
Isak Jundell, 1914

Isak Jundell (born 16 June 1867 in Wladislawów, Russia, died 25 December 1945 in Stockholm), née Jundelsky, was a Russian-born Swedish pediatrician. He was Professor of Pediatrics at the Karolinska Institute, a member of the Nobel Assembly at the Karolinska Institute and was the first editor-in-chief of Acta Paediatrica.

He was born to a Jewish family in Wladislawów in the Russian Empire (now Lithuania) and moved to Sweden at a young age with his parents. He studied medicine at Karolinska Institute and earned a licentiate's degree in 1895 and a doctoral degree in 1898. He became a docent at Karolinska Institute in 1898 and was appointed as Professor of Pediatrics and Director of the General Child House orphanage and children's clinic in 1914. He was also a member of many governmental committees.

Jundell also held leadership roles in the Swedish Jewish community and was involved in the Swedish part of the Kindertransport effort to rescue Jewish children from 1938.
