= Abdel El Manira =

Moroccan Swedish neuroscientist

- Born: January 28, 1965 (age 61); Rabat, Morocco
- Education: Mohammed V University; Aix-Marseille University
- Known for: Research on neural circuits for movement and locomotion
- Awards: Elite Research Award (2003); Distinguished Professor Grant (2017); Commander of the National Order of Merit (Morocco); Knight of the Order of the Throne (Morocco); Distinguished Professor Award (Karolinska Institute); European Research Council Advanced Grant
- Scientific career
- Fields: Neuroscience
- Workplaces: Karolinska Institute

Abdel El Manira (born 28 January 1965) is a Moroccan-Swedish neuroscientist and distinguished professor at the Karolinska Institute in Stockholm, Sweden. He is widely recognized for his research on the neural circuits that control movement, focusing on how motor circuits in the spinal cord contribute to locomotion and motor behavior. El Manira currently leads the Neurobiology of Motor Actions Laboratory at the Karolinska Institute, where he investigates the fundamental principles of motor circuit organization and function.

== Early life and education ==
El Manira was born in Rabat, Morocco, and holds both Moroccan and Swedish citizenship. He obtained a bachelor's degree in biology from Mohammed V University in Rabat in 1988 and a PhD in neuroscience from Aix-Marseille University in Marseille, France, in 1992. His doctoral work focused on the neural mechanisms underlying movement, laying the foundation for his subsequent research. Following his PhD, he joined the Department of Neuroscience at the Karolinska Institute in Sweden as a postdoctoral researcher.

== Career ==
In 1994, El Manira began his independent research career as an assistant professor at the Karolinska Institute, supported by funding from the Swedish Research Council. In 2003, he received the Elite Research Award and in 2005, he was promoted to full professor of neuroscience. In 2017, he was awarded the Distinguished Professor Grant by the Swedish Research Council. El Manira is a member of the Nobel Assembly at the Karolinska Institute and has been serving as a member of the Nobel Committee for the Nobel Prize in Physiology or Medicine since 2020. Additionally, he has chaired the Scientific Council for Medicine at the Swedish Research Council.

== Research ==
El Manira's research focuses on understanding how neural circuits in the brain and spinal cord coordinate complex motor functions. His team studies the interplay between these circuits to produce precise and adaptable movements. A key contribution of his work is the discovery of modular circuit organization within the spinal cord, which functions as an intrinsic "gear shift" for controlling movement speed. His lab identified a three-part circuit module that enables animals to transition smoothly between different speeds through the activation of specific neuronal pathways.

El Manira's research has also demonstrated that motor neurons play active roles within central pattern generators (CPGs)—the neural networks responsible for rhythmic movements. His findings highlight the dual role of motor neurons as both initiators and participants in motor control, offering a revised understanding of CPG function in motor behavior. Additionally, his lab discovered the first known intraspinal proprioceptive organ composed of Piezo2^{+} neurons, identifying a new class of proprioceptors within the central nervous system. Most recently, his team has identified transcriptomic signatures that organize neuronal subtypes into functional circuit modules controlling locomotor speed, providing new insights into the genetic and molecular profiles underlying motor circuit diversity.

== Awards and honours ==
El Manira is a Commander of the National Order of Merit and a Knight of the Order of the Throne from Morocco. He was elected to the Hassan II Academy of Sciences and Technologies in Morocco in 2013, the Royal Swedish Academy of Sciences in 2015, and the Academia Europaea in 2017. Additionally, he has received the Distinguished Professor Award from the Karolinska Institute and the European Research Council Advanced Grant.
