= Klas Kärre =

Swedish immunologist (born 1954)

Klas Kärre (born January 12, 1954, in Strasbourg, France) is a Swedish immunologist. He was elected a Member of the National Academy of Sciences in 2025.

Kärre received his doctorate in 1981 at Karolinska Institutet and is a professor of molecular immunology at Karolinska Institutet since 1993.

In the mid-1980s Kärre discovered one of the mechanisms for how cells of the immune system, natural killer cells (NK cells), identify their target cells and kill them. The findings were that the NK cells are inhibited by a transplantation antigen, the major histocompatibility complex (MHC) class I, which prevents NK cells from killing their target cells. When MHC class I is removed from the target cells, they are killed by the NK cells. Kärre named this phenomenon "the missing self hypothesis".

Kärre became a member of the Nobel Committee for Physiology or Medicine in 2006 and its chairman in 2009. In 2009, he was elected a member of the Royal Swedish Academy of Sciences. Kärre is a member of the council for the Lindau Nobel Laureate Meetings.

In 1998, he was presented with the William B. Coley Award.
