= Arvid Wallgren =

Swedish pediatrician (1889–1973)

Arvid Wallgren (born 1889, died 1973) was a Swedish pediatrician. He was Professor of Pediatrics at the Karolinska Institute, a member of the Nobel Assembly at the Karolinska Institute and editor-in-chief of Acta Paediatrica from 1950 til 1964.

Wallgren graduated as a physician in 1914 and earned his doctoral degree in 1918. In 1921 he became a docent (reader) in practical medicine at Uppsala University and he was director of Gothenburg Children's Hospital from 1922 to 1942. In 1933 the Swedish government awarded him the title of professor (professors namn), a rare honour not tied to a specific university. From 1943 until his retirement in 1956 he was Professor of Pediatrics at the Karolinska Institute. From 1943 to 1951 he was additionally director of the Children's Clinic at Norrtull Hospital in Stockholm. From 1951 to 1956 he was director of the new Children's Clinic of Karolinska University Hospital.

== Honours ==
- Member of the Academy of Sciences Leopoldina (1940)
