= Acta Paediatrica =

- Discipline: Paediatrics
- Language: English
- Edited by: Hugo Lagercrantz

Publication details
- Former name: Acta Paediatrica Scandinavica
- History: 1921–present
- Publisher: Wiley-Blackwell
- Frequency: Monthly
- Impact factor: 2.4 (2023)

Standard abbreviations
- ISO 4: Acta Paediatr.

Indexing
- CODEN: APAEEL
- ISSN: 0803-5253 (print); 1651-2227 (web)
- OCLC no.: 25266094

Links
- Journal homepage; Online access; Online archive

Acta Paediatrica is a monthly peer-reviewed medical journal covering paediatrics. It is published by Wiley-Blackwell on behalf of the Foundation Acta Paediatrica, based at the Karolinska Institute in Sweden.

== History ==
The journal was established in 1921 and renamed Acta Paediatrica Scandinavica in 1964, returning to its original title in 1992. The journal was conceived as a general pediatrics journal and its original aim was to "give studies from the Nordic countries a worldwide audience." Thus the journal was originally trilingual, publishing papers in English, German, and French, at a time when most medical journals were still published in national languages; the journal later became an English-only journal. Since Rolf Zetterström became editor in the 1960s, the journal increasingly also published studies from outside the Nordic countries. At the end of Zetterström's tenure as editor in the early 2000s, nearly two thirds of papers were authored by non-Nordic researchers.

The journal is owned by the non-profit Foundation Acta Paediatrica, which is hosted by the Karolinska Institute, where all the editors-in-chief have been professors and the editorial office has always been based. The journal was published on behalf of the foundation by the Swedish publisher Almqvist & Wiksell from 1921 to 1992, by the Norwegian publisher Universitetsforlaget from 1992 to 2000, by Taylor & Francis from 2000 to 2007, and by Blackwell Publishing (later Wiley-Blackwell) from 2007.

In addition to its ordinary issues the journal has published nearly 500 supplements, primarily doctoral dissertations authored by paediatricians from the Nordic countries in the early to mid 20th century.

== Abstracting and indexing ==
The journal is abstracted and indexed in:

- Biological Abstracts
- BIOSIS Previews
- Chemical Abstracts Service
- Current Contents/Life Sciences
- Current Contents/Clinical Medicine
- EBSCO databases
- Elsevier Biobase
- Embase
- Global Health
- Index Medicus/MEDLINE/PubMed
- ProQuest databases
- Science Citation Index
- Scopus

According to the Journal Citation Reports, the journal has a 2023 impact factor of 2.4, and is ranked as 46 of 186 paediatrics journals.

== Editors-in-chief ==
The following persons are or have been editor-in-chief:

- Isak Jundell, 1921–1945
- Adolf Lichtenstein, 1945–1950
- Arvid Wallgren, 1950–1964
- Rolf Zetterström, 1965–2005
- Hugo Lagercrantz, 2005–present
