= Wahlgren =

Wahlgren is a Swedish surname. Notable people with the surname include:

- Daniel Wahlgren (born 1966), Swedish rapper
- Hans Wahlgren (1937–2024), Swedish actor
- Kari Wahlgren (born 1977), American voice actress
- Laila Bagge Wahlgren (born 1972), Swedish singer, manager and songwriter
- Lars-Anders Wahlgren (born 1966), Swedish tennis player
- Lars-Eric Wahlgren (1929–1999), Swedish lieutenant general
- Linus Wahlgren (born 1976), Swedish actor
- Marie Wahlgren (born 1962), Swedish Liberal People's Party politician
- Niclas Wahlgren (born 1965), Swedish actor, singer and presenter
- Pernilla Wahlgren (born 1967), Swedish singer and actress

== See also ==
- Walgreen (disambiguation)
- Wallgren
