= Walgreen =

Walgreen may refer to:

- Charles Rudolph Walgreen
- Charles Rudolph Walgreen Jr.
- Walgreens Boots Alliance Holding company
  - The Walgreens, aka The Walgreen Company (WAG)
  - Walgreens Health Services (WHS), a business unit of Walgreens
  - Walgreen Drug Store (Miami, Florida)
- The Walgreen Coast, a portion of the coast of Antarctica

== See also ==
- Wahlgren (disambiguation)
