= Clara Lieber =

Chemist (1902–1982)

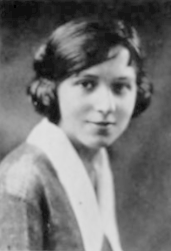
- In the Smith College yearbook, 1923
- Born: Clara Flora Lieber; July 10, 1902; Indianapolis, Indiana, US
- Died: December 14, 1982 (aged 80); Indianapolis, Indiana, US
- Burial place: Crown Hill Cemetery and Arboretum, Section 27, Lot 132; 39.8196963°N 86.1758237°W
- Education: Smith College; University College London
- Occupation: Chemist
- Spouse: Otto Nothhacksberger

Clara Flora Lieber (July 10, 1902 – December 14, 1982) was an American chemist known for her work with Otto Hahn on discovering fission, and her discovery of several isotopes of strontium and barium.

== Early life and education ==
Born in Indianapolis, Indiana, to Clara and Robert Lieber, she attended local schools, including Shortridge High School, in her early life. She had one sibling, Louise Lieber. Clara Lieber attended Smith College and earned an associate degree in 1923, the University of Chicago during the summer of 1924, and University College London, where she earned a bachelor's degree in 1936.

== Career and research ==
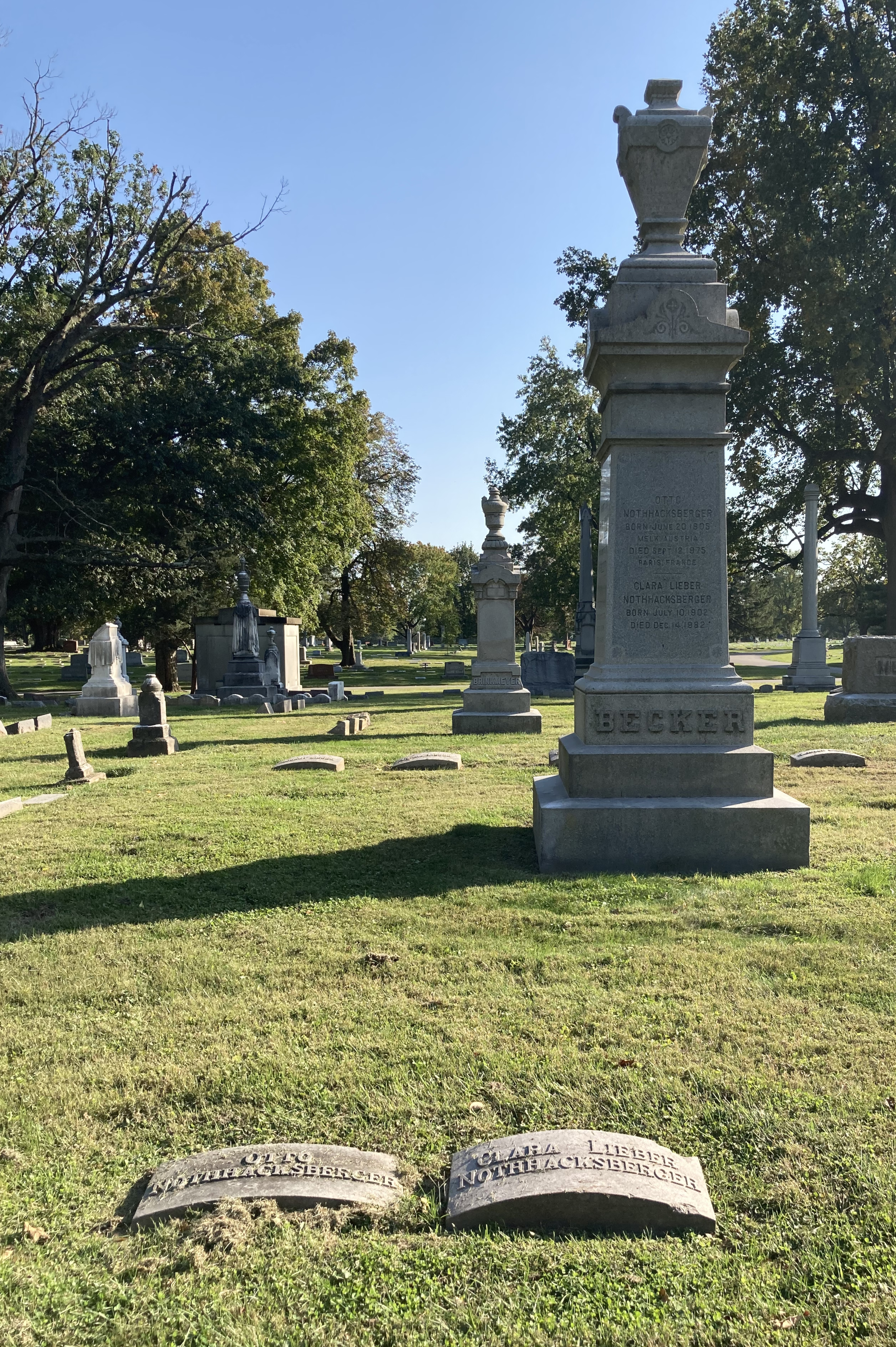
Lieber's grave at Crown Hill Cemetery

After graduating from University College London, Lieber became a doctoral student at the Kaiser-Wilhelm Institute in 1936. She studied barium and strontium extensively, discovered several isotopes of both elements, and used radiochemistry to investigate barium and strontium dehydration reactions. She also discovered that uranium could decay into strontium and xenon. With Otto Hahn and Fritz Strassmann, she conducted research that led to the discovery of fission and fission products. In 1939, she returned to the United States without a Ph.D. She married Otto Nothhacksberger after the war and served on the Committee for the Resettlement of Japanese-Americans. She was a member of Phi Beta Kappa. Unfortunately, there are no widely known references or historical records crediting Clara Lieber's scientific contributions. She died at Indiana University Medical Center on December 14, 1982, and was buried at Crown Hill Cemetery.
