= Göran Liljestrand =

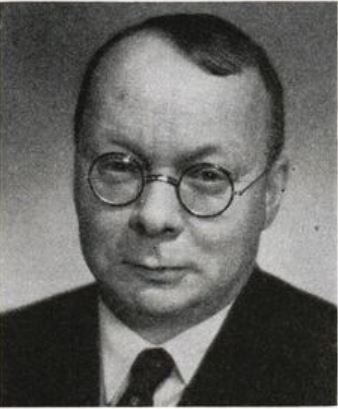
Göran Liljestrand

Göran Liljestrand (16 April 1886 – 16 January 1968), Swedish pharmacologist, known for the discovery of the Euler-Liljestrand mechanism.

Liljestrand was born in Gothenburg but finished school at the Norra Real school in Stockholm, before matriculating at the University College of Stockholm in 1904. He continued his studies at the Karolinska Institute, completed his medicine kandidat degree in 1909, the Licentiate of Medical Science (Medicine licentiatexamen) degree in 1915, and his doctorate in 1917, becoming docent of physiology at the Institute the same year. He held the professorship in pharmacology and physiology at the Karolinska Institute from 1927 to 1951.

Liljestrand was trained as a physiologist under Professor Jöns Johansson but became known mainly as a pharmacologist and for his cooperation with Ulf von Euler (later Nobel laureate of Medicine and Physiology) and Yngve Zotterman. He was secretary of the Nobel Committee of the Karolinska Institute for 40 years. In 1938, he was made a member of the Royal Swedish Academy of Sciences.

== See also ==
- Euler-Liljestrand mechanism
