= Nobel Committee =

Working bodies that help select Nobel Prize laureates

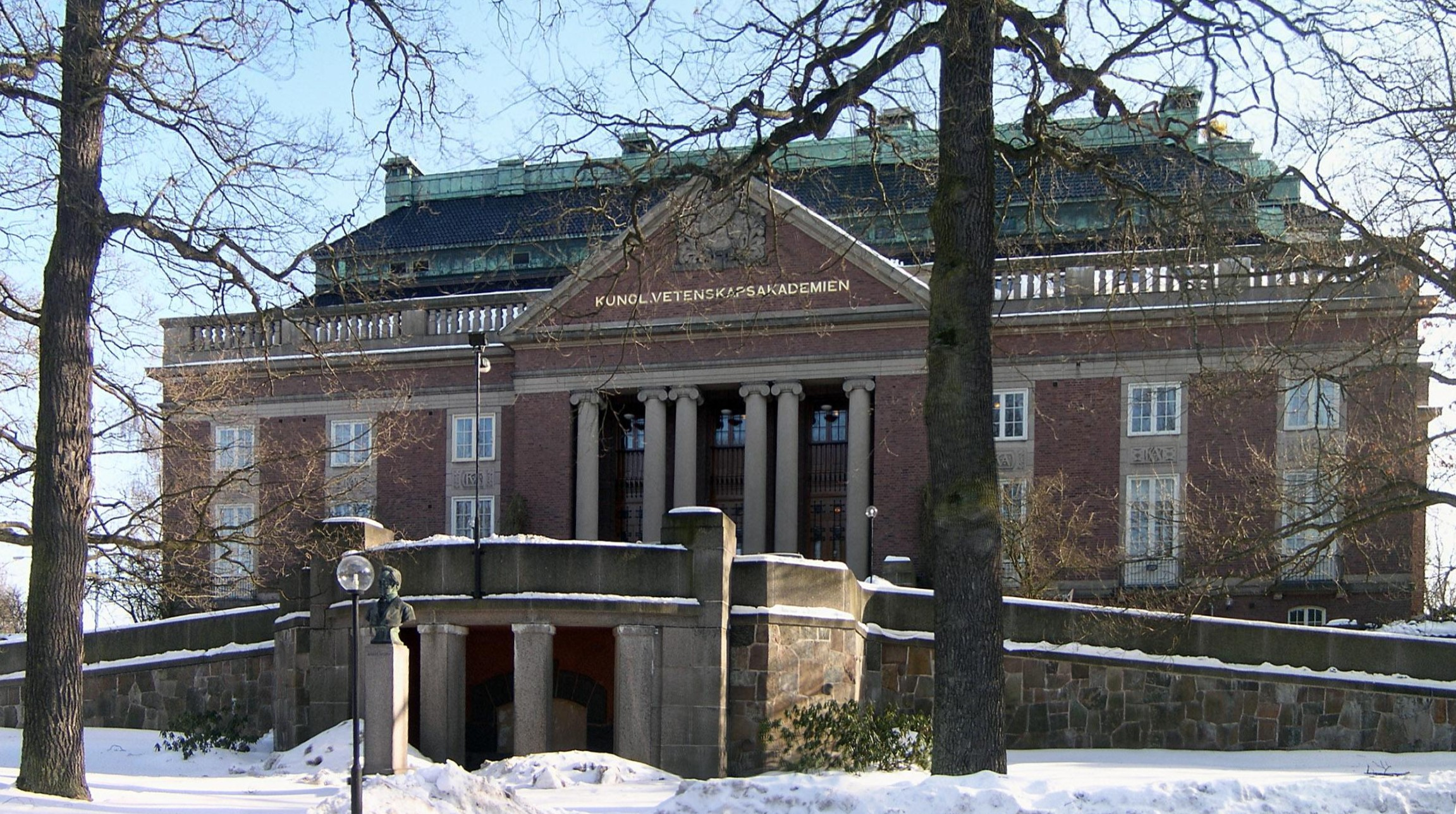
Two of the Nobel Committees, those for physics and chemistry, as well as the Prize Committee for economics, are located at the Royal Swedish Academy of Sciences.

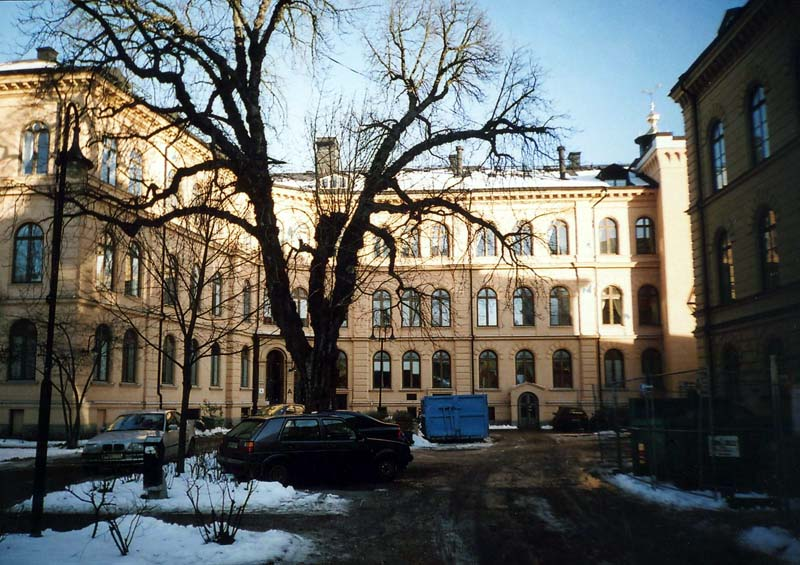
The Nobel Committee for Physiology or Medicine is located at the Karolinska Institute.

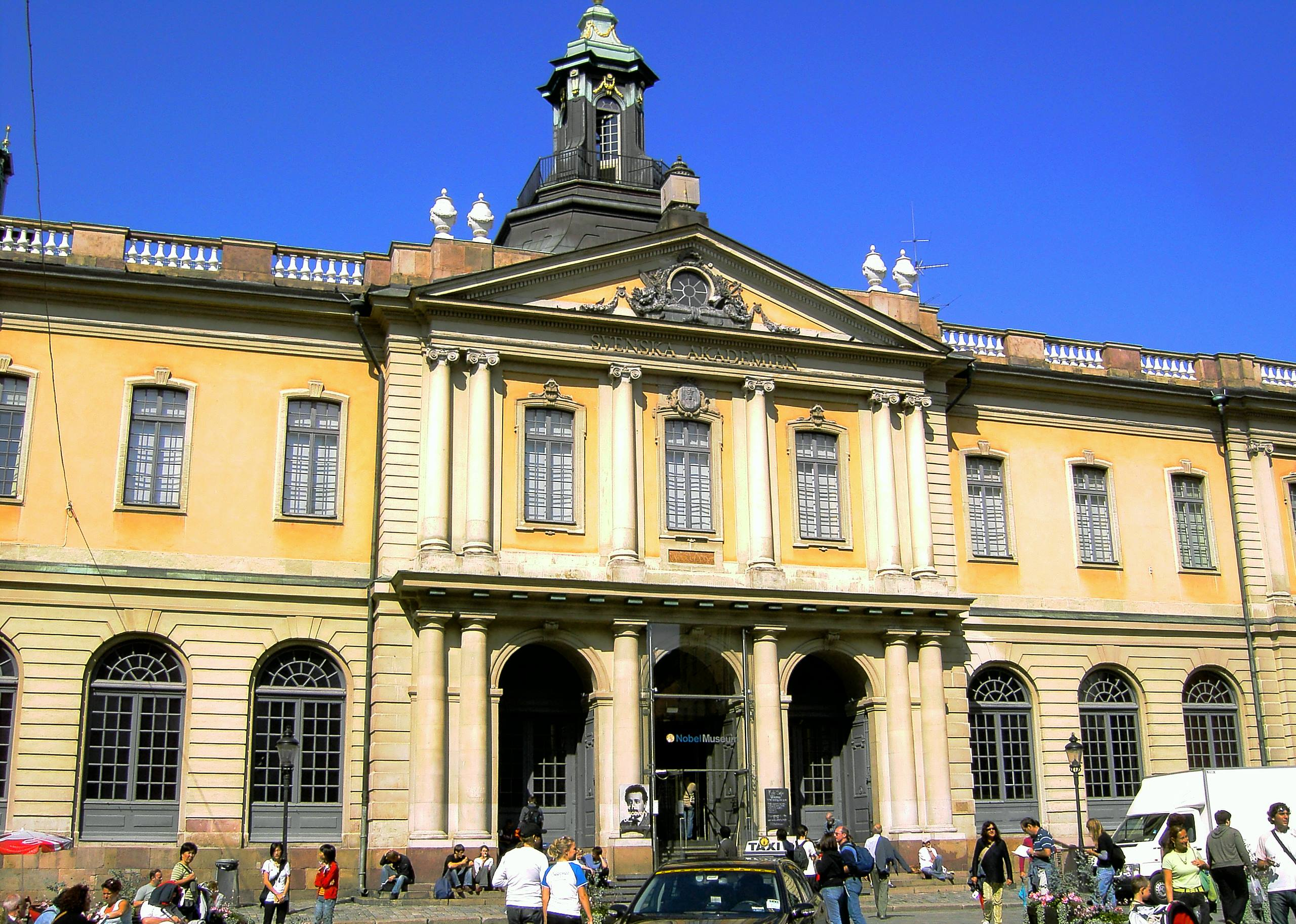
The Nobel Committee for Literature is located at the Swedish Academy.

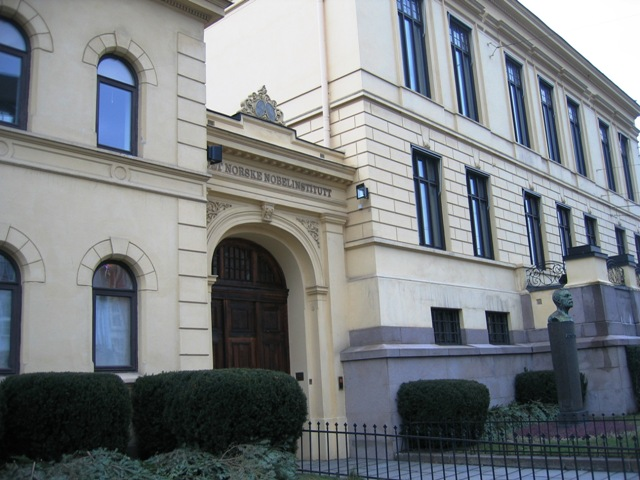
The Norwegian Nobel Committee, appointed by the Storting, has its own supporting body in the form of the Norwegian Nobel Institute.

A Nobel Committee is a working body responsible for most of the work involved in selecting Nobel Prize laureates. There are six awarding committees from four institutions, one for each Nobel Prize.

Five of these committees are working bodies within three prize awarding institutions: the Royal Swedish Academy of Sciences (for prizes in physics, chemistry, and economic sciences), the Karolinska Institute (for prize in physiology or medicine) and the Swedish Academy (for prize in literature). These Nobel Committees only propose laureates, while the final decision is taken in a larger assembly. This assembly is composed of the entire academies for the prizes in physics, chemistry, economic sciences and literature, as well as the 50 members of the Nobel Assembly at the Karolinska Institute for the prize in physiology or medicine.

The sixth Nobel Committee is the Norwegian Nobel Committee, responsible for the Nobel Peace Prize. This committee has a different status since it is both the working body and the deciding body for its prize.

== See also ==
- Nobel Committee for Physics
- Nobel Committee for Chemistry
- Nobel Committee for Physiology or Medicine
- Nobel Committee for Literature
- Norwegian Nobel Committee
- Economic Sciences Prize Committee
