= Nobel Assembly at the Karolinska Institute =

Body at Karolinska Institute that awards a Nobel Prize

- Nobelförsamlingen vid Karolinska Institutet
- Formation: 1901; 13 March 1978 (as a formal body)
- Headquarters: Stockholm, Sweden
- Members: 50 members
- Chairman: Jesper Haeggström
- Deputy Chairman: Eva Hellström Lindberg
- Website: nobelprizemedicine.org

The Nobel Assembly at the Karolinska Institute is a body at Karolinska Institute that awards the Nobel Prize in Physiology or Medicine. It is headquartered in the Nobel Forum on the grounds of the Karolinska Institute campus. Originally, the Nobel Assembly was not a formal body but rather the collective of all professors (holders of chairs, i.e., full professors) at Karolinska Institute. In 1977, the Nobel Assembly became a separate private organization hosted by Karolinska Institute. Until 1984, all Karolinska Institute professors belonged to the Assembly; since 1984, the membership has been restricted to 50 Karolinska Institute professors.

The main work involved in collecting nominations and screening nominees is performed by the Nobel Committee at the Karolinska Institute, which has five members. The Nobel Committee, which is appointed by the Nobel Assembly, is only empowered to recommend laureates, while the final decision rests with the Nobel Assembly.

== Background ==
The Nobel Prize in Physiology or Medicine was first awarded in 1901. For most of the 20th century the laureates were decided upon by all professors of the Karolinska Institute, collectively sometimes also referred to as the Nobel Assembly. In 1977 the Nobel Assembly was established as a separate private organization. The reason for creating a special formal body for the decisions concerning the Nobel Prize was that the Karolinska Institute is a state-run university, which in turn means that it is subject to various laws that apply to government agencies in Sweden and similar Swedish public sector organisations, such as freedom of information legislation. By moving the actual decision making to a private body at Karolinska Institute (but not part of it), it is possible to follow the regulations for the Nobel Prize set down by the Nobel Foundation, including keeping the confidentiality of all documents and proceedings for a minimum of 50 years. Also, the legal possibility of contesting the decisions in e.g. administrative courts is removed. Until 1984, all professors at Karolinska Institute were members of the Assembly, but in 1984, the membership was restricted to 50 Karolinska professors.

The other two Nobel Prize-awarding bodies in Sweden, the Royal Swedish Academy of Sciences and the Swedish Academy, are legally private organisations (although enjoying royal patronage), and have therefore not had to make any special arrangements to be able to follow the Nobel Foundation's regulations.
