= Isotopes of oganesson =

Isotopes of oganesson (_{118}Og)
Main isotopes			Decay	
Isotope	abundance	half-life (t_{1/2})	mode	product
^{294}Og	synth	0.7 ms	α	^{290}Lv
^{294}Og	synth	0.7 ms	SF	–

Oganesson (_{118}Og) is a synthetic element created in particle accelerators, and thus a standard atomic weight cannot be given. Like all synthetic elements, it has no stable isotopes. The first and only isotope to be synthesized was ^{294}Og in 2002 and 2005; it has a half-life of 0.7 milliseconds.

== List of isotopes ==
Nuclide	Z	N	Isotopic mass (Da) (Note: ( ) – Uncertainty (1σ) is given in concise form in parentheses after the corresponding last digits.) (Note: # – Atomic mass marked #: value and uncertainty derived not from purely experimental data, but at least partly from trends from the Mass Surface (TMS).)	Discovery year	Half-life	Decay mode	Daughter isotope	Spin and parity
^{294}Og	118	176	294.21398(59)#	2006	0.58+0.44 −0.18 ms [0.7(3) ms]	α	^{290}Lv	0+
This table header & footer:

== Nucleosynthesis ==
=== Target-projectile combinations leading to Z=118 compound nuclei ===
The below table contains various combinations of targets and projectiles that could be used to form compound nuclei with Z=118.

Target	Projectile	CN	Attempt result
^{208}Pb	^{86}Kr	^{294}Og	Failure to date
^{238}U	^{58}Fe	^{296}Og	Reaction yet to be attempted
^{244}Pu	^{54}Cr	^{298}Og	Reaction yet to be attempted
^{248}Cm	^{50}Ti	^{298}Og	Failure to date
^{250}Cm	^{50}Ti	^{300}Og	Reaction yet to be attempted
^{249}Cf	^{48}Ca	^{297}Og	Successful reaction
^{250}Cf	^{48}Ca	^{298}Og	Failure to date
^{251}Cf	^{48}Ca	^{299}Og	Failure to date
^{252}Cf	^{48}Ca	^{300}Og	Reaction yet to be attempted

=== Cold fusion ===
==== ^{208}Pb(^{86}Kr,xn)^{294-x}Og ====
In 1999, a team led by Victor Ninov at the Lawrence Berkeley National Laboratory performed this experiment, as a 1998 calculation by Robert Smolańczuk suggested a promising outcome. After eleven days of irradiation, three events of ^{293}Og and its alpha decay products were reported in this reaction; this was the first reported discovery of element 118 and then-unknown element 116.

The following year, they published a retraction after researchers at other laboratories were unable to duplicate the results and the Berkeley lab could not duplicate them either. In June 2002, the director of the lab announced that the original claim of the discovery of these two elements had been based on data fabricated by principal author Victor Ninov. Newer experimental results and theoretical predictions have confirmed the exponential decrease in cross-sections with lead and bismuth targets as the atomic number of the resulting nuclide increases.

=== Hot fusion ===
==== ^{249}Cf(^{48}Ca,xn)^{297-x}Og (x=3) ====
Following successful experiments utilizing calcium-48 projectiles and actinide targets to generate elements 114 and 116, the search for element 118 was first performed at the Joint Institute for Nuclear Research (JINR) in 2002. One or two atoms of ^{294}Og were produced in the 2002 experiment, and two more atoms were produced in a 2005 confirmation run. The discovery of element 118 was announced in 2006.

Because of the very small fusion reaction probability (the fusion cross section is roughly 0.3–0.6 pb), the experiment took four months and involved a beam dose of 2.5×10^{19} calcium ions that had to be shot at the californium target to produce the first recorded event believed to be the synthesis of oganesson. Nevertheless, researchers were highly confident that the results were not a false positive; the chance that they were random events was estimated to be less than one part in 100,000.

In a 2012 experiment aimed at the confirmation of tennessine, one alpha decay chain was attributed to ^{294}Og. This synthesis event resulted from the population of ^{249}Cf in the target as the decay product of the ^{249}Bk target (half-life 330 days); the cross section and decays were consistent with previously reported observations of ^{294}Og.

From 1 October 2015 until 6 April 2016, the team at the JINR conducted a search for new isotopes of oganesson using a ^{48}Ca beam and a target comprising a mixture of ^{249}Cf (50.7%), ^{250}Cf (12.9%), and ^{251}Cf (36.4%). The experiment was performed at 252 MeV and 258 MeV beam energies. One event of ^{294}Og was found at the lower beam energy, while no decays of oganesson isotopes were found at the higher beam energy; a cross section of 0.9 pb for the ^{249}Cf(^{48}Ca,3n) reaction was estimated.

==== ^{250,251}Cf(^{48}Ca,xn)^{298,299-x}Og ====
In the 2015–2016 experiment, these reactions were performed in a search for ^{295}Og and ^{296}Og. No events attributable to a reaction with the ^{250}Cf or ^{251}Cf portions of the target were found. A repeat of this experiment was planned for 2017–2018.

==== ^{248}Cm(^{50}Ti,xn)^{298-x}Og ====
This reaction was originally planned to be tested at the JINR and RIKEN in 2017–2018, as it uses the same ^{50}Ti projectile as planned experiments leading to elements 119 and 120. A search at RIKEN using this reaction (with the 3n, 4n, and 5n channels leading respectively to ^{295}Og, ^{294}Og, and ^{293}Og) was unsuccessful. The experiment ran for 39 days in 2017, before it was paused to search for element 119 in the ^{248}Cm(^{51}V,xn)^{299−x}119 reaction instead. An upper limit of 0.50 pb for the cross-section was obtained; this is the same cross-section for the successful ^{249}Cf(^{48}Ca,3n)^{294}Og reaction (0.5+1.6
−0.3 pb) and an order of magnitude greater than the theoretical cross-section for the ^{50}Ti reaction (50 fb). This is consistent with the experimental cross-sections of ^{48}Ca- and ^{50}Ti-induced reactions yielding livermorium isotopes. The RIKEN team estimates that the necessary sensitivity level for the production of oganesson isotopes in the ^{248}Cm+^{50}Ti reaction could be reached with 50 days of irradiation at a 1 pμA mean intensity, which is realistically achievable given the technological possibilities available at experimental facilities in 2025.

== Theoretical calculations ==
Theoretical calculations suggest that some oganesson isotopes containing several more neutrons than the synthesized ^{294}Og may have slightly longer half-lives, namely those up to and including ^{302}Og, which is predicted to have a magic number of neutrons in its nucleus.

=== Theoretical calculations on evaporation cross sections ===
The below table contains various targets-projectile combinations for which calculations have provided estimates for cross section yields from various neutron evaporation channels. The channel with the highest expected yield is given.

DNS = Di-nuclear system; 2S = Two-step; σ = cross section

Target	Projectile	CN	Channel (product)	σ _{max}	Model	Ref
^{208}Pb	^{86}Kr	^{294}Og	1n (^{293}Og)	0.1 pb	DNS	
^{208}Pb	^{85}Kr	^{293}Og	1n (^{292}Og)	0.18 pb	DNS	
^{246}Cm	^{50}Ti	^{296}Og	3n (^{293}Og)	40 fb	2S	
^{244}Cm	^{50}Ti	^{294}Og	2n (^{292}Og)	53 fb	2S	
^{252}Cf	^{48}Ca	^{300}Og	3n (^{297}Og)	1.2 pb	DNS	
^{251}Cf	^{48}Ca	^{299}Og	3n (^{296}Og)	1.2 pb	DNS	
^{249}Cf	^{48}Ca	^{297}Og	3n (^{294}Og)	0.3 pb	DNS	
