= Livermore =

Livermore may refer to:

== Places in the United States ==
- Livermore, California
  - Lawrence Livermore National Laboratory, a U.S. Department of Energy lab in Livermore, California
  - Livermore Valley AVA, California wine region in Alameda County
- Livermore, Colorado
- Livermore, Iowa
- Livermore, Kentucky
  - Livermore Bridge, south of Livermore, Kentucky
- Livermore, Maine
- Livermore Falls, Maine
- Livermore, New Hampshire
- Livermore, Pennsylvania

== Other uses ==
- Livermore (surname)

== See also ==
- Livermere (disambiguation)
- Livermorium, element 116, named after the laboratory (and the city)
- Justice Livermore (disambiguation)
- Liverpool (disambiguation)
