= Isotopes of livermorium =

Isotopes of livermorium (_{116}Lv)
Main isotopes			Decay	
Isotope	abundance	half-life (t_{1/2})	mode	product
^{290}Lv	synth	8.3 ms	α	^{286}Fl
^{290}Lv	synth	8.3 ms	SF	–
^{291}Lv	synth	19 ms	α	^{287}Fl
^{292}Lv	synth	16 ms	α	^{288}Fl
^{293}Lv	synth	57 ms	α	^{289}Fl
^{293m}Lv	synth	20 ms	α	?

Livermorium (_{116}Lv) is a synthetic element, and thus a standard atomic weight cannot be given. Like all artificial elements, it has no stable isotopes. The first isotope to be synthesized was ^{293}Lv in 2000. There are six known radioisotopes, with mass numbers 288–293, as well as a few suggestive indications of a possible heavier isotope ^{294}Lv. The longest-lived known isotope is ^{293}Lv with a half-life of 57 ms.

== List of isotopes ==
Nuclide (Note: ^{m}Lv – Excited nuclear isomer.)	Z	N	Isotopic mass (Da) (Note: ( ) – Uncertainty (1σ) is given in concise form in parentheses after the corresponding last digits.) (Note: # – Atomic mass marked #: value and uncertainty derived not from purely experimental data, but at least partly from trends from the Mass Surface (TMS).)	Discovery year	Half-life (Note: # – Values marked # are not purely derived from experimental data, but at least partly from trends of neighboring nuclides (TNN).)	Decay mode	Daughter isotope	Spin and parity
Nuclide	Excitation energy			Discovery year	Half-life	Decay mode	Daughter isotope	Spin and parity
^{288}Lv	116	172		2025	2.0+2.3 −0.7 ms	α	^{284}Fl	0+
^{289}Lv	116	173	289.19802(54)#	2025	2.4+4.4 −0.9 ms	α	^{285}Fl	
^{290}Lv	116	174	290.19864(59)#	2004	8.3+3.5 −1.9 ms [9(3) ms]	α	^{286}Fl	0+
^{291}Lv	116	175	291.20101(67)#	2004	19+17 −6 ms [26(12) ms]	α	^{287}Fl	
^{292}Lv	116	176	292.20197(82)#	2004	16(6) ms	α	^{288}Fl	0+
^{293}Lv	116	177	293.20458(55)#	2004	57+43 −17 ms [70(30) ms]	α	^{289}Fl	
^{293m}Lv (Note: Discovery of this isomer is unconfirmed)	720(290)# keV			2012	20+96 −9 ms [80(60) ms]	α	^{289m}Fl	
^{294}Lv (Note: Discovery of this isotope is unconfirmed)	116	178		(2017)	54# ms	α ?	^{290}Fl	0+
This table header & footer:

== Nucleosynthesis ==
=== Target-projectile combinations leading to Z=116 compound nuclei ===
The below table contains various combinations of targets and projectiles which could be used to form compound nuclei with atomic number 116.

Target	Projectile	CN	Attempt result
^{208}Pb	^{82}Se	^{290}Lv	Failure to date
^{238}U	^{54}Cr	^{292}Lv	Successful reaction
^{244}Pu	^{50}Ti	^{294}Lv	Successful reaction
^{242}Pu	^{50}Ti	^{292}Lv	Successful reaction
^{250}Cm	^{48}Ca	^{298}Lv	Reaction yet to be attempted
^{248}Cm	^{48}Ca	^{296}Lv	Successful reaction
^{246}Cm	^{48}Ca	^{294}Lv	Reaction yet to be attempted
^{245}Cm	^{48}Ca	^{293}Lv	Successful reaction
^{243}Cm	^{48}Ca	^{291}Lv	Reaction yet to be attempted
^{248}Cm	^{44}Ca	^{292}Lv	Reaction yet to be attempted
^{251}Cf	^{40}Ar	^{291}Lv	Reaction yet to be attempted

=== Cold fusion ===
==== ^{208}Pb(^{82}Se,xn)^{290−x}Lv ====
In 1995, the team at GSI attempted the synthesis of ^{290}Lv as a radiative capture (x=0) product. No atoms were detected during a six-week experimental run, reaching a cross section limit of 3 pb.

=== Hot fusion ===
This section deals with the synthesis of nuclei of livermorium by so-called "hot" fusion reactions. These are processes which create compound nuclei at high excitation energy (~40–50 MeV, hence "hot"), leading to a reduced probability of survival from fission. The excited nucleus then decays to the ground state via the emission of 3–5 neutrons. Fusion reactions utilizing ^{48}Ca nuclei usually produce compound nuclei with intermediate excitation energies (~30–35 MeV) and are sometimes referred to as "warm" fusion reactions. This leads, in part, to relatively high yields from these reactions.

==== ^{238}U(^{54}Cr,xn)^{292−x}Lv (x=4) ====
There are sketchy indications that this reaction was attempted by the team at GSI in 2006. There are no published results on the outcome, presumably indicating that no atoms were detected. This is expected from a study of the systematics of cross sections for ^{238}U targets.

In 2023, this reaction was studied again at the JINR's Superheavy Element Factory in Dubna, in preparation for a future synthesis attempt of element 120 using ^{54}Cr projectiles. One atom of ^{288}Lv was reported; it underwent alpha decay with a lifetime of less than 1 millisecond. The cross-section was measured as 36+46
−24 fb for the 4n channel.

==== ^{244}Pu(^{50}Ti,xn)^{294−x}Lv (x=4) ====
In 2024, this reaction was performed at the LBNL, in preparation for a future synthesis attempt of element 120 using ^{50}Ti projectiles. Two atoms of the known isotope ^{290}Lv were successfully produced. This was the first successful synthesis of a superheavy element using ^{50}Ti projectiles and an actinide target; the cross-section was reported to be 0.44+0.58
−0.28 pb.

==== ^{242}Pu(^{50}Ti,xn)^{292−x}Lv (x=3,4) ====
In 2024, this reaction was studied at the JINR, as a next step after the successful ^{238}U+^{54}Cr reaction. Two atoms of ^{288}Lv were detected, as well as three atoms of the new alpha-decaying isotope ^{289}Lv. One atom of ^{289}Mc was found in the p2n channel, which was the first time any pxn channel had been detected in a reaction of actinides with ^{48}Ca, ^{50}Ti, or ^{54}Cr projectiles. The cross-section was reported to be 320+340
−180 fb for the 3n channel, and 220+270
−150 fb for the 4n channel.

==== ^{248}Cm(^{48}Ca,xn)^{296−x}Lv (x=2?,3,4,5?) ====
The first attempt to synthesise livermorium was performed in 1977 by Ken Hulet and his team at the Lawrence Livermore National Laboratory (LLNL). They were unable to detect any atoms of livermorium. Yuri Oganessian and his team at the Flerov Laboratory of Nuclear Reactions (FLNR) subsequently attempted the reaction in 1978 and met failure. In 1985, a joint experiment between Berkeley and Peter Armbruster's team at GSI, the result was again negative with a calculated cross-section limit of 10–100 pb.

In 2000, Russian scientists at Dubna finally succeeded in detecting a single atom of livermorium, assigned to the isotope ^{292}Lv. In 2001, they repeated the reaction and formed a further 2 atoms in a confirmation of their discovery experiment. A third atom was tentatively assigned to ^{293}Lv on the basis of a missed parental alpha decay. In April 2004, the team ran the experiment again at higher energy and were able to detect a new decay chain, assigned to ^{292}Lv. On this basis, the original data were reassigned to ^{293}Lv. The tentative chain is therefore possibly associated with a rare decay branch of this isotope or an isomer, ^{293m}Lv; given the possible reassignment of its daughter to ^{290}Fl instead of ^{289}Fl, it could also conceivably be ^{294}Lv, although all these assignments are tentative and need confirmation in future experiments aimed at the 2n channel. In this reaction, two additional atoms of ^{293}Lv were detected.

In 2007, in a GSI-SHIP experiment, besides four ^{292}Lv chains and one ^{293}Lv chain, another chain was observed, initially not assigned but later shown to be ^{291}Lv. However, it is unclear whether it comes from the ^{248}Cm(^{48}Ca,5n) reaction or from a reaction with a lighter curium isotope (present in the target as an admixture), such as ^{246}Cm(^{48}Ca,3n).

In an experiment run at the GSI during June–July 2010, scientists detected six atoms of livermorium; two atoms of ^{293}Lv and four atoms of ^{292}Lv. They were able to confirm both the decay data and cross sections for the fusion reaction.

A 2016 experiment at RIKEN aimed at studying the ^{48}Ca+^{248}Cm reaction seemingly detected one atom that may be assigned to ^{294}Lv alpha decaying to ^{290}Fl and ^{286}Cn, which underwent spontaneous fission; however, the first alpha from the livermorium nuclide produced was missed.

==== ^{245}Cm(^{48}Ca,xn)^{293−x}Lv (x=2,3) ====
In order to assist in the assignment of isotope mass numbers for livermorium, in March–May 2003 the Dubna team bombarded a ^{245}Cm target with ^{48}Ca ions. They were able to observe two new isotopes, assigned to ^{291}Lv and ^{290}Lv. This experiment was successfully repeated in February–March 2005 where 10 atoms were created with identical decay data to those reported in the 2003 experiment.

=== As a decay product ===
Livermorium has also been observed in the decay of oganesson. In October 2006 it was announced that three atoms of oganesson had been detected by the bombardment of californium-249 with calcium-48 ions, which then rapidly decayed into livermorium.

The observation of the daughter ^{290}Lv allowed the assignment of the parent to ^{294}Og and confirmed the synthesis of oganesson.

=== Fission of compound nuclei with Z=116 ===
Several experiments have been performed between 2000 and 2006 at the Flerov Laboratory of Nuclear Reactions in Dubna studying the fission characteristics of the compound nuclei ^{296,294,290}Lv. Four nuclear reactions have been used, namely ^{248}Cm+^{48}Ca, ^{246}Cm+^{48}Ca, ^{244}Pu+^{50}Ti, and ^{232}Th+^{58}Fe. The results have revealed how nuclei such as this fission predominantly by expelling closed shell nuclei such as ^{132}Sn (Z = 50, N = 82). It was also found that the yield for the fusion-fission pathway was similar between ^{48}Ca and ^{58}Fe projectiles, indicating a possible future use of ^{58}Fe projectiles in superheavy element formation. In addition, in comparative experiments synthesizing ^{294}Lv using ^{48}Ca and ^{50}Ti projectiles, the yield from fusion-fission was roughly three times smaller for ^{50}Ti, also suggesting a future use in SHE production.

=== Retracted isotopes ===
==== ^{289}Lv ====
In 1999, researchers at Lawrence Berkeley National Laboratory announced the synthesis of ^{293}Og (see oganesson), in a paper published in Physical Review Letters. The claimed isotope ^{289}Lv decayed by 11.63 MeV alpha emission with a half-life of 0.64 ms. The following year, they published a retraction after other researchers were unable to duplicate the results. In June 2002, the director of the lab announced that the original claim of the discovery of these two elements had been based on data fabricated by the principal author Victor Ninov. This isotope of livermorium was finally discovered in 2024 by the JINR, in the ^{242}Pu(^{50}Ti,3n) reaction.

== Yields of isotopes ==
=== Hot fusion ===
The table below provides cross-sections and excitation energies for hot fusion reactions producing livermorium isotopes directly. Data in bold represent maxima derived from excitation function measurements. + represents an observed exit channel.

Projectile	Target	CN	2n	3n	4n	5n
^{48}Ca	^{248}Cm	^{296}Lv		1.1 pb, 38.9 MeV	3.3 pb, 38.9 MeV	
^{48}Ca	^{245}Cm	^{293}Lv	**0.9 pb, 33.0 MeV**	**3.7 pb, 37.9 MeV**		

== Theoretical calculations ==
=== Decay characteristics ===
Theoretical calculation in a quantum tunneling model supports the experimental data relating to the synthesis of ^{293}Lv and ^{292}Lv.

=== Evaporation residue cross sections ===
The below table contains various targets-projectile combinations for which calculations have provided estimates for cross section yields from various neutron evaporation channels. The channel with the highest expected yield is given.

DNS = Di-nuclear system; σ = cross section

Target	Projectile	CN	Channel (product)	σ_{max}	Model	Ref
^{208}Pb	^{82}Se	^{290}Lv	1n (^{289}Lv)	0.1 pb	DNS	
^{208}Pb	^{79}Se	^{287}Lv	1n (^{286}Lv)	0.5 pb	DNS	
^{238}U	^{54}Cr	^{292}Lv	2n (^{290}Lv)	0.1 pb	DNS	
^{250}Cm	^{48}Ca	^{298}Lv	4n (^{294}Lv)	5 pb	DNS	
^{248}Cm	^{48}Ca	^{296}Lv	4n (^{292}Lv)	2 pb	DNS	
^{247}Cm	^{48}Ca	^{295}Lv	3n (^{292}Lv)	3 pb	DNS	
^{245}Cm	^{48}Ca	^{293}Lv	3n (^{290}Lv)	1.5 pb	DNS	
^{243}Cm	^{48}Ca	^{291}Lv	3n (^{288}Lv)	1.53 pb	DNS	
^{248}Cm	^{44}Ca	^{292}Lv	4n (^{288}Lv)	0.43 pb	DNS	
