= Livermore (surname) =

Livermore is a surname. Notable people with the surname include:

- Caroline Sealy Livermore (1885–1968), American conservationist
- Cathy Livermore, New Zealand artist, dancer and educator
- David Livermore (born 1980), English footballer
- David Livermore (microbiologist), British microbiologist
- Doug Livermore (born 1947), English footballer
- Edward St. Loe Livermore (1762–1832), member of the U.S. House of Representatives from Massachusetts's 3rd District in 1807–1809
- Jake Livermore (born 1989), English footballer
- Jesse Lauriston Livermore (1877–1940), American stock trader
- John Livermore (1918–2013), Nevada gold geologist
- Kirsten Livermore (born 1969), Australian politician
- Mary Livermore (1820–1905), American suffragist
- Reg Livermore (born 1938), Australian actor, singer and theatrical performer
- Robert Livermore (1799–1858), English emigrants to Mexico, landowner, the namesake of Livermore, California
- Samuel Livermore (1732–1803), American politician, New Hampshire Supreme Court justice and U.S. Congressman and Senator from that state
- Samuel Livermore (legal writer) (c. 1786–1833), American New Orleans lawyer known for his treatises on agency law and conflict of laws
- Sarah White Livermore (1789-1874), American teacher, writer
- Spencer Livermore, Baron Livermore (born 1975), British politician
- Tracey Lynn Livermore (born 1973), professional name Brandi Love, American pornographic actress
