= Leonard White (Massachusetts politician) =

American politician

Member of the U.S. House of Representatives from Massachusetts's 3rd district
- In office March 4, 1811 – March 3, 1813
- Preceded by: Edward St. Loe Livermore
- Succeeded by: Timothy Pickering

Member of the Massachusetts House of Representatives
- In office 1809–1811

Personal details
- Born: May 3, 1767 Haverhill, Province of Massachusetts Bay, British America
- Died: October 10, 1849 (aged 82) Haverhill, Massachusetts, U.S.
- Party: Federalist
- Education: Harvard University

Leonard White (May 3, 1767 – October 10, 1849) was a United States representative from Massachusetts. He graduated from Harvard University in 1787. On August 21, 1794, White married Mary Dalton of Newbury and he later became a member of the state House of Representatives (1809–11). He was elected as a Federalist to the Twelfth United States Congress (March 4, 1811 – March 3, 1813). He served as town clerk of Haverhill and cashier of the Merrimack Bank of Haverhill (1814-1836), and held many other local offices. He is interred in Pentucket Cemetery.

U.S. House of Representatives
Preceded by Edward St. Loe Livermore	Member of the U.S. House of Representatives from Massachusetts's 3rd congressional district March 4, 1811 – March 3, 1813	Succeeded by Timothy Pickering
