= Livermere =

Livermere is part of the name of two places in Suffolk, England:

- Great Livermere
- Little Livermere

== See also ==
- Livermore
