= Oganesson =

Oganesson, _{118}Og
Oganesson
- Pronunciation: /ˌɒɡəˈnɛsɒn/ (OG-ə-NESS-on); /ˌoʊɡəˈnɛsən/ (OH-gə-NESS-ən)
- Appearance: metallic (predicted)
- Mass number: [294]

Oganesson in the periodic table
Hydrogen																															Helium
Lithium	Beryllium																									Boron	Carbon	Nitrogen	Oxygen	Fluorine	Neon
Sodium	Magnesium																									Aluminium	Silicon	Phosphorus	Sulfur	Chlorine	Argon
Potassium	Calcium															Scandium	Titanium	Vanadium	Chromium	Manganese	Iron	Cobalt	Nickel	Copper	Zinc	Gallium	Germanium	Arsenic	Selenium	Bromine	Krypton
Rubidium	Strontium															Yttrium	Zirconium	Niobium	Molybdenum	Technetium	Ruthenium	Rhodium	Palladium	Silver	Cadmium	Indium	Tin	Antimony	Tellurium	Iodine	Xenon
Caesium	Barium	Lanthanum	Cerium	Praseodymium	Neodymium	Promethium	Samarium	Europium	Gadolinium	Terbium	Dysprosium	Holmium	Erbium	Thulium	Ytterbium	Lutetium	Hafnium	Tantalum	Tungsten	Rhenium	Osmium	Iridium	Platinum	Gold	Mercury (element)	Thallium	Lead	Bismuth	Polonium	Astatine	Radon
Francium	Radium	Actinium	Thorium	Protactinium	Uranium	Neptunium	Plutonium	Americium	Curium	Berkelium	Californium	Einsteinium	Fermium	Mendelevium	Nobelium	Lawrencium	Rutherfordium	Dubnium	Seaborgium	Bohrium	Hassium	Meitnerium	Darmstadtium	Roentgenium	Copernicium	Nihonium	Flerovium	Moscovium	Livermorium	Tennessine	Oganesson
Rn
↑
Og
↓
—
tennessine ← oganesson → ununennium
- Atomic number (Z): 118
- Group: group 18 (noble gases)
- Period: period 7
- Block: p-block
- Electron configuration: [Rn] 5f^{14} 6d^{10} 7s^{2} 7p^{6} (predicted)
- Electrons per shell: 2, 8, 18, 32, 32, 18, 8 (predicted)

Physical properties
- Phase at STP: solid (predicted)
- Melting point: 325 ± 15 K (52 ± 15 °C, 125 ± 27 °F) (predicted)
- Boiling point: 450 ± 10 K (177 ± 10 °C, 350 ± 18 °F) (predicted)
- Density (near r.t.): 7.2 g/cm^{3} (solid, 319 K, calculated)
- when liquid (at m.p.): 6.6 g/cm^{3} (liquid, 327 K, calculated)

Atomic properties
- Oxidation states: common: (none) (−1), (+1), (+2), (+4), (+6)
- Ionization energies: 1st: 860 kJ/mol (calculated); 2nd: 1560 kJ/mol (calculated)
- Atomic radius: empirical: 152 pm (predicted)
- Covalent radius: 157 pm (predicted)

Other properties
- Natural occurrence: synthetic
- Crystal structure: face-centered cubic (fcc) (extrapolated)
- CAS Number: 54144-19-3

History
- Naming: after Yuri Oganessian
- Prediction: Hans Peter Jørgen Julius Thomsen (1895)
- Discovery: Joint Institute for Nuclear Research and Lawrence Livermore National Laboratory (2002)

Isotopes of oganesson
Main isotopes			Decay	
Isotope	abundance	half-life (t_{1/2})	mode	product
^{294}Og	synth	0.7 ms	α	^{290}Lv
^{294}Og	synth	0.7 ms	SF	–

Oganesson is a synthetic chemical element; it has symbol Og and atomic number 118. It was first synthesized in 2002 at the Joint Institute for Nuclear Research (JINR) in Dubna, near Moscow, Russia, by a joint team of Russian and American scientists. In December 2015, it was recognized as one of four new elements by the Joint Working Party of the international scientific bodies IUPAC and IUPAP. It was formally named on 28 November 2016. The name honors the nuclear physicist Yuri Oganessian, who played a leading role in the discovery of the heaviest elements in the periodic table.

Oganesson has the highest atomic number and highest atomic mass of all known elements. On the periodic table of the elements it is a p-block element, a member of group 18, and the last member of period 7. Its only known isotope, oganesson-294, is highly radioactive, with a half-life of 0.7 ms. This half-life is too short for chemical studies. Because of relativistic effects, theoretical studies predict that it would be a solid at room temperature, and significantly reactive, unlike the other members of group 18 (the noble gases).

== Introduction ==
=== Synthesis of superheavy nuclei ===
A graphic depiction of a nuclear fusion reaction. Two nuclei fuse into one, emitting a neutron. Reactions that created new elements to this moment were similar, though varying numbers of neutrons – or alternatively charged particles – may be emitted instead.

A superheavy (Note: In nuclear physics, an element is called heavy if its atomic number is high; lead (element 82) is one example of such a heavy element. The term "superheavy elements" typically refers to elements with atomic number greater than 103 (although there are other definitions, such as atomic number greater than 100 or 112; sometimes, the term is presented an equivalent to the term "transactinide", which puts an upper limit before the beginning of the hypothetical superactinide series). Terms "heavy isotopes" (of a given element) and "heavy nuclei" mean what could be understood in the common language—isotopes of high mass (for the given element) and nuclei of high mass, respectively.) atomic nucleus is created in a nuclear reaction that combines two other nuclei of unequal size (Note: In 2009, a team at the JINR led by Oganessian published results of their attempt to create hassium in a symmetric ^{136}Xe + ^{136}Xe reaction. They failed to observe a single atom in such a reaction, putting the upper limit on the cross section, the measure of probability of a nuclear reaction, as 2.5 pb. In comparison, the reaction that resulted in hassium discovery, ^{208}Pb + ^{58}Fe, had a cross section of ~20 pb (more specifically, 19^{+19}_{-11} pb), as estimated by the discoverers.) into one; roughly, the more unequal the two nuclei in terms of mass, the greater the possibility that the two react. The material made of the heavier nuclei is made into a target, which is then bombarded by the beam of lighter nuclei. Two nuclei can only fuse into one if they are close enough to each other; normally, nuclei (all positively charged) repel each other due to electrostatic repulsion. The strong interaction can overcome this repulsion but only within a very short distance from a nucleus; beam nuclei are thus greatly accelerated in order to make such repulsion insignificant compared to the velocity of the beam nucleus. The energy applied to the beam nuclei to accelerate them can cause them to reach speeds as high as one-tenth of the speed of light. However, if too much energy is applied, the beam nucleus can fall apart.

Coming close enough alone is not enough for two nuclei to fuse: when two nuclei approach each other, they usually remain together for about 10^{−20} seconds and then part ways (not necessarily in the same composition as before the reaction) rather than form a single nucleus. This happens because during the attempted formation of a single nucleus, electrostatic repulsion tears apart the nucleus that is being formed. Each pair of a target and a beam is characterized by its cross section—the probability that fusion will occur if two nuclei approach one another expressed in terms of the transverse area that the incident particle must hit in order for the fusion to occur. (Note: The amount of energy applied to the beam particle to accelerate it can also influence the value of cross section. For example, in the ^{28}_{14}Si + ^{1}_{0}n → ^{28}_{13}Al + ^{1}_{1}p reaction, cross section changes smoothly from 370 mb at 12.3 MeV to 160 mb at 18.3 MeV, with a broad peak at 13.5 MeV with the maximum value of 380 mb.) This fusion may occur as a result of the quantum effect in which nuclei can tunnel through electrostatic repulsion. If the two nuclei can stay close past that phase, multiple nuclear interactions result in redistribution of energy and an energy equilibrium.

External videos
- Visualization of unsuccessful nuclear fusion, based on calculations from the Australian National University

The resulting merger is an excited state—termed a compound nucleus—and thus it is very unstable. To reach a more stable state, the temporary merger may fission without formation of a more stable nucleus. Alternatively, the compound nucleus may eject a few neutrons, which would carry away the excitation energy; if the latter is not sufficient for a neutron expulsion, the merger would produce a gamma ray. This happens in about 10^{−16} seconds after the initial nuclear collision and results in creation of a more stable nucleus. The definition by the IUPAC/IUPAP Joint Working Party (JWP) states that a chemical element can only be recognized as discovered if a nucleus of it exists for at least 10^{−14} seconds. This value was chosen as an estimate of how long it takes a nucleus to acquire electrons and thus display its chemical properties. (Note: This figure also marks the generally accepted upper limit for lifetime of a compound nucleus.)

=== Decay and detection ===
The beam passes through the target and reaches the next chamber, the separator; if a new nucleus is produced, it is carried with this beam. In the separator, the newly produced nucleus is separated from other nuclides (that of the original beam and any other reaction products) (Note: This separation is based on that the resulting nuclei move past the target more slowly then the unreacted beam nuclei. The separator contains electric and magnetic fields whose effects on a moving particle cancel out for a specific velocity of a particle. Such separation can also be aided by a time-of-flight measurement and a recoil energy measurement; a combination of the two may allow to estimate the mass of a nucleus.) and transferred to a surface-barrier detector, which stops the nucleus. The exact location of the upcoming impact on the detector is marked; also marked are its energy and the time of the arrival. The transfer takes about 10^{−6} seconds; in order to be detected, the nucleus must survive this long. The nucleus is recorded again once its decay is registered, and the location, the energy, and the time of the decay are measured.

Stability of a nucleus is provided by the strong interaction. However, its range is very short; as nuclei become larger, its influence on the outermost nucleons (protons and neutrons) weakens. At the same time, the nucleus is torn apart by electrostatic repulsion between protons, and its range is not limited. Total binding energy provided by the strong interaction increases linearly with the number of nucleons, whereas electrostatic repulsion increases with the square of the atomic number, i.e. the latter grows faster and becomes increasingly important for heavy and superheavy nuclei. Superheavy nuclei are thus theoretically predicted and have so far been observed to predominantly decay via decay modes that are caused by such repulsion: alpha decay and spontaneous fission. (Note: Not all decay modes are caused by electrostatic repulsion. For example, beta decay is caused by the weak interaction.) Almost all alpha emitters have over 210 nucleons, and the lightest nuclide primarily undergoing spontaneous fission has 238. In both decay modes, nuclei are inhibited from decaying by corresponding energy barriers for each mode, but they can be tunneled through.

Scheme of an apparatus for creation of superheavy elements, based on the Dubna Gas-Filled Recoil Separator set up in the Flerov Laboratory of Nuclear Reactions in JINR. The trajectory within the detector and the beam focusing apparatus changes because of a dipole magnet in the former and quadrupole magnets in the latter.

Alpha particles are commonly produced in radioactive decays because the mass of an alpha particle per nucleon is small enough to leave some energy for the alpha particle to be used as kinetic energy to leave the nucleus. Spontaneous fission is caused by electrostatic repulsion tearing the nucleus apart and produces various nuclei in different instances of identical nuclei fissioning. As the atomic number increases, spontaneous fission rapidly becomes more important: spontaneous fission partial half-lives decrease by 23 orders of magnitude from uranium (element 92) to nobelium (element 102), and by 30 orders of magnitude from thorium (element 90) to fermium (element 100). The earlier liquid drop model thus suggested that spontaneous fission would occur nearly instantly due to disappearance of the fission barrier for nuclei with about 280 nucleons. The later nuclear shell model suggested that nuclei with about 300 nucleons would form an island of stability in which nuclei will be more resistant to spontaneous fission and will primarily undergo alpha decay with longer half-lives. Subsequent discoveries suggested that the predicted island might be further than originally anticipated; they also showed that nuclei intermediate between the long-lived actinides and the predicted island are deformed, and gain additional stability from shell effects. Experiments on lighter superheavy nuclei, as well as those closer to the expected island, have shown greater than previously anticipated stability against spontaneous fission, showing the importance of shell effects on nuclei. (Note: It was already known by the 1960s that ground states of nuclei differed in energy and shape as well as that certain magic numbers of nucleons corresponded to greater stability of a nucleus. However, it was assumed that there was no nuclear structure in superheavy nuclei as they were too deformed to form one.)

Alpha decays are registered by the emitted alpha particles, and the decay products are easy to determine before the actual decay; if such a decay or a series of consecutive decays produces a known nucleus, the original product of a reaction can be easily determined. (Note: Since mass of a nucleus is not measured directly but is rather calculated from that of another nucleus, such measurement is called indirect. Direct measurements are also possible, but for the most part they have remained unavailable for superheavy nuclei. The first direct measurement of mass of a superheavy nucleus was reported in 2018 at LBNL. Mass was determined from the location of a nucleus after the transfer (the location helps determine its trajectory, which is linked to the mass-to-charge ratio of the nucleus, since the transfer was done in presence of a magnet).) (That all decays within a decay chain were indeed related to each other is established by the location of these decays, which must be in the same place.) The known nucleus can be recognized by the specific characteristics of decay it undergoes such as decay energy (or more specifically, the kinetic energy of the emitted particle). (Note: If the decay occurred in a vacuum, then since total momentum of an isolated system before and after the decay must be preserved, the daughter nucleus would also receive a small velocity. The ratio of the two velocities, and accordingly the ratio of the kinetic energies, would thus be inverse to the ratio of the two masses. The decay energy equals the sum of the known kinetic energy of the alpha particle and that of the daughter nucleus (an exact fraction of the former). The calculations hold for an experiment as well, but the difference is that the nucleus does not move after the decay because it is tied to the detector.) Spontaneous fission, however, produces various nuclei as products, so the original nuclide cannot be determined from its daughters. (Note: Spontaneous fission was discovered by Soviet physicist Georgy Flerov, a leading scientist at JINR, and thus it was a "hobbyhorse" for the facility. In contrast, the LBL scientists believed fission information was not sufficient for a claim of synthesis of an element. They believed spontaneous fission had not been studied enough to use it for identification of a new element, since there was a difficulty of establishing that a compound nucleus had only ejected neutrons and not charged particles like protons or alpha particles. They thus preferred to link new isotopes to the already known ones by successive alpha decays.)

The information available to physicists aiming to synthesize a superheavy element is thus the information collected at the detectors: location, energy, and time of arrival of a particle to the detector, and those of its decay. The physicists analyze this data and seek to conclude that it was indeed caused by a new element and could not have been caused by a different nuclide than the one claimed. Often, provided data is insufficient for a conclusion that a new element was definitely created and there is no other explanation for the observed effects; errors in interpreting data have been made. (Note: For instance, element 102 was mistakenly identified in 1957 at the Nobel Institute of Physics in Stockholm, Stockholm County, Sweden. There were no earlier definitive claims of creation of this element, and the element was assigned a name by its Swedish, American, and British discoverers, nobelium. It was later shown that the identification was incorrect. The following year, RL was unable to reproduce the Swedish results and announced instead their synthesis of the element; that claim was also disproved later. JINR insisted that they were the first to create the element and suggested a name of their own for the new element, joliotium; the Soviet name was also not accepted (JINR later referred to the naming of the element 102 as "hasty"). This name was proposed to IUPAC in a written response to their ruling on priority of discovery claims of elements, signed 29 September 1992. The name "nobelium" remained unchanged on account of its widespread usage.)

== History ==
=== Early speculation ===
The possibility of a seventh noble gas, after helium, neon, argon, krypton, xenon, and radon, was considered almost as soon as the noble gas group was discovered. Danish chemist Hans Peter Jørgen Julius Thomsen predicted in April 1895, the year after the discovery of argon, that there was a whole series of chemically inert gases similar to argon that would bridge the halogen and alkali metal groups: he expected that the seventh of this series would end a 32-element period which contained thorium and uranium and have an atomic weight of 292, close to the 294 now known for the first and only confirmed isotope of oganesson. Danish physicist Niels Bohr noted in 1922 that this seventh noble gas should have atomic number 118 and predicted its electronic structure as 2, 8, 18, 32, 32, 18, 8, matching modern predictions. Following this, German chemist Aristid von Grosse wrote an article in 1965 predicting the likely properties of element 118. It was 107 years from Thomsen's prediction before oganesson was successfully synthesized, although its chemical properties have not been investigated to determine if it behaves as the heavier congener of radon. In a 1975 article, American chemist Kenneth Pitzer suggested that element 118 should be a gas or volatile liquid due to relativistic effects.

=== Unconfirmed discovery claims ===
In late 1998, Polish physicist Robert Smolańczuk published calculations on the fusion of atomic nuclei towards the synthesis of superheavy atoms, including oganesson. His calculations suggested that it might be possible to make element 118 by fusing lead with krypton under carefully controlled conditions, and that the fusion probability (cross section) of that reaction would be close to the lead–chromium reaction that had produced element 106, seaborgium. This contradicted predictions that the cross sections for reactions with lead or bismuth targets would go down exponentially as the atomic number of the resulting elements increased.

In 1999, researchers at Lawrence Berkeley National Laboratory made use of these predictions and announced the discovery of elements 118 and 116, in a paper published in Physical Review Letters, and very soon after the results were reported in Science. The researchers reported that they had performed the reaction

^{208}_{82}Pb + ^{86}_{36}Kr → ^{293}_{118}Og + n.

In 2001, they published a retraction after researchers at other laboratories were unable to duplicate the results and the Berkeley lab could not duplicate them either. In June 2002, the director of the lab announced that the original claim of the discovery of these two elements had been based on data fabricated by principal author Victor Ninov. Newer experimental results and theoretical predictions have confirmed the exponential decrease in cross sections with lead and bismuth targets as the atomic number of the resulting nuclide increases.

=== Discovery reports ===
Radioactive decay pathway of the isotope oganesson-294. The decay energy and average half-life are given for the parent isotope and each daughter isotope. The fraction of atoms undergoing spontaneous fission (SF) is given in green.

The first genuine decay of atoms of oganesson was observed in 2002 at the Joint Institute for Nuclear Research (JINR) in Dubna, Russia, by a joint team of Russian and American scientists. Headed by Yuri Oganessian, a Russian nuclear physicist of Armenian ethnicity, the team included American scientists from the Lawrence Livermore National Laboratory in California. As the decay energy of ^{294}Og matched that of ^{212m}Po, a common impurity produced in fusion reactions aimed at producing superheavy elements, the announcement of the discovery was delayed until after a 2005 confirmatory experiment aimed at producing more oganesson atoms. The 2005 experiment used a different beam energy (251 MeV instead of 245 MeV) and target thickness (0.34 mg/cm^{2} instead of 0.23 mg/cm^{2}). On 9 October 2006, the researchers announced that they had indirectly detected a total of three (possibly four) nuclei of oganesson-294 (one or two in 2002 and two more in 2005) produced via collisions of californium-249 atoms and calcium-48 ions.

^{249}_{98}Cf + ^{48}_{20}Ca → ^{294}_{118}Og + 3 n.

In 2011, IUPAC evaluated the 2006 results of the Dubna–Livermore collaboration and concluded: "The three events reported for the Z = 118 isotope have very good internal redundancy but with no anchor to known nuclei do not satisfy the criteria for discovery".

Because of the very small fusion reaction probability (the fusion cross section is ~0.3–0.6 pb or (3–6)×10^{−41} m^{2}) the experiment took four months and involved a beam dose of 2.5×10^{19} calcium ions that had to be shot at the californium target to produce the first recorded event believed to be the synthesis of oganesson. Nevertheless, researchers were highly confident that the results were not a false positive, since the chance that the detections were random events was estimated to be less than one part in 100000.

In the experiments, the alpha-decay of three atoms of oganesson was observed. A fourth decay by direct spontaneous fission was also proposed. A half-life of 0.89 ms was calculated: ^{294}Og decays into ^{290}Lv by alpha decay. Since there were only three nuclei, the half-life derived from observed lifetimes has a large uncertainty: 0.89+1.07
−0.31 ms.

^{294}_{118}Og → ^{290}_{116}Lv + ^{4}_{2}He

The identification of the ^{294}Og nuclei was verified by separately creating the putative daughter nucleus ^{290}Lv directly by means of a bombardment of ^{245}Cm with ^{48}Ca ions,

^{245}_{96}Cm + ^{48}_{20}Ca → ^{290}_{116}Lv + 3 n,

and checking that the ^{290}Lv decay matched the decay chain of the ^{294}Og nuclei. The daughter nucleus ^{290}Lv is very unstable, decaying with a lifetime of 14 milliseconds into ^{286}Fl, which may experience either spontaneous fission or alpha decay into ^{282}Cn, which will undergo spontaneous fission.

=== Confirmation ===
In December 2015, the Joint Working Party of international scientific bodies International Union of Pure and Applied Chemistry (IUPAC) and International Union of Pure and Applied Physics (IUPAP) recognized the element's discovery and assigned the priority of the discovery to the Dubna–Livermore collaboration. This was on account of two 2009 and 2010 confirmations of the properties of the granddaughter of ^{294}Og, ^{286}Fl, at the Lawrence Berkeley National Laboratory, as well as the observation of another consistent decay chain of ^{294}Og by the Dubna group in 2012. The goal of that experiment had been the synthesis of ^{294}Ts via the reaction ^{249}Bk(^{48}Ca,3n), but the short half-life of ^{249}Bk resulted in a significant quantity of the target having decayed to ^{249}Cf, resulting in the synthesis of oganesson instead of tennessine.

From 1 October 2015 to 6 April 2016, the Dubna team performed a similar experiment with ^{48}Ca projectiles aimed at a mixed-isotope californium target containing ^{249}Cf, ^{250}Cf, and ^{251}Cf, with the aim of producing the heavier oganesson isotopes ^{295}Og and ^{296}Og. Two beam energies at 252 MeV and 258 MeV were used. Only one atom was seen at the lower beam energy, whose decay chain fitted the previously known one of ^{294}Og (terminating with spontaneous fission of ^{286}Fl), and none were seen at the higher beam energy. The experiment was then halted, as the glue from the sector frames covered the target and blocked evaporation residues from escaping to the detectors. The production of ^{293}Og and its daughter ^{289}Lv, as well as the even heavier isotope ^{297}Og, is also possible using this reaction. The isotopes ^{295}Og and ^{296}Og may also be produced in the fusion of ^{248}Cm with ^{50}Ti projectiles. These heavier and likely more stable isotopes may be useful in probing the chemistry of oganesson. A search in 2017 at RIKEN using this reaction was unsuccessful.

=== Naming ===
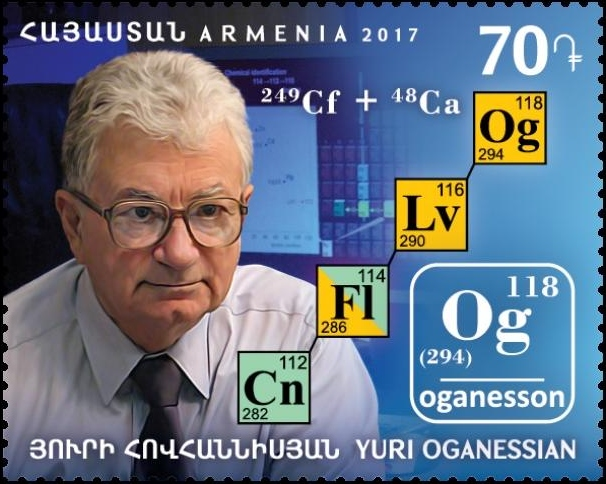
Element 118 was named after Yuri Oganessian, a pioneer in the discovery of synthetic elements, with the name oganesson (Og). Oganessian and the decay chain of oganesson-294 were pictured on a stamp of Armenia issued on 28 December 2017.

Using Mendeleev's nomenclature for unnamed and undiscovered elements, oganesson is sometimes known as eka-radon (until the 1960s as eka-emanation, emanation being the old name for radon). In 1979, IUPAC assigned the systematic placeholder name ununoctium to the undiscovered element, with the corresponding symbol of Uuo, and recommended that it be used until after confirmed discovery of the element. Although widely used in the chemical community on all levels, from chemistry classrooms to advanced textbooks, the recommendations were mostly ignored among scientists in the field, who called it "element 118", with the symbol of E118, (118), or simply 118.

Before the retraction in 2001, the researchers from Berkeley had intended to name the element ghiorsium (Gh), after Albert Ghiorso (a leading member of the research team).

The Russian discoverers reported their synthesis in 2006. According to IUPAC recommendations, the discoverers of a new element have the right to suggest a name. In 2007, the head of the Russian institute stated the team were considering two names for the new element: flyorium, in honor of Georgy Flyorov, the founder of the research laboratory in Dubna; and moskovium, in recognition of the Moscow Oblast where Dubna is located. He also stated that although the element was discovered as an American collaboration, who provided the californium target, the element should rightly be named in honor of Russia since the Flyorov Laboratory of Nuclear Reactions at JINR was the only facility in the world which could achieve this result. These names were later suggested for element 114 (flerovium) and element 116 (moscovium, though that eventually became the name of element 115 instead). Flerovium became the name of element 114; the final name proposed for element 116 was instead livermorium, with moscovium later being proposed and accepted for element 115 instead.

Traditionally, the names of all noble gases end in "-on", with the exception of helium, which was not known to be a noble gas when discovered. The IUPAC guidelines valid at the moment of the discovery approval however required all new elements be named with the ending "-ium", even if they turned out to be halogens (traditionally ending in "-ine") or noble gases (traditionally ending in "-on"). While the provisional name ununoctium followed this convention, a new IUPAC recommendation published in 2016 recommended using the "-on" ending for new group 18 elements, regardless of whether they turn out to have the chemical properties of a noble gas.

The scientists involved in the discovery of element 118, as well as those of 117 and 115, held a conference call on 23 March 2016 to decide their names. Element 118 was the last to be decided upon; after Oganessian was asked to leave the call, the remaining scientists unanimously decided to have the element "oganesson" after him. Oganessian was a pioneer in superheavy element research for sixty years reaching back to the field's foundation: his team and his proposed techniques had led directly to the synthesis of elements 107 through 118. Mark Stoyer, a nuclear chemist at the LLNL, later recalled, "We had intended to propose that name from Livermore, and things kind of got proposed at the same time from multiple places. I don't know if we can claim that we actually proposed the name, but we had intended it."

In internal discussions, IUPAC asked the JINR if they wanted the element to be spelled "oganeson" to match the Russian spelling more closely. Oganessian and the JINR refused this offer, citing the Soviet-era practice of transliterating names into the Latin alphabet under the rules of the French language ("Oganessian" is such a transliteration) and arguing that "oganesson" would be easier to link to the person. (Note: In Russian, Oganessian's name is spelled Оганесян [ˈɐgənʲɪˈsʲan]; the corresponding transliteration would be Oganesyan, with one s. Similarly, the Russian name for the element is оганесон, letter-for-letter oganeson. Oganessian is the Russified version of the Armenian last name Hovhannisyan (Armenian: Հովհաննիսյան [hɔvhɑnnisˈjɑn]). It means "son of Hovhannes", i.e., "son of John". It is one of the most common surnames in Armenia.) In June 2016, IUPAC announced that the discoverers planned to give the element the name oganesson (symbol: Og). The name became official on 28 November 2016. In 2017, Oganessian commented on the naming:

For me, it is an honour. The discovery of element 118 was by scientists at the Joint Institute for Nuclear Research in Russia and at the Lawrence Livermore National Laboratory in the US, and it was my colleagues who proposed the name oganesson. My children and grandchildren have been living in the US for decades, but my daughter wrote to me to say that she did not sleep the night she heard because she was crying.

— Yuri Oganessian

The naming ceremony for moscovium, tennessine, and oganesson was held on 2 March 2017 at the Russian Academy of Sciences in Moscow.

In a 2019 interview, when asked what it was like to see his name in the periodic table next to Einstein, Mendeleev, the Curies, and Rutherford, Oganessian responded:

Not like much! You see, not like much. It is customary in science to name something new after its discoverer. It's just that there are few elements, and this happens rarely. But look at how many equations and theorems in mathematics are named after somebody. And in medicine? Alzheimer, Parkinson. There's nothing special about it.

== Characteristics ==
Other than nuclear properties, no properties of oganesson or its compounds have been measured; this is due to its extremely limited and expensive production and the fact that it decays very quickly. Thus only predictions are available.

=== Nuclear stability and isotopes ===
Oganesson (row 118) is slightly above the "island of stability" (white ellipse) and thus its nuclei are slightly more stable than otherwise predicted.

The stability of nuclei quickly decreases with the increase in atomic number after curium, element 96, whose most stable isotope, ^{247}Cm, has a half-life four orders of magnitude longer than that of any subsequent element. All nuclides with an atomic number above 101 undergo radioactive decay with half-lives shorter than 30 hours. No elements with atomic numbers above 82 (after lead) have stable isotopes. This is because of the ever-increasing Coulomb repulsion of protons, so that the strong nuclear force cannot hold the nucleus together against spontaneous fission for long. Calculations suggest that in the absence of other stabilizing factors, elements with more than 104 protons should not exist. However, researchers in the 1960s suggested that the closed nuclear shells around 114 protons and 184 neutrons should counteract this instability, creating an island of stability in which nuclides could have half-lives reaching thousands or millions of years. While scientists have still not reached the island, the mere existence of the superheavy elements (including oganesson) confirms that this stabilizing effect is real, and in general the known superheavy nuclides become exponentially longer-lived as they approach the predicted location of the island. Oganesson is radioactive, decaying via alpha decay and spontaneous fission, with a half-life that appears to be less than a millisecond. Nonetheless, this is still longer than some predicted values.

Calculations using a quantum-tunneling model predict the existence of several heavier isotopes of oganesson with alpha-decay half-lives close to 1 ms.

Theoretical calculations done on the synthetic pathways for, and the half-life of, other isotopes have shown that some could be slightly more stable than the synthesized isotope ^{294}Og, potentially some among ^{293}Og, ^{295}Og, ^{296}Og, ^{297}Og, ^{298}Og, ^{300}Og and ^{302}Og (the last reaching the N = 184 shell closure). The isotopes from ^{291}Og to ^{295}Og might be produced as daughters of element 120 isotopes that can be reached in the reactions ^{249–251}Cf+^{50}Ti, ^{245}Cm+^{48}Ca, and ^{248}Cm+^{48}Ca.

In a quantum-tunneling model, the alpha decay half-life of ^{294}Og was predicted to be 0.66+0.23
−0.18 ms with the experimental Q-value published in 2004. Calculation with theoretical Q-values from the macroscopic-microscopic model of Muntian–Hofman–Patyk–Sobiczewski gives somewhat lower but comparable results.

=== Calculated atomic and physical properties ===
Oganesson is a member of group 18, the zero-valence elements. The members of this group are usually inert to most common chemical reactions (for example, combustion) because the outer valence shell is completely filled with eight electrons. This produces a stable, minimum energy configuration in which the outer electrons are tightly bound. It is thought that similarly, oganesson has a closed outer valence shell in which its valence electrons are arranged in a 7s^{2}7p^{6} configuration.

Consequently, some expect oganesson to have similar physical and chemical properties to other members of its group, most closely resembling the noble gas above it in the periodic table, radon. Following the periodic trend, oganesson would be expected to be slightly more reactive than radon. However, theoretical calculations have shown that it could be significantly more reactive. In addition to being far more reactive than radon, oganesson may be even more reactive than the elements flerovium and copernicium, which are heavier homologs of the more chemically active elements lead and mercury, respectively. The reason for the possible enhancement of the chemical activity of oganesson relative to radon is an energetic destabilization and a radial expansion of the last occupied 7p-subshell. More precisely, considerable spin–orbit interactions between the 7p electrons and the inert 7s electrons effectively lead to a second valence shell closing at flerovium, and a significant decrease in stabilization of the closed shell of oganesson. It has also been calculated that oganesson, unlike the other noble gases, binds an electron with release of energy, or in other words, it exhibits positive electron affinity, due to the relativistically stabilized 8s energy level and the destabilized 7p_{3/2} level, whereas copernicium and flerovium are predicted to have no electron affinity. Nevertheless, quantum electrodynamic corrections have been shown to be quite significant in reducing this affinity by decreasing the binding in the anion Og^{−} by 9%, thus confirming the importance of these corrections in superheavy elements. 2022 calculations expect the electron affinity of oganesson to be 0.080(6) eV.

Monte Carlo simulations of oganesson's molecular dynamics predict it has a melting point of 325±15 K and a boiling point of 450±10 K due to relativistic effects (if these effects are ignored, oganesson would melt at ≈220 K). Thus oganesson would probably be a solid rather than a gas under standard conditions, though still with a rather low melting point.

Oganesson is expected to have an extremely broad polarizability, almost double that of radon. Because of its tremendous polarizability, oganesson is expected to have an anomalously low first ionization energy of about 860 kJ/mol, similar to that of cadmium and less than those of iridium, platinum, and gold. This is significantly smaller than the values predicted for darmstadtium, roentgenium, and copernicium, although it is greater than that predicted for flerovium. Its second ionization energy should be around 1560 kJ/mol. Even the shell structure in the nucleus and electron cloud of oganesson is strongly impacted by relativistic effects: the valence and core electron subshells in oganesson are expected to be "smeared out" in a homogeneous Fermi gas of electrons, unlike those of the "less relativistic" radon and xenon (although there is some incipient delocalisation in radon), due to the very strong spin–orbit splitting of the 7p orbital in oganesson. A similar effect for nucleons, particularly neutrons, is incipient in the closed-neutron-shell nucleus ^{302}Og and is strongly in force at the hypothetical superheavy closed-shell nucleus ^{472}164, with 164 protons and 308 neutrons. Studies have also predicted that due to increasing electrostatic forces, oganesson may have a semibubble structure in proton density, having few protons at the center of its nucleus. Moreover, spin–orbit effects may cause bulk oganesson to be a semiconductor, with a band gap of 1.5±0.6 eV predicted. All the lighter noble gases are insulators instead: for example, the band gap of bulk radon is expected to be 7.1±0.5 eV.

=== Predicted compounds ===
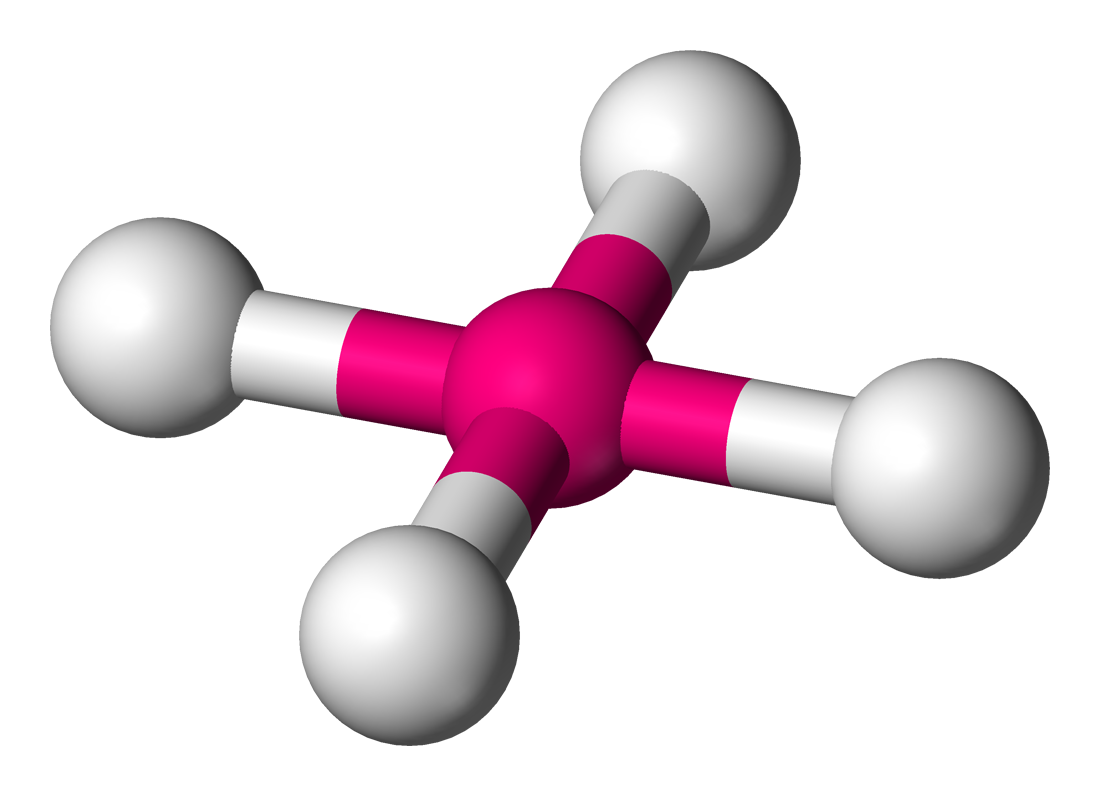
XeF_{4} has a square planar molecular geometry.

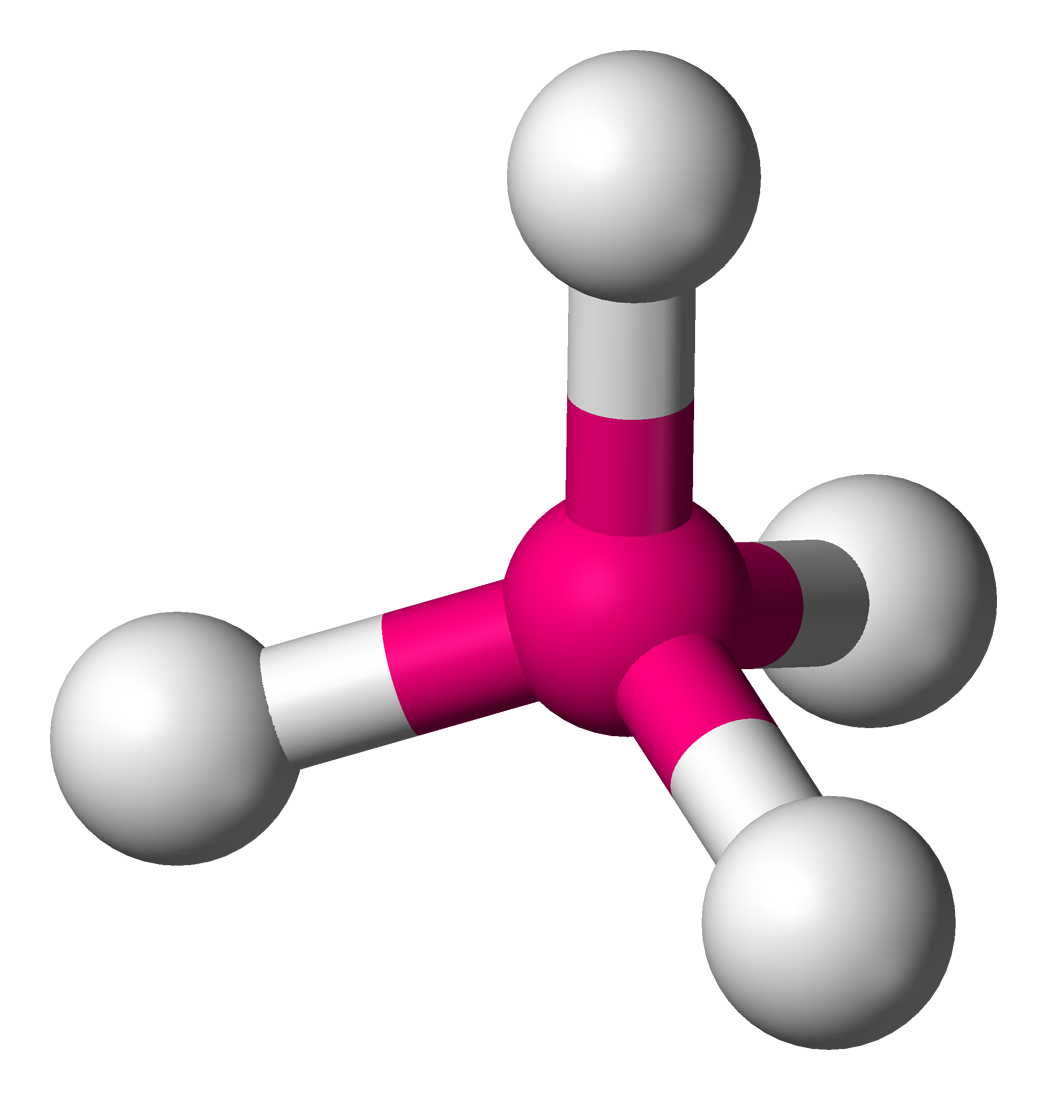
OgF_{4} is predicted to have a tetrahedral molecular geometry.

The only confirmed isotope of oganesson, ^{294}Og, has much too short a half-life to be chemically investigated experimentally. Therefore, no compounds of oganesson have been synthesized yet. Nevertheless, calculations on theoretical compounds have been performed since 1964. It is expected that if the ionization energy of the element is high enough, it will be difficult to oxidize and therefore, the most common oxidation state would be 0 (as for the noble gases); nevertheless, this appears not to be the case.

Calculations on the diatomic molecule Og_{2} showed a bonding interaction roughly equivalent to that calculated for Hg_{2}, and a dissociation energy of 6 kJ/mol, roughly 4 times of that of Rn_{2}. Most strikingly, it was calculated to have a bond length shorter than in Rn_{2} by 0.16 Å, which would be indicative of a significant bonding interaction. On the other hand, the compound OgH^{+} exhibits a dissociation energy (in other words proton affinity of oganesson) that is smaller than that of RnH^{+}.

The bonding between oganesson and hydrogen in OgH is predicted to be very weak and can be regarded as a pure van der Waals interaction rather than a true chemical bond. On the other hand, with highly electronegative elements, oganesson seems to form more stable compounds than for example copernicium or flerovium. The stable oxidation states +2 and +4 have been predicted to exist in the fluorides OgF_{2} and OgF_{4}. The +6 state would be less stable due to the strong binding of the 7p_{1/2} subshell. This is a result of the same spin–orbit interactions that make oganesson unusually reactive. For example, it was shown that the reaction of oganesson with F_{2} to form the compound OgF_{2} would release an energy of 106 kcal/mol of which about 46 kcal/mol come from these interactions. For comparison, the spin–orbit interaction for the similar molecule RnF_{2} is about 10 kcal/mol out of a formation energy of 49 kcal/mol. The same interaction stabilizes the tetrahedral T_{d} configuration for OgF_{4}, as distinct from the square planar D_{4h} one of XeF_{4}, which RnF_{4} is also expected to have; this is because OgF_{4} is expected to have two inert electron pairs (7s and 7p_{1/2}). As such, OgF_{6} is expected to be unbound, continuing an expected trend in the destabilisation of the +6 oxidation state (RnF_{6} is likewise expected to be much less stable than XeF_{6}). The Og–F bond will most probably be ionic rather than covalent, rendering the oganesson fluorides non-volatile. OgF_{2} is predicted to be partially ionic due to oganesson's high electropositivity. Oganesson is predicted to be sufficiently electropositive to form an Og–Cl bond with chlorine.

A compound of oganesson and tennessine, OgTs_{4}, has been predicted to be potentially stable chemically.

== See also ==
- Island of stability – Prediction in nuclear physics
- Superheavy element – Chemical elements with atomic numbers from 104 to 120
- Transuranium element – Element whose atomic number is greater than 92
- Extended periodic table – Periodic table of the elements with eight or more periods

== Bibliography ==
- Audi, G.; Kondev, F. G.; Wang, M.; et al. (2017). "The NUBASE2016 evaluation of nuclear properties". Chinese Physics C. 41 (3) 030001. Bibcode:2017ChPhC..41c0001A. doi:10.1088/1674-1137/41/3/030001.
- Beiser, A. (2003). Concepts of modern physics (6th ed.). McGraw-Hill. ISBN 978-0-07-244848-1. OCLC 48965418.
- Hoffman, D. C.; Ghiorso, A.; Seaborg, G. T. (2000). The Transuranium People: The Inside Story. World Scientific. ISBN 978-1-78-326244-1.
- Kragh, H. (2018). From Transuranic to Superheavy Elements: A Story of Dispute and Creation. Springer. ISBN 978-3-319-75813-8.
- Zagrebaev, V.; Karpov, A.; Greiner, W. (2013). "Future of superheavy element research: Which nuclei could be synthesized within the next few years?". Journal of Physics: Conference Series. 420 (1) 012001. arXiv:1207.5700. Bibcode:2013JPhCS.420a2001Z. doi:10.1088/1742-6596/420/1/012001. ISSN 1742-6588. S2CID 55434734.
