= Liverpool (disambiguation) =

Liverpool is a city in Merseyside, England, historically in Lancashire.

Liverpool may also refer to:

== Places ==
=== Antarctica ===
- Liverpool Beach

=== Australia ===
- Liverpool, New South Wales
  - City of Liverpool (New South Wales)
  - Electoral district of Liverpool
- Liverpool Plains, an agricultural area of New South Wales
- Liverpool Plains Shire, a local government area of New South Wales
- Liverpool River

=== Canada ===
- Liverpool, Nova Scotia

=== United Kingdom ===
- Liverpool (European Parliament constituency)
- Liverpool (UK Parliament constituency), former constituency

=== United States ===
- Liverpool, Illinois, a village
- Liverpool, Lake County, Indiana
- Liverpool, New York
- Liverpool, Pennsylvania
- Liverpool, Texas, a small city
- East Liverpool, Ohio

== Sports ==
- A.F.C. Liverpool, a semi-professional football club based in Liverpool, England
- City of Liverpool F.C., a football club based in Liverpool, England, in the Northern Premier League
- Liverpool City (1906), a defunct rugby league team based in Liverpool that played from 1906 to 1907
- Liverpool Football Club, the name of the Liverpool-based rugby union club until it merged with another club to form Liverpool St Helens F.C.
- Liverpool F.C., a Premier League football club based in Liverpool, England
- Liverpool F.C. Women, a Women's Super League football club based in Liverpool, England
- Liverpool F.C. (Montevideo), a football club based in Montevideo, Uruguay
- Liverpool Stanley, defunct rugby league team playing from 1951 to 1968
- Liverpool, a type of horse jumping obstacle
- South Liverpool F.C., a football club based in Liverpool, England

== Arts and entertainment ==
- Liverpool (2008 film), an Argentine film set in Tierra del Fuego
- Liverpool (2012 film), a Canadian film set in Montreal
- Liverpool (album), a 1986 album by Frankie Goes To Hollywood
- Liverpool, a Brazilian band later renamed as Bixo da Seda
- "Liverpool (We're Never Gonna...)", a 1983 song by Liverpool F.C.
- Liverpool (video game), a game based on the Liverpool F.C. team

== Other uses ==
- Liverpool (department store), a chain of department stores in Mexico, owned by the El Puerto de Liverpool group
- Liverpool rummy, a card game
- Liverpool-class lifeboat operated by the Royal National Lifeboat Institution (RNLI) 1931-1974
- Liverpool (privateer), an 18th-century British privateer
- Earl of Liverpool, a title in the British Peerage
- HMS Liverpool, seven ships of the Royal Navy
- El Puerto de Liverpool, a Mexican retail and commercial real estate group with origins in and which owns the Liverpool department stores
- University of Liverpool

== See also ==
- Livermore (disambiguation)
