= Edward St. Loe Livermore =

American politician

Member of the U.S. House of Representatives from Massachusetts's 3rd district
- In office March 4, 1807 – March 3, 1811
- Preceded by: Jeremiah Nelson
- Succeeded by: Leonard White

Personal details
- Born: April 5, 1762 Portsmouth, Province of New Hampshire, British America
- Died: September 15, 1832 (aged 70) Tewksbury, Massachusetts, U.S.
- Resting place: Granary Burying Ground
- Party: Federalist
- Profession: Law

Edward St. Loe Livermore (April 5, 1762 – September 15, 1832), son of Samuel Livermore and brother of Arthur Livermore, was a United States representative from Massachusetts. He was born in Portsmouth in the Province of New Hampshire on April 5, 1762. Livermore pursued classical studies, studied law, was admitted to the bar and commenced practice in Concord, New Hampshire and later practised in Portsmouth.

Livermore served as United States district attorney 1794-1797. Livermore also served as State Solicitor for Rockingham County 1791-1793, Associate Justice of the New Hampshire Superior Court of Judicature 1797-1799, and a naval officer for the port of Portsmouth 1799-1802. He moved to Newburyport, Massachusetts in 1802 and was elected as a Federalist to the Tenth and Eleventh Congresses (March 4, 1807 – March 3, 1811).

Livermore was not a candidate for renomination in 1810. Livermore resumed the practice of law, moved to Boston in 1811, then to Zanesville, Ohio. Livermore returned to Boston, and then moved to Tewksbury where he lived in retirement until his death there on September 15, 1832. His interment was in the Granary Burying Ground in Boston.

He was elected a member of the American Antiquarian Society in 1815.

Livermore was the father of Samuel Livermore, the authority on civil law and of Harriet Livermore (1788–1868), a prominent Millerite preacher.

Legal offices
Preceded by John Samuel Sherburne	2nd United States Attorney for the District of New Hampshire; 1794-1797	Succeeded by Jeremiah Smith
Preceded by Jeremiah Smith	4th United States Attorney for the District of New Hampshire; 1801-1801	Succeeded by John Samuel Sherburne
U.S. House of Representatives
Preceded by Jeremiah Nelson	Member of the U.S. House of Representatives from Massachusetts's 3rd congressional district March 4, 1807 – March 3, 1811	Succeeded by Leonard White
