= Livermorium =

Livermorium, _{116}Lv
Livermorium
- Pronunciation: /ˌlɪvərˈmɔːriəm/ (LIV-ər-MOR-ee-əm)
- Mass number: [293]

Livermorium in the periodic table
Hydrogen																															Helium
Lithium	Beryllium																									Boron	Carbon	Nitrogen	Oxygen	Fluorine	Neon
Sodium	Magnesium																									Aluminium	Silicon	Phosphorus	Sulfur	Chlorine	Argon
Potassium	Calcium															Scandium	Titanium	Vanadium	Chromium	Manganese	Iron	Cobalt	Nickel	Copper	Zinc	Gallium	Germanium	Arsenic	Selenium	Bromine	Krypton
Rubidium	Strontium															Yttrium	Zirconium	Niobium	Molybdenum	Technetium	Ruthenium	Rhodium	Palladium	Silver	Cadmium	Indium	Tin	Antimony	Tellurium	Iodine	Xenon
Caesium	Barium	Lanthanum	Cerium	Praseodymium	Neodymium	Promethium	Samarium	Europium	Gadolinium	Terbium	Dysprosium	Holmium	Erbium	Thulium	Ytterbium	Lutetium	Hafnium	Tantalum	Tungsten	Rhenium	Osmium	Iridium	Platinum	Gold	Mercury (element)	Thallium	Lead	Bismuth	Polonium	Astatine	Radon
Francium	Radium	Actinium	Thorium	Protactinium	Uranium	Neptunium	Plutonium	Americium	Curium	Berkelium	Californium	Einsteinium	Fermium	Mendelevium	Nobelium	Lawrencium	Rutherfordium	Dubnium	Seaborgium	Bohrium	Hassium	Meitnerium	Darmstadtium	Roentgenium	Copernicium	Nihonium	Flerovium	Moscovium	Livermorium	Tennessine	Oganesson
Po
↑
Lv
↓
—
moscovium ← livermorium → tennessine
- Atomic number (Z): 116
- Group: group 16 (chalcogens)
- Period: period 7
- Block: p-block
- Electron configuration: [Rn] 5f^{14} 6d^{10} 7s^{2} 7p^{4} (predicted)
- Electrons per shell: 2, 8, 18, 32, 32, 18, 6 (predicted)

Physical properties
- Phase at STP: solid (predicted)
- Melting point: 637–780 K (364–507 °C, 687–944 °F) (extrapolated)
- Boiling point: 1035–1135 K (762–862 °C, 1403–1583 °F) (extrapolated)
- Density (near r.t.): 12.9 g/cm^{3} (predicted)
- Heat of fusion: 7.61 kJ/mol (extrapolated)
- Heat of vaporization: 42 kJ/mol (predicted)

Atomic properties
- Oxidation states: common: (none) (−2), (+2), (+4)
- Ionization energies: 1st: 663.9 kJ/mol (predicted); 2nd: 1330 kJ/mol (predicted); 3rd: 2850 kJ/mol (predicted); (more)
- Atomic radius: empirical: 183 pm (predicted)
- Covalent radius: 162–166 pm (extrapolated)

Other properties
- Natural occurrence: synthetic
- CAS Number: 54100-71-9

History
- Naming: after Lawrence Livermore National Laboratory, itself named partly after Livermore, California
- Discovery: Joint Institute for Nuclear Research and Lawrence Livermore National Laboratory (2000)

Isotopes of livermorium
Main isotopes			Decay	
Isotope	abundance	half-life (t_{1/2})	mode	product
^{290}Lv	synth	8.3 ms	α	^{286}Fl
^{290}Lv	synth	8.3 ms	SF	–
^{291}Lv	synth	19 ms	α	^{287}Fl
^{292}Lv	synth	16 ms	α	^{288}Fl
^{293}Lv	synth	57 ms	α	^{289}Fl
^{293m}Lv	synth	20 ms	α	^{289}Fl

Livermorium is a synthetic chemical element; it has symbol Lv and atomic number 116. It is an extremely radioactive element that has only been created in laboratories and has not been observed in nature; about 35 livermorium atoms had been made as of 2020. The element is named after the Lawrence Livermore National Laboratory in the United States, which collaborated with the Joint Institute for Nuclear Research (JINR) in Dubna, Russia, to discover livermorium during experiments conducted between 2000 and 2006. The name of the laboratory refers to the city of Livermore, California, where it is located, which in turn was named after the rancher and landowner Robert Livermore. IUPAC officially added it to the periodic table on June 1, 2011, and adopted the name on May 30, 2012. Six isotopes of livermorium are known, with mass numbers 288–293 inclusive; the longest-lived is livermorium-293 with a half-life of about 80 milliseconds. A seventh possible isotope with mass number 294 has been reported but not yet confirmed.

In the periodic table, it is a p-block transactinide element. It is a member of the 7th period and is placed in group 16 as the heaviest chalcogen, but it has not been confirmed to behave as the heavier homologue to the chalcogen polonium. Livermorium is calculated to have some similar properties to its lighter homologues (oxygen, sulfur, selenium, tellurium, and polonium), and be a post-transition metal, though it should also show several major differences from them.

== Introduction ==
=== Synthesis of superheavy nuclei ===
A graphic depiction of a nuclear fusion reaction. Two nuclei fuse into one, emitting a neutron. Reactions that created new elements to this moment were similar, though varying numbers of neutrons – or alternatively charged particles – may be emitted instead.

A superheavy (Note: In nuclear physics, an element is called heavy if its atomic number is high; lead (element 82) is one example of such a heavy element. The term "superheavy elements" typically refers to elements with atomic number greater than 103 (although there are other definitions, such as atomic number greater than 100 or 112; sometimes, the term is presented an equivalent to the term "transactinide", which puts an upper limit before the beginning of the hypothetical superactinide series). Terms "heavy isotopes" (of a given element) and "heavy nuclei" mean what could be understood in the common language—isotopes of high mass (for the given element) and nuclei of high mass, respectively.) atomic nucleus is created in a nuclear reaction that combines two other nuclei of unequal size (Note: In 2009, a team at the JINR led by Oganessian published results of their attempt to create hassium in a symmetric ^{136}Xe + ^{136}Xe reaction. They failed to observe a single atom in such a reaction, putting the upper limit on the cross section, the measure of probability of a nuclear reaction, as 2.5 pb. In comparison, the reaction that resulted in hassium discovery, ^{208}Pb + ^{58}Fe, had a cross section of ~20 pb (more specifically, 19^{+19}_{-11} pb), as estimated by the discoverers.) into one; roughly, the more unequal the two nuclei in terms of mass, the greater the possibility that the two react. The material made of the heavier nuclei is made into a target, which is then bombarded by the beam of lighter nuclei. Two nuclei can only fuse into one if they are close enough to each other; normally, nuclei (all positively charged) repel each other due to electrostatic repulsion. The strong interaction can overcome this repulsion but only within a very short distance from a nucleus; beam nuclei are thus greatly accelerated in order to make such repulsion insignificant compared to the velocity of the beam nucleus. The energy applied to the beam nuclei to accelerate them can cause them to reach speeds as high as one-tenth of the speed of light. However, if too much energy is applied, the beam nucleus can fall apart.

Coming close enough alone is not enough for two nuclei to fuse: when two nuclei approach each other, they usually remain together for about 10^{−20} seconds and then part ways (not necessarily in the same composition as before the reaction) rather than form a single nucleus. This happens because during the attempted formation of a single nucleus, electrostatic repulsion tears apart the nucleus that is being formed. Each pair of a target and a beam is characterized by its cross section—the probability that fusion will occur if two nuclei approach one another expressed in terms of the transverse area that the incident particle must hit in order for the fusion to occur. (Note: The amount of energy applied to the beam particle to accelerate it can also influence the value of cross section. For example, in the ^{28}_{14}Si + ^{1}_{0}n → ^{28}_{13}Al + ^{1}_{1}p reaction, cross section changes smoothly from 370 mb at 12.3 MeV to 160 mb at 18.3 MeV, with a broad peak at 13.5 MeV with the maximum value of 380 mb.) This fusion may occur as a result of the quantum effect in which nuclei can tunnel through electrostatic repulsion. If the two nuclei can stay close past that phase, multiple nuclear interactions result in redistribution of energy and an energy equilibrium.

External videos
- Visualization of unsuccessful nuclear fusion, based on calculations from the Australian National University

The resulting merger is an excited state—termed a compound nucleus—and thus it is very unstable. To reach a more stable state, the temporary merger may fission without formation of a more stable nucleus. Alternatively, the compound nucleus may eject a few neutrons, which would carry away the excitation energy; if the latter is not sufficient for a neutron expulsion, the merger would produce a gamma ray. This happens in about 10^{−16} seconds after the initial nuclear collision and results in creation of a more stable nucleus. The definition by the IUPAC/IUPAP Joint Working Party (JWP) states that a chemical element can only be recognized as discovered if a nucleus of it exists for at least 10^{−14} seconds. This value was chosen as an estimate of how long it takes a nucleus to acquire electrons and thus display its chemical properties. (Note: This figure also marks the generally accepted upper limit for lifetime of a compound nucleus.)

=== Decay and detection ===
The beam passes through the target and reaches the next chamber, the separator; if a new nucleus is produced, it is carried with this beam. In the separator, the newly produced nucleus is separated from other nuclides (that of the original beam and any other reaction products) (Note: This separation is based on that the resulting nuclei move past the target more slowly then the unreacted beam nuclei. The separator contains electric and magnetic fields whose effects on a moving particle cancel out for a specific velocity of a particle. Such separation can also be aided by a time-of-flight measurement and a recoil energy measurement; a combination of the two may allow to estimate the mass of a nucleus.) and transferred to a surface-barrier detector, which stops the nucleus. The exact location of the upcoming impact on the detector is marked; also marked are its energy and the time of the arrival. The transfer takes about 10^{−6} seconds; in order to be detected, the nucleus must survive this long. The nucleus is recorded again once its decay is registered, and the location, the energy, and the time of the decay are measured.

Stability of a nucleus is provided by the strong interaction. However, its range is very short; as nuclei become larger, its influence on the outermost nucleons (protons and neutrons) weakens. At the same time, the nucleus is torn apart by electrostatic repulsion between protons, and its range is not limited. Total binding energy provided by the strong interaction increases linearly with the number of nucleons, whereas electrostatic repulsion increases with the square of the atomic number, i.e. the latter grows faster and becomes increasingly important for heavy and superheavy nuclei. Superheavy nuclei are thus theoretically predicted and have so far been observed to predominantly decay via decay modes that are caused by such repulsion: alpha decay and spontaneous fission. (Note: Not all decay modes are caused by electrostatic repulsion. For example, beta decay is caused by the weak interaction.) Almost all alpha emitters have over 210 nucleons, and the lightest nuclide primarily undergoing spontaneous fission has 238. In both decay modes, nuclei are inhibited from decaying by corresponding energy barriers for each mode, but they can be tunneled through.

Scheme of an apparatus for creation of superheavy elements, based on the Dubna Gas-Filled Recoil Separator set up in the Flerov Laboratory of Nuclear Reactions in JINR. The trajectory within the detector and the beam focusing apparatus changes because of a dipole magnet in the former and quadrupole magnets in the latter.

Alpha particles are commonly produced in radioactive decays because the mass of an alpha particle per nucleon is small enough to leave some energy for the alpha particle to be used as kinetic energy to leave the nucleus. Spontaneous fission is caused by electrostatic repulsion tearing the nucleus apart and produces various nuclei in different instances of identical nuclei fissioning. As the atomic number increases, spontaneous fission rapidly becomes more important: spontaneous fission partial half-lives decrease by 23 orders of magnitude from uranium (element 92) to nobelium (element 102), and by 30 orders of magnitude from thorium (element 90) to fermium (element 100). The earlier liquid drop model thus suggested that spontaneous fission would occur nearly instantly due to disappearance of the fission barrier for nuclei with about 280 nucleons. The later nuclear shell model suggested that nuclei with about 300 nucleons would form an island of stability in which nuclei will be more resistant to spontaneous fission and will primarily undergo alpha decay with longer half-lives. Subsequent discoveries suggested that the predicted island might be further than originally anticipated; they also showed that nuclei intermediate between the long-lived actinides and the predicted island are deformed, and gain additional stability from shell effects. Experiments on lighter superheavy nuclei, as well as those closer to the expected island, have shown greater than previously anticipated stability against spontaneous fission, showing the importance of shell effects on nuclei. (Note: It was already known by the 1960s that ground states of nuclei differed in energy and shape as well as that certain magic numbers of nucleons corresponded to greater stability of a nucleus. However, it was assumed that there was no nuclear structure in superheavy nuclei as they were too deformed to form one.)

Alpha decays are registered by the emitted alpha particles, and the decay products are easy to determine before the actual decay; if such a decay or a series of consecutive decays produces a known nucleus, the original product of a reaction can be easily determined. (Note: Since mass of a nucleus is not measured directly but is rather calculated from that of another nucleus, such measurement is called indirect. Direct measurements are also possible, but for the most part they have remained unavailable for superheavy nuclei. The first direct measurement of mass of a superheavy nucleus was reported in 2018 at LBNL. Mass was determined from the location of a nucleus after the transfer (the location helps determine its trajectory, which is linked to the mass-to-charge ratio of the nucleus, since the transfer was done in presence of a magnet).) (That all decays within a decay chain were indeed related to each other is established by the location of these decays, which must be in the same place.) The known nucleus can be recognized by the specific characteristics of decay it undergoes such as decay energy (or more specifically, the kinetic energy of the emitted particle). (Note: If the decay occurred in a vacuum, then since total momentum of an isolated system before and after the decay must be preserved, the daughter nucleus would also receive a small velocity. The ratio of the two velocities, and accordingly the ratio of the kinetic energies, would thus be inverse to the ratio of the two masses. The decay energy equals the sum of the known kinetic energy of the alpha particle and that of the daughter nucleus (an exact fraction of the former). The calculations hold for an experiment as well, but the difference is that the nucleus does not move after the decay because it is tied to the detector.) Spontaneous fission, however, produces various nuclei as products, so the original nuclide cannot be determined from its daughters. (Note: Spontaneous fission was discovered by Soviet physicist Georgy Flerov, a leading scientist at JINR, and thus it was a "hobbyhorse" for the facility. In contrast, the LBL scientists believed fission information was not sufficient for a claim of synthesis of an element. They believed spontaneous fission had not been studied enough to use it for identification of a new element, since there was a difficulty of establishing that a compound nucleus had only ejected neutrons and not charged particles like protons or alpha particles. They thus preferred to link new isotopes to the already known ones by successive alpha decays.)

The information available to physicists aiming to synthesize a superheavy element is thus the information collected at the detectors: location, energy, and time of arrival of a particle to the detector, and those of its decay. The physicists analyze this data and seek to conclude that it was indeed caused by a new element and could not have been caused by a different nuclide than the one claimed. Often, provided data is insufficient for a conclusion that a new element was definitely created and there is no other explanation for the observed effects; errors in interpreting data have been made. (Note: For instance, element 102 was mistakenly identified in 1957 at the Nobel Institute of Physics in Stockholm, Stockholm County, Sweden. There were no earlier definitive claims of creation of this element, and the element was assigned a name by its Swedish, American, and British discoverers, nobelium. It was later shown that the identification was incorrect. The following year, RL was unable to reproduce the Swedish results and announced instead their synthesis of the element; that claim was also disproved later. JINR insisted that they were the first to create the element and suggested a name of their own for the new element, joliotium; the Soviet name was also not accepted (JINR later referred to the naming of the element 102 as "hasty"). This name was proposed to IUPAC in a written response to their ruling on priority of discovery claims of elements, signed 29 September 1992. The name "nobelium" remained unchanged on account of its widespread usage.)

== History ==
=== Unsuccessful synthesis attempts ===
The first search for element 116, using the reaction between ^{248}Cm and ^{48}Ca, was performed in 1977 by Ken Hulet and his team at the Lawrence Livermore National Laboratory (LLNL). They were unable to detect any atoms of livermorium. Yuri Oganessian and his team at the Flerov Laboratory of Nuclear Reactions (FLNR) in the Joint Institute for Nuclear Research (JINR) subsequently attempted the reaction in 1978 and met failure. In 1985, in a joint experiment between Berkeley and Peter Armbruster's team at GSI, the result was again negative, with a calculated cross section limit of 10–100 pb. Work on reactions with ^{48}Ca, which had proved very useful in the synthesis of nobelium from the ^{nat}Pb+^{48}Ca reaction, nevertheless continued at Dubna, with a superheavy element separator being developed in 1989, a search for target materials and starting of collaborations with LLNL beginning in 1990, production of more intense ^{48}Ca beams beginning in 1996, and preparations for long-term experiments with 3 orders of magnitude higher sensitivity being performed in the early 1990s. This work led directly to the production of new isotopes of elements 112 to 118 in the reactions of ^{48}Ca with actinide targets and the discovery of the 5 heaviest elements on the periodic table: flerovium, moscovium, livermorium, tennessine, and oganesson.

In 1995, an international team led by Sigurd Hofmann at the Gesellschaft für Schwerionenforschung (GSI) in Darmstadt, Germany attempted to synthesise element 116 in a radiative capture reaction (in which the compound nucleus de-excites through pure gamma emission without evaporating neutrons) between a lead-208 target and selenium-82 projectiles. No atoms of element 116 were identified.

=== Unconfirmed discovery claims ===
In late 1998, Polish physicist Robert Smolańczuk published calculations on the fusion of atomic nuclei towards the synthesis of superheavy atoms, including elements 118 and 116. His calculations suggested that it might be possible to make these two elements by fusing lead with krypton under carefully controlled conditions.

In 1999, researchers at Lawrence Berkeley National Laboratory made use of these predictions and announced the discovery of elements 118 and 116, in a paper published in Physical Review Letters, and very soon after the results were reported in Science. The researchers reported to have performed the reaction

^{86}_{36}Kr + ^{208}_{82}Pb → ^{293}_{118}Og + n → ^{289}_{116}Lv + α

The following year, they published a retraction after researchers at other laboratories were unable to duplicate the results and the Berkeley lab itself was unable to duplicate them as well. In June 2002, the director of the lab announced that the original claim of the discovery of these two elements had been based on data fabricated by principal author Victor Ninov. The isotope ^{289}Lv was finally discovered in 2024 at the JINR.

=== Discovery ===
Livermorium was first synthesized on July 19, 2000, when scientists at Dubna (JINR) bombarded a curium-248 target with accelerated calcium-48 ions. A single atom was detected, decaying by alpha emission with decay energy 10.54 MeV to an isotope of flerovium. The results were published in December 2000.

^{248}_{96}Cm + ^{48}_{20}Ca → ^{296}_{116}Lv* → ^{293}_{116}Lv + 3 ^{1}_{0}n → ^{289}_{114}Fl + α

The daughter flerovium isotope had properties matching those of a flerovium isotope first synthesized in June 1999, which was originally assigned to ^{288}Fl, implying an assignment of the parent livermorium isotope to ^{292}Lv. Later work in December 2002 indicated that the synthesized flerovium isotope was actually ^{289}Fl, and hence the assignment of the synthesized livermorium atom was correspondingly altered to ^{293}Lv.

=== Road to confirmation ===
Two further atoms were reported by the institute during their second experiment during April–May 2001. In the same experiment they also detected a decay chain which corresponded to the first observed decay of flerovium in December 1998, which had been assigned to ^{289}Fl. No flerovium isotope with the same properties as the one found in December 1998 has ever been observed again, even in repeats of the same reaction. Later it was found that ^{289}Fl has different decay properties and that the first observed flerovium atom may have been its nuclear isomer ^{289m}Fl. The observation of ^{289m}Fl in this series of experiments may indicate the formation of a parent isomer of livermorium, namely ^{293m}Lv, or a rare and previously unobserved decay branch of the already-discovered state ^{293}Lv to ^{289m}Fl. Neither possibility is certain, and research is required to positively assign this activity. Another possibility suggested is the assignment of the original December 1998 atom to ^{290}Fl, as the low beam energy used in that original experiment makes the 2n channel plausible; its parent could then conceivably be ^{294}Lv, but this assignment would still need confirmation in the ^{248}Cm(^{48}Ca,2n)^{294}Lv reaction.

The team repeated the experiment in April–May 2005 and detected 8 atoms of livermorium. The measured decay data confirmed the assignment of the first-discovered isotope as ^{293}Lv. In this run, the team also observed the isotope ^{292}Lv for the first time. In further experiments from 2004 to 2006, the team replaced the curium-248 target with the lighter curium isotope curium-245. Here evidence was found for the two isotopes ^{290}Lv and ^{291}Lv.

In May 2009, the IUPAC/IUPAP Joint Working Party reported on the discovery of copernicium and acknowledged the discovery of the isotope ^{283}Cn. This implied the de facto discovery of the isotope ^{291}Lv, from the acknowledgment of the data relating to its granddaughter ^{283}Cn, although the livermorium data was not absolutely critical for the demonstration of copernicium's discovery. Also in 2009, confirmation from Berkeley and the Gesellschaft für Schwerionenforschung (GSI) in Germany came for the flerovium isotopes 286 to 289, immediate daughters of the four known livermorium isotopes. In 2011, IUPAC evaluated the Dubna team experiments of 2000–2006. Whereas they found the earliest data (not involving ^{291}Lv and ^{283}Cn) inconclusive, the results of 2004–2006 were accepted as identification of livermorium, and the element was officially recognized as having been discovered.

The synthesis of livermorium has been separately confirmed at the GSI (2012) and RIKEN (2014 and 2016). In the 2012 GSI experiment, one chain tentatively assigned to ^{293}Lv was shown to be inconsistent with previous data; it is believed that this chain may instead originate from an isomeric state, ^{293m}Lv. In the 2016 RIKEN experiment, one atom that may be assigned to ^{294}Lv was seemingly detected, alpha decaying to ^{290}Fl and ^{286}Cn, which underwent spontaneous fission; however, the first alpha from the livermorium nuclide produced was missed, and the assignment to ^{294}Lv is still uncertain though plausible.

=== Naming ===
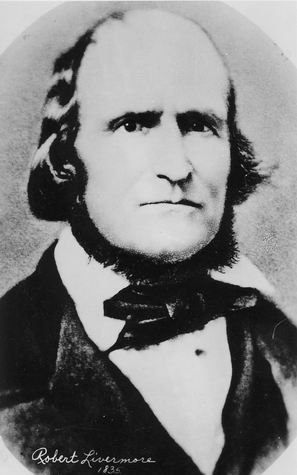
Robert Livermore, the indirect namesake of livermorium

Using Mendeleev's nomenclature for unnamed and undiscovered elements, livermorium is sometimes called eka-polonium. In 1979 IUPAC recommended that the placeholder systematic element name ununhexium (Uuh) be used until the discovery of the element was confirmed and a name was decided. Although widely used in the chemical community on all levels, from chemistry classrooms to advanced textbooks, the recommendations were mostly ignored among scientists in the field, who called it "element 116", with the symbol of E116, (116), or even simply 116.

According to IUPAC recommendations, the discoverer or discoverers of a new element have the right to suggest a name. The discovery of livermorium was recognized by the Joint Working Party (JWP) of IUPAC on 1 June 2011, along with that of flerovium. According to the vice-director of JINR, the Dubna team originally wanted to name element 116 moscovium, after the Moscow Oblast in which Dubna is located, but it was later decided to use this name for element 115 instead. The name livermorium and the symbol Lv were adopted on May 23, 2012. The name recognises the Lawrence Livermore National Laboratory, within the city of Livermore, California, US, which collaborated with JINR on the discovery. The city in turn is named after the American rancher Robert Livermore, a naturalized Mexican citizen of English birth. The naming ceremony for flerovium and livermorium was held in Moscow on October 24, 2012.

=== Other routes of synthesis ===
The synthesis of livermorium in fusion reactions using projectiles heavier than ^{48}Ca has been explored in preparation for synthesis attempts of the yet-undiscovered element 120, as such reactions would necessarily utilize heavier projectiles. In 2023, the reaction between ^{238}U and ^{54}Cr was studied at the JINR's Superheavy Element Factory in Dubna; one atom of the new isotope ^{288}Lv was reported. More detailed analysis of this reaction was published in 2025, by which time another atom had been reported. Similarly, in 2024, a team at the Lawrence Berkeley National Laboratory reported the synthesis of two atoms of ^{290}Lv in the reaction between ^{244}Pu and ^{50}Ti. This result was described as "truly groundbreaking" by RIKEN director Hiromitsu Haba, whose team plans to search for element 119. The team at JINR studied the reaction between ^{242}Pu and ^{50}Ti in 2024 as a follow-up to the ^{238}U+^{54}Cr, obtaining additional decay data for ^{288}Lv and its decay products (two new chains) and discovering the new isotope ^{289}Lv (three chains).

== Predicted properties ==
Other than nuclear properties, no properties of livermorium or its compounds have been measured; this is due to its extremely limited and expensive production and the fact that it decays very quickly. Properties of livermorium remain unknown and only predictions are available.

=== Nuclear stability and isotopes ===
The expected location of the island of stability is marked by the white circle. The dotted line is the line of beta stability.

Livermorium is expected to be near an island of stability centered on copernicium (element 112) and flerovium (element 114). Due to the expected high fission barriers, any nucleus within this island of stability exclusively decays by alpha decay and perhaps some electron capture and beta decay. While the known isotopes of livermorium do not actually have enough neutrons to be on the island of stability, they can be seen to approach the island, as the heavier isotopes are generally the longer-lived ones.

Superheavy elements are produced by nuclear fusion. These fusion reactions can be divided into "hot" and "cold" fusion, (Note: Despite the name, "cold fusion" in the context of superheavy element synthesis is a distinct concept from the idea that nuclear fusion can be achieved in room temperature conditions (see cold fusion).) depending on the excitation energy of the compound nucleus produced. In hot fusion reactions, very light, high-energy projectiles are accelerated toward very heavy targets (actinides), giving rise to compound nuclei at high excitation energy (~40–50 MeV) that may either fission or evaporate several (3 to 5) neutrons. In cold fusion reactions (which use heavier projectiles, typically from the fourth period, and lighter targets, usually lead and bismuth), the produced fused nuclei have a relatively low excitation energy (~10–20 MeV), which decreases the probability that these products will undergo fission reactions. As the fused nuclei cool to the ground state, they require emission of only one or two neutrons. Hot fusion reactions tend to produce more neutron-rich products because the actinides have the highest neutron-to-proton ratios of any elements that can presently be made in macroscopic quantities.

Important information could be gained regarding the properties of superheavy nuclei by the synthesis of more livermorium isotopes, specifically those with a few neutrons more or less than the known ones – ^{286}Lv, ^{287}Lv, ^{294}Lv, and ^{295}Lv. This is possible because there are many reasonably long-lived isotopes of curium that can be used to make a target. The light isotopes can be made by fusing curium-243 with calcium-48. They would undergo a chain of alpha decays, ending at transactinide isotopes that are too light to achieve by hot fusion and too heavy to be produced by cold fusion. The same neutron-deficient isotopes are also reachable in reactions with projectiles heavier than ^{48}Ca, which will be necessary to reach elements beyond atomic number 118 (or possibly 119); this is how ^{288}Lv and ^{289}Lv were discovered.

The synthesis of the heavy isotopes ^{294}Lv and ^{295}Lv could be accomplished by fusing the heavy curium isotope curium-250 with calcium-48. The cross section of this nuclear reaction would be about 1 picobarn, though it is not yet possible to produce ^{250}Cm in the quantities needed for target manufacture. Alternatively, ^{294}Lv could be produced via charged-particle evaporation in the ^{251}Cf(^{48}Ca,pn) reaction. After a few alpha decays, these livermorium isotopes would reach nuclides at the line of beta stability. Additionally, electron capture may also become an important decay mode in this region, allowing affected nuclei to reach the middle of the island. For example, it is predicted that ^{295}Lv would alpha decay to ^{291}Fl, which would undergo successive electron capture to ^{291}Nh and then ^{291}Cn which is expected to be in the middle of the island of stability and have a half-life of about 1200 years, affording the most likely hope of reaching the middle of the island using current technology. A drawback is that the decay properties of superheavy nuclei this close to the line of beta stability are largely unexplored.

Other possibilities to synthesize nuclei on the island of stability include quasifission (partial fusion followed by fission) of a massive nucleus. Such nuclei tend to fission, expelling doubly magic or nearly doubly magic fragments such as calcium-40, tin-132, lead-208, or bismuth-209. Recently it has been shown that the multi-nucleon transfer reactions in collisions of actinide nuclei (such as uranium and curium) might be used to synthesize the neutron-rich superheavy nuclei located at the island of stability, although formation of the lighter elements nobelium or seaborgium is more favored. One last possibility to synthesize isotopes near the island is to use controlled nuclear explosions to create a neutron flux high enough to bypass the gaps of instability at ^{258–260}Fm and at mass number 275 (atomic numbers 104 to 108), mimicking the r-process in which the actinides were first produced in nature and the gap of instability around radon bypassed. Some such isotopes (especially ^{291}Cn and ^{293}Cn) may even have been synthesized in nature, but would have decayed away far too quickly (with half-lives of only thousands of years) and be produced in far too small quantities (about 10^{−12} the abundance of lead) to be detectable as primordial nuclides today outside cosmic rays.

=== Physical and atomic ===
In the periodic table, livermorium is a member of group 16, the chalcogens. It appears below oxygen, sulfur, selenium, tellurium, and polonium. Every previous chalcogen has six electrons in its valence shell, forming a valence electron configuration of ns^{2}np^{4}. In livermorium's case, the trend should be continued and the valence electron configuration is predicted to be 7s^{2}7p^{4}; therefore, livermorium will have some similarities to its lighter congeners. Differences are likely to arise; a large contributing effect is the spin–orbit (SO) interaction—the mutual interaction between the electrons' motion and spin. It is especially strong for the superheavy elements, because their electrons move much faster than in lighter atoms, at velocities comparable to the speed of light. In relation to livermorium atoms, it lowers the 7s and the 7p electron energy levels (stabilizing the corresponding electrons), but two of the 7p electron energy levels are stabilized more than the other four. The stabilization of the 7s electrons is called the inert pair effect, and the effect "tearing" the 7p subshell into the more stabilized and the less stabilized parts is called subshell splitting. Computation chemists see the split as a change of the second (azimuthal) quantum number l from 1 to 1/2 and 3/2 for the more stabilized and less stabilized parts of the 7p subshell, respectively: the 7p_{1/2} subshell acts as a second inert pair, though not as inert as the 7s electrons, while the 7p_{3/2} subshell can easily participate in chemistry. (Note: The quantum number corresponds to the letter in the electron orbital name: 0 to s, 1 to p, 2 to d, etc. See azimuthal quantum number for more information.) For many theoretical purposes, the valence electron configuration may be represented to reflect the 7p subshell split as 7s^{2}7p^{2}_{1/2}7p^{2}_{3/2}.

Inert pair effects in livermorium should be even stronger than in polonium and hence the +2 oxidation state becomes more stable than the +4 state, which would be stabilized only by the most electronegative ligands; this is reflected in the expected ionization energies of livermorium, where there are large gaps between the second and third ionization energies (corresponding to the breaching of the unreactive 7p_{1/2} shell) and fourth and fifth ionization energies. Indeed, the 7s electrons are expected to be so inert that the +6 state will not be attainable. The melting and boiling points of livermorium are expected to continue the trends down the chalcogens; thus livermorium should melt at a higher temperature than polonium, but boil at a lower temperature. It should also be denser than polonium (α-Lv: 12.9 g/cm^{3}; α-Po: 9.2 g/cm^{3}); like polonium it should also form an α and a β allotrope. The electron of a hydrogen-like livermorium atom (oxidized so that it only has one electron, Lv^{115+}) is expected to move so fast that it has a mass 1.86 times that of a stationary electron, due to relativistic effects. For comparison, the figures for hydrogen-like polonium and tellurium are expected to be 1.26 and 1.080 respectively.

=== Chemical ===
Livermorium is projected to be the fourth member of the 7p series of chemical elements and the heaviest member of group 16 in the periodic table, below polonium. While it is the least theoretically studied of the 7p elements, its chemistry is expected to be quite similar to that of polonium. The group oxidation state of +6 is known for all the chalcogens apart from oxygen which cannot expand its octet and is one of the strongest oxidizing agents among the chemical elements. Oxygen is thus limited to a maximum +2 state, exhibited in the fluoride OF_{2}. The +4 state is known for sulfur, selenium, tellurium, and polonium, undergoing a shift in stability from reducing for sulfur(IV) and selenium(IV) through being the most stable state for tellurium(IV) to being oxidizing in polonium(IV). This suggests a decreasing stability for the higher oxidation states as the group is descended due to the increasing importance of relativistic effects, especially the inert pair effect. The most stable oxidation state of livermorium should thus be +2, with a rather unstable +4 state. The +2 state should be about as easy to form as it is for beryllium and magnesium, and the +4 state should only be achieved with strongly electronegative ligands, such as in livermorium(IV) fluoride (LvF_{4}). The +6 state should not exist at all due to the very strong stabilization of the 7s electrons, making the valence core of livermorium only four electrons. The lighter chalcogens are also known to form a −2 state as oxide, sulfide, selenide, telluride, and polonide; due to the destabilization of livermorium's 7p_{3/2} subshell, the −2 state should be very unstable for livermorium, whose chemistry should be essentially purely cationic, though the larger subshell and spinor energy splittings of livermorium as compared to polonium should make Lv^{2−} slightly less unstable than expected.

Livermorium hydride (LvH_{2}) would be the heaviest chalcogen hydride and the heaviest homologue of water (the lighter ones are H_{2}S, H_{2}Se, H_{2}Te, and PoH_{2}). Polane (polonium hydride) is a more covalent compound than most metal hydrides because polonium straddles the border between metal and metalloid and has some nonmetallic properties: it is intermediate between a hydrogen halide like hydrogen chloride (HCl) and a metal hydride like stannane (SnH_{4}). Livermorane should continue this trend: it should be a hydride rather than a livermoride, but still a covalent molecular compound. Spin-orbit interactions are expected to make the Lv–H bond longer than expected from periodic trends alone, and make the H–Lv–H bond angle larger than expected: this is theorized to be because the unoccupied 8s orbitals are relatively low in energy and can hybridize with the valence 7p orbitals of livermorium. This phenomenon, dubbed "supervalent hybridization", has some analogues in non-relativistic regions in the periodic table; for example, molecular calcium difluoride has 4s and 3d involvement from the calcium atom. The heavier livermorium dihalides are predicted to be linear, but the lighter ones are predicted to be bent.

== Experimental chemistry ==
Unambiguous determination of the chemical characteristics of livermorium has not yet been established. In 2011, experiments were conducted to create nihonium, flerovium, and moscovium isotopes in the reactions between calcium-48 projectiles and targets of americium-243 and plutonium-244. The targets included lead and bismuth impurities and hence some isotopes of bismuth and polonium were generated in nucleon transfer reactions. This, while an unforeseen complication, could give information that would help in the future chemical investigation of the heavier homologs of bismuth and polonium, which are respectively moscovium and livermorium. The produced nuclides bismuth-213 and polonium-212m were transported as the hydrides ^{213}BiH_{3} and ^{212m}PoH_{2} at 850 °C through a quartz wool filter unit held with tantalum, showing that these hydrides were surprisingly thermally stable, although their heavier congeners McH_{3} and LvH_{2} would be expected to be less thermally stable from simple extrapolation of periodic trends in the p-block. Further calculations on the stability and electronic structure of BiH_{3}, McH_{3}, PoH_{2}, and LvH_{2} are needed before chemical investigations take place. Moscovium and livermorium are expected to be volatile enough as pure elements for them to be chemically investigated in the near future, a property livermorium would then share with its lighter congener polonium, though the short half-lives of all presently known livermorium isotopes means that the element is still inaccessible to experimental chemistry.

== Bibliography ==
- Audi, G.; Kondev, F. G.; Wang, M.; et al. (2017). "The NUBASE2016 evaluation of nuclear properties". Chinese Physics C. 41 (3) 030001. Bibcode:2017ChPhC..41c0001A. doi:10.1088/1674-1137/41/3/030001.
- Beiser, A. (2003). Concepts of modern physics (6th ed.). McGraw-Hill. ISBN 978-0-07-244848-1. OCLC 48965418.
- Hoffman, D. C.; Ghiorso, A.; Seaborg, G. T. (2000). The Transuranium People: The Inside Story. World Scientific. ISBN 978-1-78-326244-1.
- Kragh, H. (2018). From Transuranic to Superheavy Elements: A Story of Dispute and Creation. Springer. ISBN 978-3-319-75813-8.
