= Isotopes of flerovium =

Isotopes of flerovium (_{114}Fl)
Main isotopes			Decay	
Isotope	abundance	half-life (t_{1/2})	mode	product
^{284}Fl	synth	2.5 ms	SF	–
^{284}Fl	synth	2.5 ms	α	^{280}Cn
^{285}Fl	synth	100 ms	α	^{281}Cn
^{286}Fl	synth	105 ms	α55%	^{282}Cn
^{286}Fl	synth	105 ms	SF45%	–
^{287}Fl	synth	360 ms	α	^{283}Cn
^{287}Fl	synth	360 ms	ε?	^{287}Nh
^{288}Fl	synth	653 ms	α	^{284}Cn
^{289}Fl	synth	1.9 s	α	^{285}Cn
^{290}Fl	synth	19 s?	EC	^{290}Nh
^{290}Fl	synth	19 s?	α	^{286}Cn

Flerovium (_{114}Fl) is a synthetic element, and thus a standard atomic weight cannot be given. Like all synthetic elements, it has no stable isotopes. The first isotope to be synthesized was ^{289}Fl in 1999 (or possibly 1998). Flerovium has six known isotopes, along with the unconfirmed ^{290}Fl, and possibly two nuclear isomers. The longest-lived isotope is ^{289}Fl with a half-life of 1.9 seconds, but ^{290}Fl may have a longer half-life of 19 seconds.

== List of isotopes ==
Nuclide	Z	N	Isotopic mass (Da) (Note: ( ) – Uncertainty (1σ) is given in concise form in parentheses after the corresponding last digits.) (Note: # – Atomic mass marked #: value and uncertainty derived not from purely experimental data, but at least partly from trends from the Mass Surface (TMS).)	Discovery year	Half-life	Decay mode (Note: Modes of decay: EC: / Electron capture; SF: / Spontaneous fission)	Daughter isotope	Spin and parity (Note: # – Values marked # are not purely derived from experimental data, but at least partly from trends of neighboring nuclides (TNN).)
^{284}Fl	114	170	284.18119(70)#	2015	2.5+1.2 −0.6 ms	SF (76%)	(various)	0+
^{284}Fl	114	170	284.18119(70)#	2015	2.5+1.2 −0.6 ms	α (24%)	^{280}Cn	0+
^{285}Fl	114	171	285.18350(43)#	2010	86+43 −21 ms	α	^{281}Cn	3/2+#
^{286}Fl	114	172	286.18423(59)#	2004	105+17 −13 ms	α (55%)	^{282}Cn	0+
^{286}Fl	114	172	286.18423(59)#	2004	105+17 −13 ms	SF (45%)	(various)	0+
^{287}Fl	114	173	287.18672(66)#	2004	360+45 −36 ms	α	^{283}Cn	
^{287}Fl	114	173	287.18672(66)#	2004	360+45 −36 ms	EC?	^{287}Nh	
^{288}Fl	114	174	288.18778(82)#	2004	653(113) ms	α	^{284}Cn	0+
^{289}Fl	114	175	289.19052(55)#	2004	1.9+0.7 −0.4 s [2.1(6) s]	α	^{285}Cn	5/2+#
^{289m}Fl (Note: Discovery of this isomer is unconfirmed)	750(280)# keV			2012	1.1±0.8 s	α	^{285m}Cn	
^{290}Fl (Note: Discovery of this isotope is unconfirmed)	114	176	290.19188(75)#	(2016)	19 s?	EC	^{290}Nh	0+
^{290}Fl	114	176	290.19188(75)#	(2016)	19 s?	α	^{286}Cn	0+
This table header & footer:

== Isotopes and nuclear properties ==
=== Nucleosynthesis ===
==== Target-projectile combinations leading to Z=114 compound nuclei ====
The below table contains various combinations of targets and projectiles which could be used to form compound nuclei with an atomic number of 114.

Target	Projectile	CN	Attempt result
^{208}Pb	^{76}Ge	^{284}Fl	Failure to date
^{238}U	^{50}Ti	^{288}Fl	Planned reaction
^{238}U	^{48}Ti	^{286}Fl	Reaction yet to be attempted
^{244}Pu	^{48}Ca	^{292}Fl	Successful reaction
^{242}Pu	^{48}Ca	^{290}Fl	Successful reaction
^{240}Pu	^{48}Ca	^{288}Fl	Successful reaction
^{239}Pu	^{48}Ca	^{287}Fl	Successful reaction
^{250}Cm	^{40}Ar	^{290}Fl	Reaction yet to be attempted
^{248}Cm	^{40}Ar	^{288}Fl	Failure to date

==== Cold fusion ====
This section deals with the synthesis of nuclei of flerovium by so-called "cold" fusion reactions. These are processes which create compound nuclei at low excitation energy (~10–20 MeV, hence "cold"), leading to a higher probability of survival from fission. The excited nucleus then decays to the ground state via the emission of one or two neutrons only.

===== ^{208}Pb(^{76}Ge,xn)^{284−x}Fl =====
The first attempt to synthesise flerovium in cold fusion reactions was performed at Grand accélérateur national d'ions lourds (GANIL), France in 2003. No atoms were detected, providing a yield limit of 1.2 pb. The team at RIKEN have indicated plans to study this reaction.

==== Hot fusion ====
This section deals with the synthesis of nuclei of flerovium by so-called "hot" fusion reactions. These are processes which create compound nuclei at high excitation energy (~40–50 MeV, hence "hot"), leading to a reduced probability of survival from fission. The excited nucleus then decays to the ground state via the emission of 3–5 neutrons. Fusion reactions utilizing ^{48}Ca nuclei usually produce compound nuclei with intermediate excitation energies (~30–35 MeV) and are sometimes referred to as "warm" fusion reactions. This leads, in part, to relatively high yields from these reactions.

===== ^{248}Cm(^{40}Ar,xn)^{288-x}Fl =====
One of the first attempts at synthesis of superheavy elements was performed by Albert Ghiorso et al. and Stan Thompson et al. in 1968 at the Lawrence Berkeley National Laboratory using this reaction. No events attributable to superheavy nuclei were identified; this was expected as the compound nucleus ^{288}Fl (with N = 174) falls ten neutrons short of the closed shell predicted at N = 184. This first unsuccessful synthesis attempt provided early indications of cross-section and half-life limits for superheavy nuclei producible in hot fusion reactions.

===== ^{244}Pu(^{48}Ca,xn)^{292−x}Fl (x=2?,3,4,5) =====
The first experiments on the synthesis of flerovium were performed by the team in Dubna in November 1998. They were able to detect a single, long decay chain, assigned to ^{289}Fl. The reaction was repeated in 1999 and a further two atoms of flerovium were detected. The products were assigned to ^{288}Fl. The team further studied the reaction in 2002. During the measurement of the 3n, 4n, and 5n neutron evaporation excitation functions they were able to detect three atoms of ^{289}Fl, twelve atoms of the new isotope ^{288}Fl, and one atom of the new isotope ^{287}Fl. Based on these results, the first atom to be detected was tentatively reassigned to ^{290}Fl or ^{289m}Fl, whilst the two subsequent atoms were reassigned to ^{289}Fl and therefore belong to the unofficial discovery experiment. In an attempt to study the chemistry of copernicium as the isotope ^{285}Cn, this reaction was repeated in April 2007. Surprisingly, a PSI-FLNR directly detected two atoms of ^{288}Fl forming the basis for the first chemical studies of flerovium.

In June 2008, the experiment was repeated in order to further assess the chemistry of the element using the ^{289}Fl isotope. A single atom was detected seeming to confirm the noble-gas-like properties of the element.

During May–July 2009, the team at GSI studied this reaction for the first time, as a first step towards the synthesis of tennessine. The team were able to confirm the synthesis and decay data for ^{288}Fl and ^{289}Fl, producing nine atoms of the former isotope and four atoms of the latter.

===== ^{242}Pu(^{48}Ca,xn)^{290−x}Fl (x=2,3,4,5) =====
The team at Dubna first studied this reaction in March–April 1999 and detected two atoms of flerovium, assigned to ^{287}Fl. The reaction was repeated in September 2003 in order to attempt to confirm the decay data for ^{287}Fl and ^{283}Cn since conflicting data for ^{283}Cn had been collected (see copernicium). The Russian scientists were able to measure decay data for ^{288}Fl, ^{287}Fl and the new isotope ^{286}Fl from the measurement of the 2n, 3n, and 4n excitation functions.

In April 2006, a PSI-FLNR collaboration used the reaction to determine the first chemical properties of copernicium by producing ^{283}Cn as an overshoot product. In a confirmatory experiment in April 2007, the team were able to detect ^{287}Fl directly and therefore measure some initial data on the atomic chemical properties of flerovium.

The team at Berkeley, using the Berkeley gas-filled separator (BGS), continued their studies using newly acquired ^{242}Pu targets by attempting the synthesis of flerovium in January 2009 using the above reaction. In September 2009, they reported that they had succeeded in detecting two atoms of flerovium, as ^{287}Fl and ^{286}Fl, confirming the decay properties reported at the FLNR, although the measured cross sections were slightly lower; however the statistics were of lower quality.

In April 2009, the collaboration of Paul Scherrer Institute (PSI) and Flerov Laboratory of Nuclear Reactions (FLNR) of JINR carried out another study of the chemistry of flerovium using this reaction. A single atom of ^{283}Cn was detected.

In December 2010, the team at the LBNL announced the synthesis of a single atom of the new isotope ^{285}Fl with the consequent observation of 5 new isotopes of daughter elements.

===== ^{239,240}Pu(^{48}Ca,xn)^{287,288−x}Fl (x=3 for ^{239}Pu; x=3, 4 for ^{240}Pu) =====
The FLNR had plans to study light isotopes of flerovium, formed in the reaction between ^{239}Pu or ^{240}Pu and ^{48}Ca: in particular, the decay products of ^{283}Fl and ^{284}Fl were expected to fill in the gap between the isotopes of the lighter superheavy elements formed by cold fusion with ^{208}Pb and ^{209}Bi targets and those formed by hot fusion with ^{48}Ca projectiles. These reactions were studied in 2015. One new isotope was found in both the ^{240}Pu(^{48}Ca,4n) and ^{239}Pu(^{48}Ca,3n) reactions, the rapidly spontaneously fissioning ^{284}Fl, giving a clear demarcation of the neutron-poor edge of the island of stability. Three atoms of ^{285}Fl were also produced. The Dubna team repeated their investigation of the ^{240}Pu+^{48}Ca reaction in 2017, observing three new consistent decay chains of ^{285}Fl, an additional decay chain from this nuclide that may pass through some isomeric states in its daughters, a chain that could be assigned to ^{287}Fl (likely stemming from ^{242}Pu impurities in the target), and some spontaneous fission events of which some could be from ^{284}Fl, though other interpretations including side reactions involving the evaporation of charged particles are also possible.

==== As a decay product ====
Most of the isotopes of flerovium have also been observed in the decay chains of livermorium and oganesson.

Evaporation residue	Observed Fl isotope
^{294}Lv ??	^{290}Fl ?
^{293}Lv	^{289}Fl
^{292}Lv	^{288}Fl
^{291}Lv	^{287}Fl
^{294}Og, ^{290}Lv	^{286}Fl
^{288}Lv	^{284}Fl

==== Retracted isotopes ====
===== ^{285}Fl =====
In the claimed synthesis of ^{293}Og in 1999, the isotope ^{285}Fl was identified as decaying by 11.35 MeV alpha emission with a half-life of 0.58 ms. The claim was retracted in 2001. This isotope was finally created in 2010 and its decay properties supported the fabrication of the previously published decay data.

==== Fission of compound nuclei with an atomic number of 114 ====
Several experiments have been performed between 2000 and 2004 at the Flerov Laboratory of Nuclear Reactions in Dubna studying the fission characteristics of the compound nucleus ^{292}Fl. The nuclear reaction used is ^{244}Pu+^{48}Ca. The results have revealed how nuclei such as this fission predominantly by expelling closed shell nuclei such as ^{132}Sn (Z = 50, N = 82). It was also found that the yield for the fusion-fission pathway was similar between ^{48}Ca and ^{58}Fe projectiles, indicating a possible future use of ^{58}Fe projectiles in superheavy element formation.

=== Nuclear isomerism ===
==== ^{289}Fl ====
In the first claimed synthesis of flerovium, an isotope assigned as ^{289}Fl decayed by emitting a 9.71 MeV alpha particle with a lifetime of 30 seconds. This activity was not observed in repetitions of the direct synthesis of this isotope. However, in a single case from the synthesis of ^{293}Lv, a decay chain was measured starting with the emission of a 9.63 MeV alpha particle with a lifetime of 2.7 minutes. All subsequent decays were very similar to that observed from ^{289}Fl, presuming that the parent decay was missed. This strongly suggests that the activity should be assigned to an isomeric level. The absence of the activity in recent experiments indicates that the yield of the isomer is ~20% compared to the supposed ground state and that the observation in the first experiment was a fortunate (or not as the case history indicates). Further research is required to resolve these issues.

It is possible that these decays are due to ^{290}Fl, as the beam energies in these early experiments were set quite low, low enough to make the 2n channel plausible. This assignment necessitates the postulation of undetected electron capture to ^{290}Nh, because it would otherwise be difficult to explain the long half-lives of the daughters of ^{290}Fl to spontaneous fission if they are all even-even. This would suggest that the erstwhile isomeric ^{289m}Fl, ^{285m}Cn, ^{281m}Ds, and ^{277m}Hs are thus actually ^{290}Nh (electron capture of ^{290}Fl having been missed, as current detectors are not sensitive to this decay mode), ^{286}Rg, ^{282}Mt, and the spontaneously fissioning ^{278}Bh, creating some of the most neutron-rich superheavy isotopes known to date: this fits well with the systematic trend of increasing half-life as neutrons are added to superheavy nuclei towards the beta-stability line, which this chain would then terminate very close to. The livermorium parent could then be assigned to ^{294}Lv, which would have the highest neutron number (178) of all known nuclei, but all these assignments need further confirmation through experiments aimed at reaching the 2n channel in the ^{244}Pu+^{48}Ca and ^{248}Cm+^{48}Ca reactions.

==== ^{287}Fl ====
In a manner similar to those for ^{289}Fl, first experiments with a ^{242}Pu target identified an isotope ^{287}Fl decaying by emission of a 10.29 MeV alpha particle with a lifetime of 5.5 seconds. The daughter spontaneously fissioned with a lifetime in accord with the previous synthesis of ^{283}Cn. Both these activities have not been observed since (see copernicium). However, the correlation suggests that the results are not random and are possible due to the formation of isomers whose yield is obviously dependent on production methods. Further research is required to unravel these discrepancies. It is also possible that this activity is due to the electron capture of a ^{287}Fl residue and actually stems from ^{287}Nh and its daughter ^{283}Rg.

Summary of observed alpha decay chains from superheavy elements with Z = 114, 116, 118, or 120 as of 2016. Assignments for dotted nuclides (including the early Dubna chains 5 and 8 containing ^{287}Nh and ^{290}Nh as alternative explanations instead of isomerism in ^{287m}Fl and ^{289m}Fl) are tentative. (Another analysis suggests that chain 3, starting from element 120, is not a real decay chain but a random sequence of events.)

=== Yields of isotopes ===
The tables below provide cross-sections and excitation energies for fusion reactions producing flerovium isotopes directly. Data in bold represent maxima derived from excitation function measurements. + represents an observed exit channel.

==== Cold fusion ====
Projectile	Target	CN	1n	2n	3n
^{76}Ge	^{208}Pb	^{284}Fl	<1.2 pb		

==== Hot fusion ====
Projectile	Target	CN	2n	3n	4n	5n
^{48}Ca	^{242}Pu	^{290}Fl	0.5 pb, 32.5 MeV	**3.6 pb, 40.0 MeV**	**4.5 pb, 40.0 MeV**	<1.4 pb, 45.0 MeV
^{48}Ca	^{244}Pu	^{292}Fl		**1.7 pb, 40.0 MeV**	**5.3 pb, 40.0 MeV**	1.1 pb, 52.0 MeV

=== Theoretical calculations ===
==== Evaporation residue cross sections ====
The below table contains various targets-projectile combinations for which calculations have provided estimates for cross section yields from various neutron evaporation channels. The channel with the highest expected yield is given.

MD = multi-dimensional; DNS = Dinuclear system; σ = cross section

Target	Projectile	CN	Channel (product)	σ_{max}	Model	Ref
^{208}Pb	^{76}Ge	^{284}Fl	1n (^{283}Fl)	60 fb	DNS	
^{208}Pb	^{73}Ge	^{281}Fl	1n (^{280}Fl)	0.2 pb	DNS	
^{238}U	^{50}Ti	^{288}Fl	2n (^{286}Fl)	60 fb	DNS	
^{238}U	^{48}Ti	^{286}Fl	2n (^{284}Fl)	45.1 fb	DNS	
^{244}Pu	^{48}Ca	^{292}Fl	4n (^{288}Fl)	4 pb	MD	
^{242}Pu	^{48}Ca	^{290}Fl	3n (^{287}Fl)	3 pb	MD	
^{250}Cm	^{40}Ar	^{290}Fl	4n (^{286}Fl)	79.6 fb	DNS	
^{248}Cm	^{40}Ar	^{288}Fl	4n (^{284}Fl)	35 fb	DNS	

==== Decay characteristics ====
Theoretical estimation of the alpha decay half-lives of the isotopes of the flerovium supports the experimental data. The fission-survived isotope ^{298}Fl is predicted to have alpha decay half-life around 17 days.

=== In search for the island of stability: ^{298}Fl ===
According to macroscopic-microscopic (MM) theory, Z = 114 might be the next spherical magic number. In the region of Z = 114, MM theory indicates that N = 184 is the next spherical neutron magic number and puts forward the nucleus ^{298}Fl as a strong candidate for the next spherical doubly magic nucleus, after ^{208}Pb (Z = 82, N = 126). ^{298}Fl is taken to be at the center of a hypothetical "island of stability" comprising longer-lived superheavy nuclei. However, other calculations using relativistic mean field (RMF) theory propose Z = 120, 122, and 126 as alternative proton magic numbers, depending upon the chosen set of parameters, and some entirely omit Z = 114 or N = 184. It is also possible that rather than a peak at a specific proton shell, there exists a plateau of proton shell effects from Z = 114–126.

The island of stability near ^{298}Fl is predicted to enhance stability for its constituent nuclei, especially against spontaneous fission as a consequence of greater fission barrier heights near the shell closure. Due to the expected high fission barriers, any nucleus within this island of stability will exclusively decay by alpha emission, and as such, the nucleus with the longest half-life may be ^{298}Fl; predictions for the half-life of this nucleus range from minutes to billions of years. It may be possible, however, that the longest-lived nuclide is not ^{298}Fl, but instead ^{297}Fl (with N = 183), with the unpaired neutron of the latter nuclide conferring additional stability. Other calculations suggest that stability instead peaks in beta-stable isotopes of darmstadtium or copernicium in the vicinity of N = 184 (with half-lives of several hundred years), with flerovium at the upper limit of the stability region.

==== Evidence for Z=114 closed proton shell ====
While evidence for closed neutron shells can be deemed directly from the systematic variation of Q_{α} values for ground-state to ground-state transitions, evidence for closed proton shells comes from (partial) spontaneous fission half-lives. Such data can sometimes be difficult to extract due to low production rates and weak SF branching. In the case of Z = 114, evidence for the effect of this proposed closed shell comes from the comparison between the nuclei pairings ^{282}Cn (T_{SF}1/2 = 0.8 ms) and ^{286}Fl (T_{SF}1/2 = 130 ms), and ^{284}Cn (T_{SF} = 97 ms) and ^{288}Fl (T_{SF} > 800 ms). Further evidence would come from the measurement of partial SF half-lives of nuclei with Z > 114, such as ^{290}Lv and ^{292}Og (both N = 174 isotones). The extraction of Z = 114 effects is complicated by the presence of a dominating N = 184 effect in this region.

==== Difficulty of synthesis of ^{298}Fl ====
The direct synthesis of the nucleus ^{298}Fl by a fusion-evaporation pathway is impossible with current technology, as no combination of available projectiles and targets may be used to populate nuclei with enough neutrons to be within the island of stability, and radioactive beams (such as ^{44}S) cannot be produced with sufficient intensities to make an experiment feasible.

It has been suggested that such a neutron-rich isotope can be formed by the quasifission (partial fusion followed by fission) of a massive nucleus. Such nuclei tend to fission with the formation of isotopes close to the closed shells Z = 20/N = 20 (^{40}Ca), Z = 50/N = 82 (^{132}Sn) or Z = 82/N = 126 (^{208}Pb/^{209}Bi). The multi-nucleon transfer reactions in collisions of actinide nuclei (such as uranium and curium) might be used to synthesize the neutron-rich superheavy nuclei located at the island of stability, especially if there are strong shell effects in the region of Z = 114. If this is indeed possible, one such reaction might be:

^{238}_{92}U + ^{238}_{92}U → ^{298}_{114}Fl + ^{178}_{70}Yb
