= Justice Livermore =

Justice Livermore may refer to:

- Arthur Livermore (1766–1853), associate justice and chief justice of the Superior Court of New Hampshire
- Samuel Livermore (1732–1803), chief justice of the New Hampshire Superior Court
