= Victor Ninov =

Bulgarian-American physicist (born 1959)

- Виктор Нинов
- Born: 27 June 1959 (age 67); People's Republic of Bulgaria
- Education: Technische Universität Darmstadt
- Known for: fraud investigation concerning the discovery of various superheavy elements
- Scientific career
- Fields: Nuclear physics
- Workplaces: University of California, Berkeley
- Thesis: Der gasgefüllte Separator als Separationsmethode zum Nachweis von Transuranen (1992)

Victor Ninov (Bulgarian: Виктор Нинов; born 27 June 1959) is a Bulgarian physicist and former researcher who worked primarily in creating superheavy elements. He is known for the co-discoveries of elements 110, 111, and 112 (darmstadtium, roentgenium, and copernicium, respectively). Ninov also claimed the creation of elements 116 and 118 (now livermorium and oganesson); however, an investigation conducted by the University of California, Berkeley concluded that he had falsified the evidence. The repercussions of the affair had an impact on the guidelines of conduct for several research institutions.

== Early life ==
Victor Ninov was born in Bulgaria in 1959. He grew up in the capital city of Sofia. In the 1970s, when Ninov was a teenager, he and his family left for West Germany, Shortly after the move, Victor's father went missing; he was found dead six months later in the Bulgarian foothills due to causes unknown.

== Career ==
Victor Ninov attended Technische Universität Darmstadt near Frankfurt, Germany. He distinguished himself as a very capable physicist: he was particularly good at building scientific instruments and coding analysis programs for them.

He was hired by the nearby German research center GSI (Helmholtzzentrum für Schwerionenforschung), where he completed his doctorate and pursued postdoctoral work creating new elements.

For his expertise, he was given sole control of the computer analysis program. Here, he became a rising star by co-discovering darmstadtium (element 110), roentgenium (element 111), and copernicium (element 112) by smashing ion beams into heavy elements using GSI's UNILAC (a type of particle accelerator) and analyzing the debris. Though an investigation later determined that the discovery of elements 110 and 112 included samples fabricated by Ninov, the overall results were validated on further examination, rendering his co-discovery legitimate. These discoveries were facilitated by Ninov's addition of a gas separator to the particle accelerator to help filter out everything but the heavy elements they were looking for.

After working at Stanford University, Ninov was hired by Lawrence Berkeley National Laboratory (LBNL) in 1996 as a world class expert in particle accelerator debris sensors and analysis programs.

== Fraud investigation ==
While working at LBNL, Ninov and his team pursued a hypothesis by Robert Smolańczuk, then a visiting fellow from Poland on a Fulbright scholarship, that element 118 could be formed at relatively low energies by smashing ^{86}Kr and ^{208}Pb isotopes together. This hypothesis was dubbed "Robert's magic recipe", and it was highly controversial at the time. Ninov initially doubted the hypothesis he was pursuing; he is quoted as saying, "We didn't know how many orders of magnitude he [Smolańczuk] was wrong".

As in some earlier research projects, Ninov had exclusive control of the data analysis program (LBNL's was called GOOSY) since he was the only team member who knew how to use it. In 1999, Ninov and his team reported sightings of element 118, almost exactly as in Smolańczuk's hypothesis, and a decay chain that also produced element 116. However, other laboratories were unable to reproduce the results.

Eager to prove their discovery, the team double-checked their instruments, and tried again. One more sighting was made by Ninov, but it was dismissed by a colleague and a formal investigation was launched. The original element 118 data were independently analysed. In the original binary data, there was no indication of the presence of element 118 or 116. The investigation eventually concluded that Ninov had fabricated the data.

Ninov, who had been placed on leave for the investigation, was dismissed. The rest of Ninov's team officially retracted their claims in 2002. There was also an investigation conducted into Ninov's previous unsupervised science at GSI; it was found that "two sightings were spuriously created" (one of element 110 and another of element 112). However these false sightings were found amongst a large amount of real data that still supported his co-discoveries of elements 110 and 112. The GSI investigation concluded that the discovery of those elements was legitimate.

The superheavy elements 116 and 118 were eventually discovered and verified in the Joint Institute for Nuclear Research in Dubna, Russia from 2000 to 2002. These elements were named livermorium and oganesson respectively. In 2010, some of the nuclides that were originally claimed as decay products of element 118 were truly synthesized at LBNL; the 2010 observations did not match the claimed 1999 data. Ninov has continued to maintain that he was innocent.

=== Impact on the scientific community ===
The findings shocked the scientific community as Ninov had been a highly respected physicist. In fact, Albert Ghiorso, a physicist who co-discovered 12 elements and a close collaborator of Glenn Seaborg, once called Ninov "a younger version of himself". It was also troubling that so many co-authors of the LBNL's 1999 paper had been unaware that their discoveries were false. The affair resulted in stricter guidelines for coauthors, clarifying their roles and duties and requiring them to vouch for their contributions to published work.

The American Physical Society called for increased ethical training and oversight at research institutions and sponsored educational efforts to make the scientific community more resilient to scientific fraud. Reports on the Ninov affair were released around the same time as the final report on the Schön affair, another major incident of data falsification in physics, and this amplified its impact.

== Personal life ==
His wife, Caroline Cox, a former history professor at University of the Pacific, died in 2014 of cancer. They were married for 23 years. Ninov had helped her finish her book, Boy Soldiers of the American Revolution, and it was published posthumously. He pilots a four-seat plane, an Aero Commander.

== See also ==
- List of experimental errors and frauds in physics
- List of scientific misconduct incidents
- Schön scandal
- Hwang scandal
