= Samuel Livermore (legal writer) =

American lawyer

Samuel Livermore (c. 1786–1833) was an American lawyer and legal writer, known for his works on agency law and conflict of laws. He was the author of the first American work on the conflict of laws.

== Biography ==
Livermore graduated from Phillips Exeter Academy in 1800 and from Harvard in 1804. He subsequently studied law and was admitted to the bar. He moved to New Orleans, where he lived until his death. Livermore authored two treatises on the law, A Treatise on the Law of Principal and Agent, and of Sales by Auction (Boston, 1811; republished in 2 vols., Baltimore, 1818), and Dissertations on the Questions which arise from the Contrariety of the Positive Laws of Different States and Nations (New Orleans, 1828), the latter work on conflict of laws.

He was also the author of a pamphlet on mortgage securities. In addition, he published at least one of his arguments before the Supreme Court regarding community property in common-law marriage.

Livermore's works continue to be cited in court decisions, most recently by the U.S. Supreme Court in Domino's Pizza, Inc. v. McDonald, 546 U.S. 470 (2006), which cited to Livermore's 1818 edition of Treatise for a principle of agency law.
