= Robert Smolańczuk =

Polish physicist

Robert Smolańczuk (born 17 April 1962) is a Polish theoretical physicist.

== Biography ==
Robert Smolańczuk was born in the town of Olecko, Poland, now located within the Warmian–Masurian Voivodeship. He received the master's degree in physics from the University of Warsaw in 1988, and late the doctorate from the Andrzej Sołtan Institute for Nuclear Studies in Otwock, Poland in 1996. In 2008, he received the habilitation from the same institute, in the specialisation in the theoretical nuclear physics. From 1998 to 2000, he had an internship at the Lawrence Berkeley National Laboratory in California, United States, as a participant in the Fulbright Program.

He predicted in late 1998 that a lead-and-krypton collision technique could produce the element oganesson, at that time considered impossible by most scientists involved in heavy-element research. This was experimentally attempted at LBNL in 1999 and appeared to have been successful, but an investigation determined that the data had been fabricated by Victor Ninov. It is now expected that this reaction is unlikely to succeed. Smolańczuk received the Nitschke Award in 1999 for developing a phenomenological model of synthesis of superheavy nuclei. He currently works at the National Centre for Nuclear Research in Otwock, Poland.
