= List of female nominees for the Nobel Prize =

Female nominees for the Nobel Prize

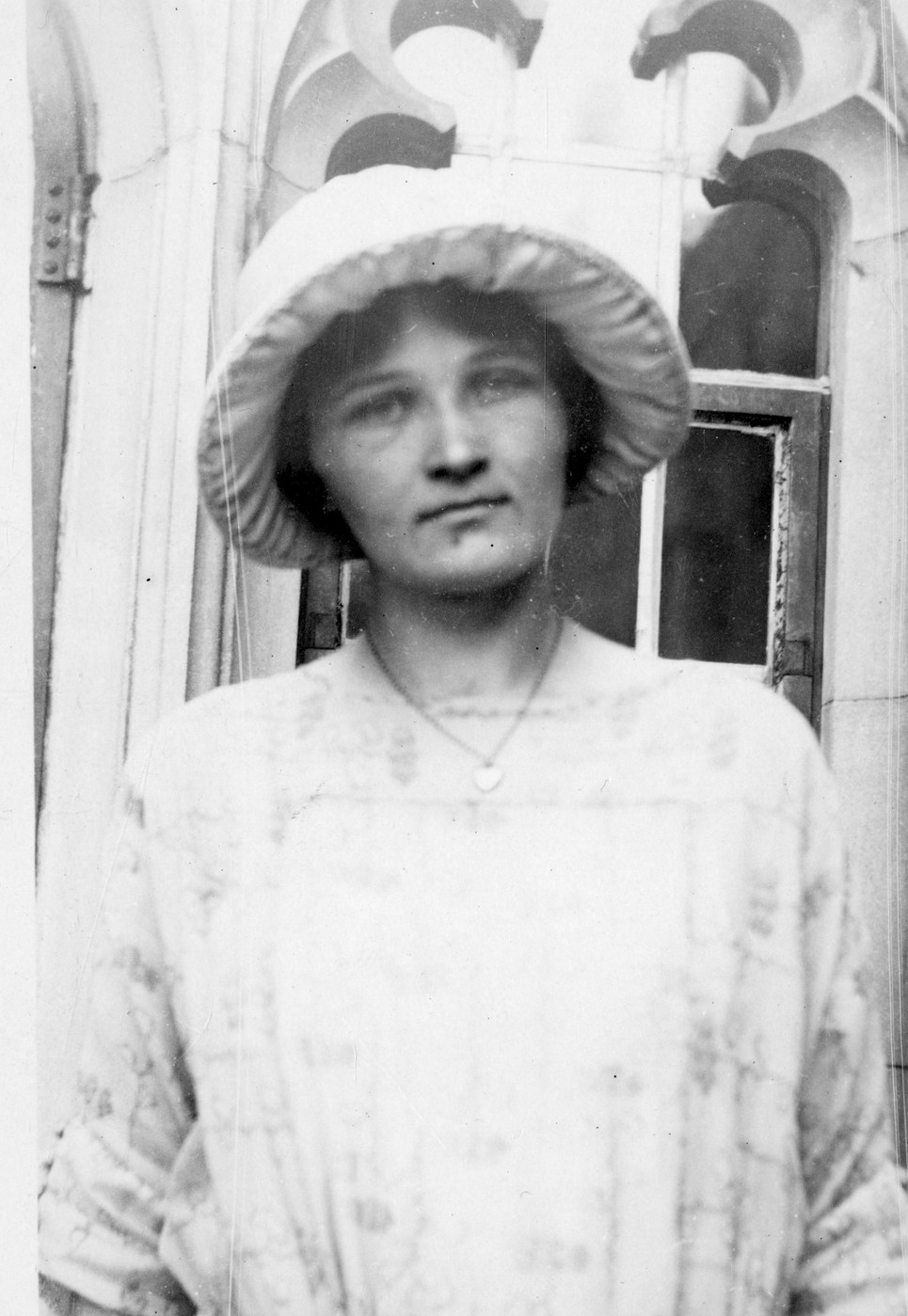
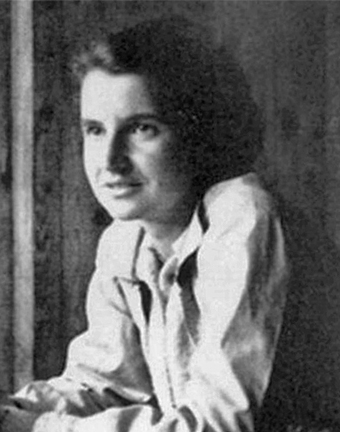
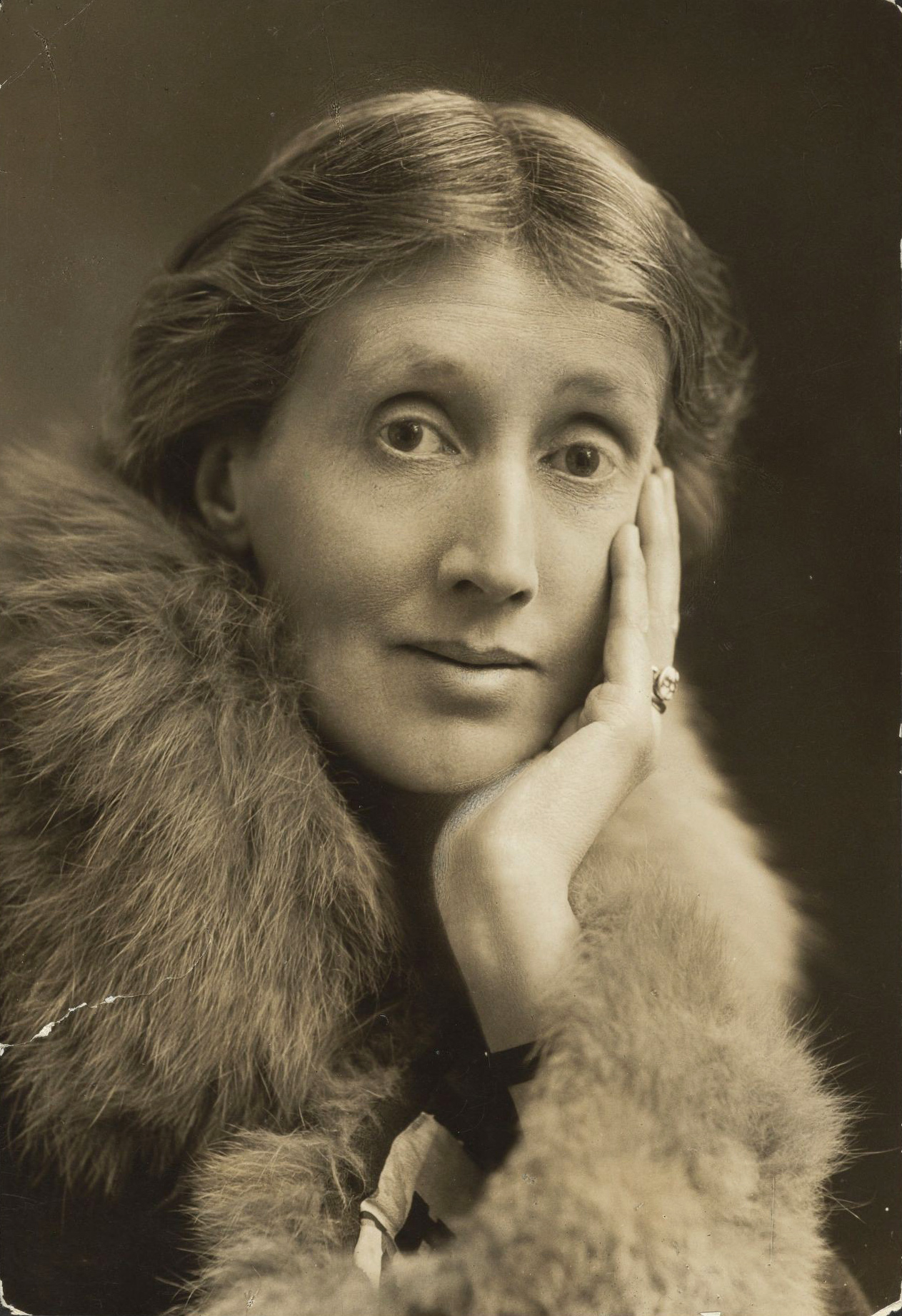
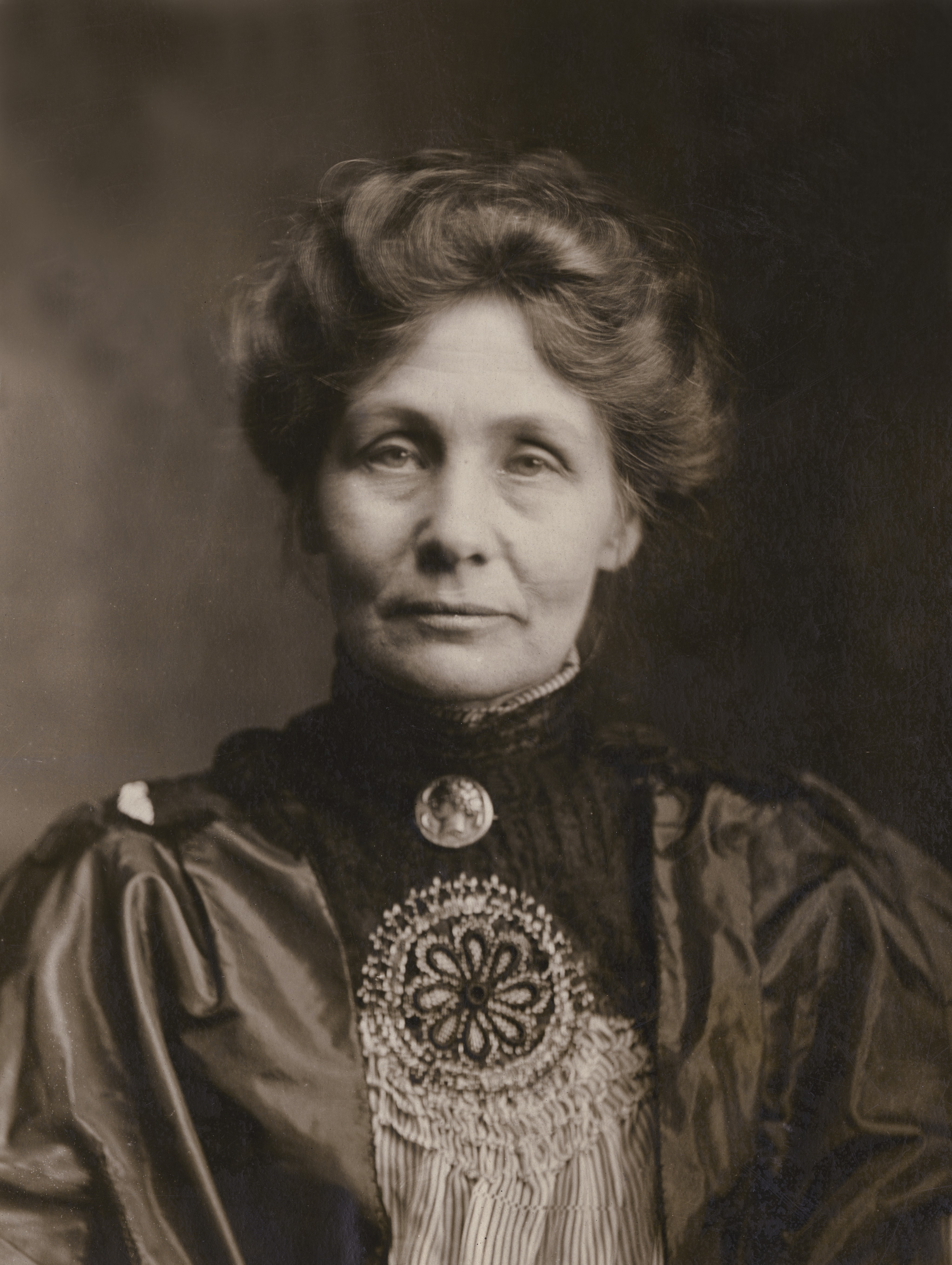
Clockwise from top left: Cecilia Payne-Gaposchkin, Rosalind Franklin, Emmeline Pankhurst and Virginia Woolf were among the influential 20th-century women who largely contributed in their fields but were never considered for the Nobel Prizes.

The Nobel Prize (Swedish: Nobelpriset) is a set of five different prizes that, according to its benefactor Alfred Nobel, in his 1895 will, must be awarded "to those who, during the preceding year, have conferred the greatest benefit to humankind". The five prizes are awarded in the fields of Physiology or Medicine, Physics, Chemistry, Literature, and Peace.

As of 2025, 68 Nobel Prizes and the Memorial Prize in Economic Sciences have been awarded to 67 women and since 1901, the year wherein the awarding of the prizes began, hundreds of women have already been nominated and shortlisted carefully in each field.

The first woman to win a Nobel Prize was Marie Curie, who won the Nobel Prize in Physics in 1903 with her husband, Pierre Curie, and Henri Becquerel. Curie is also the only woman to have won multiple Nobel Prizes; in 1911, she won the Nobel Prize in Chemistry. Curie's daughter, Irène Joliot-Curie, won the Nobel Prize in Chemistry in 1935, making the two the only mother-daughter pair to have won Nobel Prizes. Of the currently revealed female nominees both in physics and chemistry, the notable scientists Alice Ball, Henrietta Swan Leavitt, Harriet Brooks, Agnes Pockels, Margaret Eliza Maltby, Mileva Marić, Maud Menten, Elda Emma Anderson, Maria Lipp, Astrid Cleve, Hertha Sponer, Kathleen Lonsdale, Geertruida de Haas-Lorentz, Helen Parsons, Cecilia Payne-Gaposchkin, Katherine Burr Blodgett, Marie-Antoinette Tonnelat, Katharina Boll-Dornberger Elizabeth Rona and Leona Woods were not included.

In 1912, Mary Edwards Walker became the first ever woman nominated for prize in physiology or medicine but her nomination was later declared invalid by the Nobel Committee because her nominator was not invited to nominate that year. Hence, Cécile Vogt-Mugnier, nominated first in 1922, became the official first female nominee but never won despite numerous recommendations. She was followed by Maud Slye who was nominated in the year 1923, but again never won. Only in 1947, that the Nobel Prize in Physiology or Medicine was finally awarded to a woman, Gerty Cori, sharing with her husband Carl Ferdinand Cori. Of the currently revealed female nominees, the physiologists Nettie Stevens, María Orosa, Florence R. Sabin, Rosalind Franklin, Louise Pearce, Esther Killick, Hattie Alexander, Dorothy Hansine Andersen, Frieda Robscheit-Robbins, Virginia Apgar, Olga Bridgman and Alice Catherine Evans were not included.

The most number of female nominees was in the field of literature. The first woman to be nominated was the German memoirist Malwida von Meysenbug for the year 1901. She was nominated by the French historian Gabriel Monod but unfortunately did not win the prize. Her nomination was followed by Émilie Lerou and Selma Lagerlöf for the year 1904. Lagerlöf would later on become the first woman to win the prize in the year 1909. Of the 83 currently revealed female nominees for the literature category, the celebrated authors Kate Chopin, Sarah Orne Jewett, Delmira Agustini, Emilia Pardo Bazán, Edith Nesbit, Carmen de Burgos, Begum Rokeya, Lu Yin, Alfonsina Storni, Marina Tsvetaeva, Virginia Woolf, Simone Weil, Jelena Dimitrijević, Else Lasker-Schüler, Gertrude Stein, Emma Orczy, Edna St. Vincent Millay, Zora Neale Hurston, Edith Hamilton, Flannery O'Connor, Carson McCullers, Fannie Hurst, Nancy Mitford, Rosario Castellanos, Hannah Arendt, Agatha Christie, Clarice Lispector and Jean Rhys were not included.

The first women nominated for the Nobel Peace Prize were Belva Ann Lockwood and Bertha von Suttner, who would eventually be awarded in 1905. The latter was considered for authoring Lay Down Your Arms! and contributing to the creation of the Prize. Of the 64 currently revealed female nominees, the famous Susan B. Anthony, Florence Nightingale, Clara Barton, Harriet Tubman, Frances Xavier Cabrini, Millicent Fawcett, Mary Harris Jones, Olive Schreiner, Aletta Jacobs, Emmeline Pankhurst, Ida B. Wells, Käthe Kollwitz, Muriel Lester, Katharine Drexel, Helene Schweitzer, Marie Stopes, Virginia Gildersleeve, Vera Brittain, Bertha Lutz, Ava Helen Pauling, Golda Meir, Rachel Carson and Rosa Parks were not included. Based on leaked nominations, the youngest nominee in the category was Hind Rajab, a five-year-old Palestinian girl who was nominated posthumously in 2025.

== Physiology or Medicine ==
Starting from 1912 to 1953, 15 women have been nominated for the Nobel Prize in Physiology or Medicine wherein one was declared invalid, one was purportedly recommended and one was subsequently awarded.

Picture	Name	Born	Died	Years Nominated	Notes
1912
	Mary Edwards Walker (Note: "for the discovery of preventative of heart failure.")	26 November 1832; Oswego, New York, United States	21 February 1919; Oswego, New York, United States	1912 (Note: Nomination was declared invalid by the Nobel Committee, as A. S. Helton had not been invited to make a nomination for the Prize of 1912.)	Nominated by A. S. Helton.
1922
	Cécile Vogt-Mugnier (Note: "for work on the architectonics of the cerebral cortex, cortex localization and on the function of corpus striatum")	27 March 1875; Annecy, Haute-Savoie, French Third Republic (Note: Presently the Fifth French Republic.)	4 May 1962; Cambridge, United Kingdom	1922, 1923, 1926, 1928, 1929, 1930, 1950, 1951, 1953	Nominated jointly with Oskar Vogt each time.
1923
	Maud Slye (Note: "for work on cancer")	8 February 1879; Minneapolis, Minnesota, United States	17 September 1954; Chicago, Illinois, United States	1923	Nominated by Albert Soiland.
1925
	Gladys Dick (Note: "for work on the etiology, prevention and cure of scarlet fever")	18 December 1881; Pawnee City, Nebraska, United States	21 August 1963; Palo Alto, California, United States	1925, 1926, 1927, 1928, 1935	Nominated jointly with George Frederick Dick each time.
1930
	Alice Bernheim (Note: "for studies on the functional relations of calcium and the parathyroids in normal and deranged metabolism of man")	28 September 1878; Cincinnati, Ohio, United States	14 July 1968; Cincinnati, Ohio, United States	1930	Nominated by William Cogswell Clarke.
1939
	May Mellanby (Note: "for work on the relation of dietary deficiencies to human diseases. (Dental structure and dental disease.)")	9 September 1882; London, United Kingdom (Note: Then the United Kingdom of Great Britain and Ireland, presently the United Kingdom of Great Britain and Northern Ireland.)	5 March 1978; London, United Kingdom	1939	Nominated jointly with Edward Mellanby.
	Susan Gower Smith (Note: "for work on the use of nicotinic acid in the pellagra therapy")	9 December 1897; Greenville, South Carolina, United States	3 October 1983; Durham, North Carolina, United States	1939	Nominated jointly with David Tillerson Smith and Julian Ruffin; nominated by Osvaldo Polimanti.
1940
	Olive Watkins Smith (Note: "for investigation of a possible hormonal cause of toxemia of pregnancy")	29 April 1901; Worcester, Massachusetts, United States	1983; Brookline, Massachusetts, United States	1940 (Note: No Nobel Prize has been awarded this year.)	Nominated jointly with George Van Siclen Smith; nominated by Frank Arthur Pemberton.
1941
	Sona Valikhan [Vəlixan] (Note: "for outstanding achievements in the development of ophthalmology and the fight against trachoma")	19 June 1883; Kharkiv, Russian Empire (Note: Presently Ukraine.)	4 April 1982; Baku, Azerbaijan SSR, Soviet Union (Note: Presently the Republic of Azerbaijan.)	1941	Nominated by the Azerbaijan Medical Institute. (Note: In 1941, the Nobel Prize Committee purportedly presented Valikhan to the Nobel Prize in Medicine for outstanding achievements in the development of ophthalmology and the fight against trachoma, but because of the start of the World War II, the annual Nobel Prize was suspended.)
1946
	Gerty Cori (Note: "for work on enzymatic synthesis of glycogen and starch, effect of the anterior pituitary extract and of insulin on the hexokinase reaction")	15 August 1896; Prague, Austria-Hungary (Note: Presently the Czech Republic.)	25 October 1957; Glendale, Missouri, United States	1946, 1947	Awarded the 1947 Nobel Prize in Physiology or Medicine, shared with Carl Ferdinand Cori and Bernardo Houssay.
	Militsa Lyubimova-Engelhardt (Note: "for work on the chemistry of muscle and the discovery of the enzymatic properties of myosin")	26 December 1898; Kazan, Tatarstan, Russian Empire (Note: Presently the Russian Federation.)	22 December 1975; Moscow, Russia SFSR, Soviet Union	1946	Nominated jointly with Vladimir Engelgardt; nominated by Leon Orbeli.
1947
	Helen Taussig (Note: "for work on the surgical treatment of malformations of the heart")	24 May 1898; Cambridge, Massachusetts, United States	20 May 1986; Chester County, Pennsylvania, United States	1947, 1949, 1950, 1951, 1952, 1953	
1951
	Miriam Menkin (Note: "for work on fertilization and cell division of human ova in vitro")	8 August 1901; Riga, Russian Empire (Note: Presently the Republic of Latvia.)	8 June 1992; Boston, Massachusetts, United States	1951	Nominated jointly with John Rock and Roger Alfred Auguste Vendrely; nominated by Bożydar Szabuniewicz.
	Madge Macklin (Note: "for work on the inheritance of deafness and the proband method of analysis of human pedigree for inheritance of recessive traits")	6 February 1893; Philadelphia, Pennsylvania, United States	4 March 1962; Columbus, Ohio, United States	1951	Nominated by Charles Clifford Macklin.
1952
	Elizabeth Bugie (Note: "for the discovery of streptomycin, an antibiotic against Mycobacterium tuberculosis.")	5 October 1920; New Brunswick, New Jersey, United States	10 April 2001; New Brunswick, New Jersey, United States	1952	Nominated jointly with Selman Waksman and Albert Schatz; nominated by Jevrem Nedelkovitch.
1954–1974
should be revealed by Nobel Committee
Others (Note: The following nominations, though verified and features their respective years, are yet still to be organized as they may have been nominated in earlier years.)
1977
	Rosalyn Yalow	19 July 1921; New York City, New York, United States	30 May 2011; The Bronx, New York, United States	1977	Award the 1977 Nobel Prize in Physiology or Medicine, shared with Andrew V. Schally and Roger Guillemin.
1979
	Johanna Budwig	30 September 1908; Essen, Prussia, German Empire (Note: Presently the Federal Republic of Germany.)	19 May 2003; Freudenstadt, Baden-Württemberg, Germany	1979	
1983
	Barbara McClintock	16 June 1902; Hartford, Connecticut, United States	2 September 1992; Huntington, New York, United States	1983	Awarded the 1983 Nobel Prize in Physiology or Medicine.
1986
	Rita Levi-Montalcini	22 April 1909; Turin, Kingdom of Italy (Note: Presently the Italian Republic.)	30 December 2012; Rome, Italy	1986	Awarded the 1986 Nobel Prize in Physiology or Medicine, shared with Stanley Cohen.
1988
	Gertrude Elion	23 January 1918; New York City, New York, United States	21 February 1999; Chapel Hill, North Carolina, United States	1988	Awarded the 1988 Nobel Prize in Physiology or Medicine, shared with James W. Black and George H. Hitchings.
1993
	Louise Chow	1943; Hunan, Republic of China (Note: Presently the People's Republic of China.)	(aged 83)	1993	
1995
	Christiane Nüsslein-Volhard	20 October 1942; Magdeburg, Saxony-Anhalt, Nazi Germany	(aged 84)	1995	Awarded the 1995 Nobel Prize in Physiology or Medicine, shared with Edward B. Lewis and Eric F. Wieschaus.
2004
	Linda Buck	29 January 1947; Seattle, Washington, United States	(aged 79)	2004	Awarded the 2004 Nobel Prize in Physiology or Medicine, shared with Richard Axel.
2008
	Françoise Barré-Sinoussi	30 July 1947; Paris, French Fourth Republic	(aged 79)	2008	Awarded the 2008 Nobel Prize in Physiology or Medicine, shared with Luc Montagnier and Harald zur Hausen.
	Nubia Muñoz Calero	7 February 1940; Cali, Valle del Cauca, Colombia	(aged 86)	2008, 2019	
2009
	Elizabeth Blackburn	26 November 1948; Hobart, Tasmania, Australia	(aged 77)	2009	Awarded the 2009 Nobel Prize in Physiology or Medicine, shared with Jack W. Szostak.
	Carolyn Greider	15 April 1961; San Diego, California, United States	(aged 65)	2009	Awarded the 2009 Nobel Prize in Physiology or Medicine, shared with Jack W. Szostak.
2013
	Ingeborg Hochmair	17 January 1953; Vienna, Austria	(aged 73)	2013	
2014
	May-Britt Moser	4 January 1963; Fosnavåg, Norway	(aged 63)	2014	Awarded the 2014 Nobel Prize in Physiology or Medicine, shared with Edvard I. Moser and John O'Keefe.
2015
	Tú Yōuyōu	30 December 1930; Ningbo, Zhejiang, Republic of China	(aged 95)	2015	Awarded the 2015 Nobel Prize in Physiology or Medicine, shared with William C. Campbell and Satoshi Ōmura.
	Evelyn M. Witkin	9 March 1921; New York City, New York, United States	8 July 2023; Plainsboro Township, New Jersey, United States	2015	
2016
	Arlene Sharpe	1953; Gary, Indiana, United States	(aged 73)	2016 (Note: Clarivate Citation laureate)	
2017
	Yuan Chang	17 November 1959; Taipei, Taiwan	(aged 66)	2017	
2019
	Philippa Marrack	28 June 1945; Ewell, Surrey, England	(aged 81)	2019	
2020
	Pamela Bjorkman	21 June 1956; Portland, Oregon, United States	(aged 70)	2020	
	Huda Zoghbi	20 June 1954; Beirut, Lebanon	(aged 72)	2020	
2021
	Özlem Türeci	6 March 1967; Siegen, North Rhine-Westphalia, West Germany	(aged 59)	2021	
2022
	Virginia Man-Yee Lee	1945; Chongqing, Yuzhong, Republic of China	(aged 81)	2021	
	Mary-Claire King	27 February 1946; Wilmette, Illinois, United States	(aged 80)	2021	
2023
	Katalin Karikó	17 January 1955 Szolnok, Hungarian People's Republic (Note: Presently the Third Hungarian Republic.)	(aged 71)	2023	Awarded the 2023 Nobel Prize in Physiology or Medicine, shared with Drew Weissman.
	Lotte Bjerre Knudsen	"10 March 1964; Copenhagen, Denmark"	(aged 62)	2023, 2025	
	Svetlana Mojsov	8 December 1947; Skopje, North Macedonia	(aged 78)	2023, 2025	
2024
	Helen Hobbs	5 May 1952; Boston, Massachusetts, United States	(aged 74)	2024	
	Ann Graybiel	25 January 1942; Chestnut Hill, Massachusetts, United States	(aged 84)	2024	
2025
	Mary Brunkow	1961; Portland, Oregon, United States	(aged 65)	2025	Awarded the 2025 Nobel Prize in Physiology or Medicine, shared with Fred Ramsdell and Shimon Sakaguchi.
	Andrea Ablasser	13 July 1983; Bad Friedrichshall, Baden-Württemberg, West Germany	(aged 43)	2025	

== Physics ==
Starting from 1902 to 1974, 13 women have been nominated for the Nobel Prize in Physics and three of the nominees were subsequently awarded.

Picture	Name	Born	Died	Years Nominated	Notes
1902
	Marie Curie	7 November 1867; Warsaw, Congress of Poland, Russian Empire (Note: Presently the Republic of Poland.)	4 July 1934; Passy, Haute-Savoie, French Third Republic	1902, 1903	Awarded the 1903 Nobel Prize in Physics, shared with Henri Becquerel and Pierre Curie; also sole recipient of the 1911 Nobel Prize in Chemistry.
1935
	Irène Joliot-Curie	12 September 1897; Paris, French Third Republic	17 March 1956; Paris, French Fourth Republic	1934, 1935	Awarded the 1935 Nobel Prize in Chemistry, shared with Frédéric Joliot-Curie.
1937
	Lise Meitner	7 November 1878; Vienna, Austria-Hungary (Note: Presently the Second Austrian Republic.)	27 October 1968; Cambridge, United Kingdom	1937, 1940, 1941, 1943, 1945, 1946, 1947, 1948, 1949, 1954, 1955, 1956, 1959, 1961, 1964, 1965	Also nominated for the Nobel Prize in Chemistry.
1950
	Marietta Blau	29 April 1894; Vienna, Austria-Hungary	27 January 1970; Vienna, Austria	1950, 1956, 1957	Also nominated for the Nobel Prize in Chemistry.
	Hertha Wambacher (Note: Died before the prize was awarded.)	9 March 1903; Vienna, Austria-Hungary	25 March 1950; Vienna, Austria	1950	Nominated jointly with Marietta Blau; nominated by Erwin Schrödinger.
1955
	Maria Goeppert-Mayer	28 June 1906; Katowice, Prussia, German Empire	2 February 1972; San Diego, California, United States	1955, 1956, 1957, 1958, 1959, 1960, 1962, 1963	Awarded the 1963 Nobel Prize in Physics, shared with J. Hans D. Jensen.
1956
	Dorothy Hodgkin	12 May 1910; Cairo, Khedivate of Egypt (Note: Presently the Arab Republic of Egypt.)	29 July 1994; Ilmington, England, United Kingdom	1956, 1957, 1959, 1960, 1961	Awarded the 1964 Nobel Prize in Chemistry.
1958
	Chien-Shiung Wu	31 May 1912; Liuhe, Taicang, Republic of China	16 February 1997; New York City, New York, United States	1958, 1959, 1960, 1964, 1965, 1970, 1971, 1972, 1973, 1974	
1964
	Margaret Burbidge	12 August 1919; Stockport, England, United Kingdom	5 April 2020; San Francisco, California, United States	1964, 1973	
1970
	Jocelyn Bell Burnell	15 July 1943; Lurgan, Northern Ireland, United Kingdom	(aged 83)	1970 (Note: "Nomination 20866 to J.Bell has been hidden at the Nomination Archive site according to §8 of the statutes governing the Nobel archives of the Royal Swedish Academy of Sciences.")	(Note: “Data of Jocelyn Bell (id 15505) have been hidden at the Nomination Archive site according to §8 of the statutes governing the Nobel archives of the Royal Swedish Academy of Sciences”)
	Janine Connes	19 May 1926; Paris, French Third Republic	28 November 2024; Orsay, France	1970	Nominated jointly with Pierre Connes and Robert B. Leighton; nominated by Rupert Wildt.
1973
	Phyllis S. Freier	19 January 1921; Minneapolis, Minnesota, United States	18 December 1992; St. Paul, Minnesota, United States	1973	Nominated jointly with Edward P. Ney, Edward J. Lofgren and Frank Oppenheimer; nominated by Willard Libby.
	Isabella Karle	2 December 1921; Detroit, Michigan, United States	3 October 2017; Alexandria, Virginia, United States	1973	Nominated jointly with Herbert A. Hauptman, Jerome Karle and Michael Woolfson; nominated by Hans Wondratschek.
Others
2000
	Helen Quinn	19 May 1943; Melbourne, Victoria, Australia	(aged 83)	2000	
2008
	Vera Rubin	23 July 1928; Philadelphia, Pennsylvania, United States	25 December 2016; Princeton, New Jersey, United States	2008	
2010
	Mildred Dresselhaus	11 November 1930; Brooklyn, New York, United States	20 February 2017; Cambridge, Massachusetts, United States	2010, 2012	
2012
	Lene Hau	13 November 1959; Vejle, Denmark	(aged 67)	2012	
2013
	Margaret Geller	8 December 1947; Ithaca, New York, United States	(aged 78)	2013	
	Fabiola Gianotti	29 October 1960; Rome, Italy	(aged 66)	2013	
2015
	Deborah S. Jin	15 November 1968; Stanford, California, United States	15 September 2016; Boulder, Colorado, United States	2015	
2018
	Donna Strickland	27 May 1959; Guelph, Ontario, Canada	(aged 67)	2018	Awarded the 2018 Nobel Prize in Physics, shared with Gérard Mourou and Arthur Ashkin.
	Sandra Faber	28 December 1944; Boston, Massachusetts, United States	(aged 81)	2018	
2020
	Andrea Ghez	16 June 1965; New York City, New York, United States	(aged 61)	2020	Awarded the 2020 Nobel Prize in Physics, shared with Reinhard Genzel and Roger Penrose.
2023
	Anne L'Huillier	16 August 1958; Paris, French Fourth Republic	(aged 68)	2023	Awarded the 2023 Nobel Prize in Physics, shared with Ferenc Krausz and Pierre Agostini.
	Sharon Glotzer	October 1964; New York City, New York, United States	(aged 62)	2023	
2025
	Ingrid Daubechies	17 August 1954; Houthalen-Helchteren, Belgium	(aged 72)	2025	
	Ewine van Dishoeck	13 June 1955; Leiden, Netherlands	(aged 71)	2025	

== Chemistry ==
Starting 1911 to 1974, 15 women have been nominated for the Nobel Prize in Chemistry and 3 of these nominees were subsequently awarded.

Picture	Name	Born	Died	Years Nominated	Notes
1911
	Marie Curie	7 November 1867; Warsaw, Congress of Poland, Russian Empire	4 July 1934; Passy, Haute-Savoie, French Third Republic	1911	Awarded the 1911 Nobel Prize in Chemistry; had previously won the 1903 Nobel Prize in Physics with Henri Becquerel and Pierre Curie.
1924
	Lise Meitner	7 November 1878; Vienna, Austria-Hungary	27 October 1968; Cambridge, United Kingdom	1924, 1925, 1929, 1930, 1933, 1934, 1936, 1937, 1939, 1941, 1942, 1946, 1947, 1948	Also nominated for the Nobel Prize in Physics.
1933
	Ida Noddack	25 February 1896; Wesel, Prussia, German Empire	24 September 1978; Bad Neuenahr-Ahrweiler, Rhineland-Palatinate, West Germany	1933, 1935, 1937	Nominated jointly with Walter Noddack.
1935
	Irène Joliot-Curie	12 September 1897; Paris, French Third Republic	17 March 1956; Paris, French Fourth Republic	1935	Awarded the 1935 Nobel Prize in Chemistry, shared with Frédéric Joliot; also nominated for the Nobel Prize in Physics.
1939
	Dorothy Maud Wrinch	12 September 1894; Rosario, Santa Fe, Argentina	11 February 1976; Falmouth, Massachusetts, United States	1939	
1950
	Dorothy Hodgkin	12 May 1910; Cairo, Khedivate of Egypt	29 July 1994; Ilmington, England, United Kingdom	1950, 1956, 1957, 1959, 1960, 1961, 1962, 1963, 1964	Awarded the 1964 Nobel Prize in Chemistry; also nominated for the Nobel Prize in Physics.
	Thérèse Tréfouël	19 June 1892; Paris, French Third Republic	9 November 1978; Paris, France	1950	Nominated jointly with Jacques Tréfouël and Gladwyn Buttle.
1952
	Marguerite Perey	19 October 1909; Villemomble, Seine-Saint-Denis, French Third Republic	13 May 1975; Louveciennes, Yvelines, France	1952, 1958, 1961, 1965, 1966	
1956
	Joan Folkes	1927; Staffordshire, England, United Kingdom	(aged 99)	1956	Nominated jointly with Ernest Gale; nominated by John Howard Northrop.
1957
	Marietta Blau	29 April 1894; Vienna, Austria-Hungary	27 January 1970; Vienna, Austria	1957	Also nominated for the Nobel Prize in Physics.
1958
	Maria Goeppert-Mayer	28 June 1906; Katowice, Prussia, German Empire	2 February 1972; San Diego, California, United States	1958	Awarded the 1963 Nobel Prize in Physics.
1960
	Martha Chase	30 November 1927; Cleveland Heights, Ohio, United States	8 August 2003; Lorain, Ohio, United States	1960	Nominated jointly with Alfred Hershey, Alfred Gierer, Heinz Fraenkel-Conrat and Gerhard Schramm; nominated by John Howard Northrop.
1963
	Alberte Pullman	26 August 1920; Nantes, Loire-Atlantique, French Third Republic	7 January 2011; Paris, France	1963, 1965	Nominated jointly with Bernard Pullman each time.
1967
	Mary Belle Allen	11, November 1922; Morristown, New Jersey, United States	1973; Fairbanks, Alaska, United States	1967	Nominated jointly with Daniel I. Arnon and Frederick Whatley; nominated by John Howard Northrop.
1968
	Erika Cremer	20 May 1900; Munich, Kingdom of Bavaria, German Empire	21 September 1996; Innsbruck, Tyrol, Austria	1968	Nominated by Franz Patat.
1975
to be revealed by Nobel Committee in 2026
Others
1995
	Johanna Döbereiner	28 November 1924; Ústí nad Labem, Czechoslovakia	5 October 2000; Seropédica, Rio de Janeiro, Brazil	1995, 1997	
2009
	Ada Yonath	22 June 1939; Jerusalem, Mandatory Palestine (Note: Presently part of Israel and Palestine, see Status of Jerusalem for details.)	(aged 87)	2009	Awarded the 2009 Nobel Prize in Chemistry, shared with Venkatraman Ramakrishnan and Thomas A. Steitz.
	Jacqueline Barton	7 May 1952; New York City, New York, United States	(aged 74)	2009	
2015
	Emmanuelle Charpentier	11 December 1968; Juvisy-sur-Orge, Essonne, France	(aged 57)	2015, 2020	Awarded the 2020 Nobel Prize in Chemistry.
	Jennifer Doudna	19 February 1964; Washington, D.C., United States	(aged 61)	2015, 2020	Awarded the 2020 Nobel Prize in Chemistry.
	Carolyn Bertozzi	10 October 1966; Boston, Massachusetts, United States	(aged 60)	2015, 2022	Awarded the 2022 Nobel Prize in Chemistry, shared with Morten Meldal and Karl Barry Sharpless.
2016
	Svetlana Zaginaichenko	10 August 1957; Kyiv, Ukraine SSR, Soviet Union	23 November 2015; Dnipro, Ukraine	2016	
2018
	Frances Arnold	25 July 1956; Edgewood, Pennsylvania, United States	(aged 70)	2018	Awarded the 2018 Nobel Prize in Chemistry, shared with George P. Smith and Gregory Winter.
	JoAnne Stubbe	11 June 1946; Champaign, Illinois, United States	(aged 80)	2018	
2022
	Zhenan Bao	1970; Nanjing, Jiangsu, China	(aged 56)	2022	
	Bonnie Bassler	10 June 1962; Danville, California, United States	(aged 64)	2022	
2023
	Karen L. Wooley	9 July 1966; Oakridge, Oregon, United States	(aged 60)	2023	

== Literature ==
From 1901 to 1975, 89 women have been nominated for the Nobel Prize in Literature and 8 of these nominees were subsequently awarded.

Picture	Name	Born	Died	Years Nominated	Notes
1901
	Malwida von Meysenbug	28 October 1816; Kassel, Prussia, German Empire	23 April 1903; Rome, Kingdom of Italy	1901	Nominated by Gabriel Monod.
1904
	Selma Lagerlöf	20 November 1858; Värmland, Sweden-Norway (Note: Presently the Kingdom of Sweden.)	16 March 1940; Värmland, Sweden	1904, 1905, 1906, 1907, 1908, 1909	Awarded the 1909 Nobel Prize in Literature.
	Émilie Lerou	10 April 1855; Penne-d'Agenais, Lot-et-Garonne, France	10 February 1935; Valence d'Agen, Tarn-et-Garonne, France	1904	Nominated by Jules Claretie.
1905
	Eliza Orzeszkowa	6 June 1841; Mil'kovshchina, Russian Empire (Note: Presently the Republic of Belarus.)	18 May 1910; Grodno, Russian Empire	1905	
1908
	Elisabeth Förster-Nietzsche	10 July 1846; Lützen, Prussia, German Confederation	8 November 1935; Weimar, Nazi Germany	1908, 1916, 1917, 1923	
1910
	Molly Elliot Seawell	23 October 1860; Gloucester, Virginia, United States	15 November 1916; Washington, D.C., United States	1910, 1911	Nominated by Charles W. Kent each time.
	Marie von Ebner-Eschenbach	13 September 1830; Troubky-Zdislavice, Austrian Empire	12 March 1916; Vienna, Austria-Hungary	1910, 1911	Nominated by Emil Reich each time.
1913
	Grazia Deledda	28 September 1871; Nuoro, Italy	15 August 1936; Rome, Italy	1913, 1914, 1915, 1917, 1918, 1920, 1921, 1922, 1923, 1924, 1925, 1927	Awarded the 1926 Nobel Prize in Literature in 1927.
1914
	Dora Melegari	27 June 1849; Lausanne, Switzerland	31 July 1924; Rome, Italy	1914, 1923	
1922
	Sigrid Undset	20 May 1882; Kalundborg, Denmark	10 June 1949; Lillehammer, Norway	1922, 1925, 1926, 1928	Awarded the 1928 Nobel Prize in Literature.
	Matilde Serao	7 March 1856; Patras, Greece	25 July 1927; Naples, Italy	1922, 1923, 1924, 1925	
1926
	Sofía Casanova	30 September 1861; A Coruña, Spain	16 January 1958; Poznań, Poland	1926	
	Ada Negri	3 February 1870; Lodi, Italy	11 January 1945; Milan, Italy	1926, 1927	
	Concha Espina de la Serna	15 April 1869; Santander, Spain	19 May 1955; Madrid, Spain	1926, 1927, 1928, 1929, 1930, 1931, 1932, 1952, 1954	
1927
	Edith Wharton	24 January 1862; New York City, New York, United States	August 11, 1937; Saint-Brice-sous-Forêt, Val-d'Oise, France	1927, 1928, 1930	
1928
	Anna de Noailles	15 November 1876; Paris, France	30 April 1933; Paris, France	1928	Nominated by Tor Hedberg.
	Edith Howes	29 August 1872; London, England	14 June 1954; Dunedin, New Zealand	1928	Nominated by Francis Prendeville Wilson.
	Blanca de los Ríos Nostench	15 August 1956; Seville, Spain	13 April 1956; Madrid, Spain	1928	
	Ricarda Huch	18 July 1864; Braunschweig, Lower Saxony, Germany	17 November 1947; Kronberg, Hesse, Germany	1928, 1935, 1937, 1946	
1930
	Clotilde Crespo de Arvelo	19 September 1887; Los Teques, Miranda, Venezuela	20 June 1959; Caracas, Venezuela	1930	Nominated by Manuel María Villalobos.
1931
	Laura Mestre Hevia	6 April 1867; Havana, Cuba	11 January 1944; Havana, Cuba	1931	Nominated Juan Miguel Dihigo Mestre.
	Ivana Brlić-Mažuranić	18 April 1874; Ogulin, Croatia	21 September 1928; Zagreb, Croatia	1931, 1935, 1937, 1938	
1934
	Maria Madalena de Martel Patrício	19 April 1884; Lisbon, Portugal	3 November 1947; Lisbon, Portugal	1934, 1935, 1937, 1938, 1939, 1940, 1941, 1942, 1943, 1944, 1945, 1946, 1947	
1935
	Violet Clifton	2 November 1883; Rome, Italy	20 November 1961; Lytham St Annes, England	1935	Nominated by Nevill Coghill.
	Elise Richter	2 March 1865; Vienna, Austria	23 June 1943; Theresienstadt Ghetto, Terezín, Czechia	1935	
1936
	Enrica von Handel-Mazzetti	20 January 1871; Vienna, Austria	8 April 1955; Linz, Upper Austria, Austria	1936	
	Cécile Tormay	8 October 1875; Budapest, Hungary	2 April 1937; Gyöngyös, Hungary	1936, 1937	
1937
	Maria Jotuni	9 April 1880; Kuopio, Finland	30 September 1943; Helsinki, Finland	1937	Nominated by Viljo Tarkiainen.
	Sally Salminen	25 April 1906; Vårdö, Åland, Finland	18 July 1976; Copenhagen, Denmark	1937, 1938, 1939	
	Maila Talvio	17 October 1871; Hartola, Finland	6 January 1951; Helsinki, Finland	1937, 1939, 1947	
1938
	Pearl Buck	26 June 1892; Hillsboro, West Virginia, United States	6 March 1973; Danby, Vermont, United States	1938	Awarded the 1938 Nobel Prize in Literature; also nominated for the Nobel Peace Prize.
	Margaret Mitchell	8 November 1900; Atlanta, Georgia, United States	16 August 1949; Atlanta, Georgia, United States	1938	Nominated by Sven Hedin.
	Henriette Charasson	13 February 1884; Le Havre, Seine-Maritime, France	29 May 1972; Toulouse, France	1938, 1939, 1940, 1941, 1943, 1944, 1945, (Note: Nomination was declared invalid by the Nobel Committee) 1947, 1949, 1954, 1957	
1939
	Ethel Florence Richardson	3 January 1870; East Melbourne, Victoria, Australia	20 March 1946; Hastings, England	1939	Nominated by Sten Bodvar Liljegren.
	Henriette Roland Holst	24 December 1869; Noordwijk, South Holland, Netherlands	21 November 1952; Amsterdam, Netherlands	1939, 1950, 1952	
	Maria Dąbrowska	6 October 1889; Russów, Kalisz, Poland	19 May 1965; Warsaw, Poland	1939, 1957, 1959, 1960, 1965	
1940
	Gabriela Mistral	7 April 1889; Vicuña, Chile	10 January 1957; Hempstead, New York, United States	1940, 1941, 1942, 1943, 1944, 1945	Awarded the 1945 Nobel Prize in Literature.
1941
	Ruth Comfort Mitchell	21 July 1882; San Francisco, California, United States	18 February 1954; Los Gatos, California, United States	1941	
1943
	Elisaveta Bagryana	16 April 1893; Sofia, Bulgaria	23 March 1991; Sofia, Bulgaria	1943, 1944, 1945, 1969	
1944
	Willa Cather	7 December 1873; Gore, Virginia, United States	24 April 1947; New York City, New York, United States	1944 (Note: Permanent Secretary of the Swedish Academy Anders Österling revealed to the New York Times days before the announcement that Willa Cather, together with Ernest Hemingway, John Steinbeck, and Gabriela Mistral, was among the contenders for the 1944 prize. Despite the revelation, Cather's name has not been included in the archives.")	
1945
	Marie Under	27 March 1883; Tallinn, Estonia	25 September 1980; Stockholm, Sweden	1945, 1946, 1947, 1948, 1949, 1950, 1955, 1958, 1968, 1969, 1970, 1971, 1972, 1973, 1974, 1975	
1948
	Sidonie-Gabrielle Colette	28 January 1873; Saint-Sauveur-en-Puisaye, Yonne, France	3 August 1954; Paris, France	1948	Nominated by Claude Farrère.
	Dorothy Canfield Fisher	17 February 1879; Lawrence, Kansas, United States	9 November 1958; Arlington, Vermont, United States	1948, 1949	Nominated by David Baumgardt each time.
1950
	Karen Blixen	17 April 1885; Rungsted, Denmark	7 September 1962; Rungsted, Denmark	1950, 1955, 1956, 1957, 1958, 1959, 1960, 1961, 1962	
	Gertrud von Le Fort	11 October 1876; Minden, North Rhine–Westphalia, Germany	1 November 1971; Oberstdorf, Bavaria, Germany	1950, 1957, 1958, 1959, 1961, 1962, 1963	
1951
	María Enriqueta Camarillo	19 February 1872; Coatepec, Mexico	13 February 1968; Mexico City, Mexico	1951	Nominated by Leavitt Olds Wright.
	Katharine Susannah Prichard	4 December 1883; Levuka, Fiji	2 October 1969; Greenmount, Western Australia, Australia	1951	
1955
	Edith Sitwell	7 September 1887; Scarborough, England	9 December 1964; London, England	1955, 1958, 1959	
1956
	Melpo Axioti	15 July 1905; Athens, Greece	22 May 1973; Athens, Greece	1956	Nominated by André Bonnard.
	Marthe Bibesco	28 January 1886; Bucharest, Romania	28 November 1973; Paris, France	1956	
	Elizabeth Goudge	24 April 1900; Wells, England	1 April 1984; Oxfordshire, England	1956, 1959	Nominated by Edmond Privat each time.
1958
	Elizabeth Bowen	7 June 1899; Dublin, Ireland	22 February 1973; London, England	1958	Nominated by Roman Jakobson.
1959
	Juana de Ibarbourou	8 March 1892; Melo, Uruguay	15 July 1979; Montevideo, Uruguay	1959, 1960, 1963	
	María Raquel Adler	ca. 1900; Argentine Sea	28 July 1974; Bernal, Argentina	1959, 1965	
	Anna Seghers	19 November 1900; Mainz, Rhineland-Palatinate, Germany	1 June 1983; East Berlin, Germany	1959, 1967, 1968, 1969, 1972, 1975	
1960
	Marie Noël	16 February 1883; Auxerre, Yonne, France	23 December 1967; Auxerre, Yonne, France	1960	Nominated by Maurice Bemol.
1961
	Cora Sandel	20 December 1880; Oslo, Norway	3 April 1974; Uppsala, Sweden	1961	Nominated by Harald Ofstad.
	Giulia Scappino Murena	1902; Ferrara, Italy	1982; Bologna, Italy	1961, 1962	Nominated by Alfredo Galletti each time; also nominated for the Nobel Peace Prize.
	Simone de Beauvoir	9 January 1908; Paris, France	14 April 1986; Paris, France	1961, 1969, 1973, 1975	
1963
	Nelly Sachs	10 December 1891; Berlin, Germany	12 May 1970; Stockholm, Sweden	1963, 1964, 1965, 1966	Awarded the 1966 Nobel Prize in Literature, shared with Shmuel Yosef Agnon.
	Ingeborg Bachmann	25 June 1926; Klagenfurt, Carinthia, Austria	17 October 1973; Rome, Italy	1963	Nominated by Harald Patzer.
	Kate Roberts	13 February 1891; Rhosgadfan, Wales	4 April 1985; Denbigh, Wales	1963	Nominated by Idris Foster.
1964
	Ina Seidel	15 September 1885; Halle (Saale), Saxony-Anhalt, Germany	2 October 1974; Schäftlarn, Bavaria, Germany	1964	Nominated by Günther Jachmann.
	Judith Wright	31 May 1915; Armidale, New South Wales, Australia	25 June 2000; Canberra, Australia	1964, 1965, 1967	
	Katherine Anne Porter	15 May 1890; Indian Creek, Texas, United States	18 September 1980; Silver Spring, Maryland, United States	1964, 1965, 1966, 1967, 1968	
1965
	Marguerite Yourcenar	8 June 1903; Brussels, Belgium	17 December 1987; Northeast Harbor, Maine, United States	1965	Nominated Ida-Marie Frandon.
	Anna Akhmatova	28 June 1889; Odesa, Ukraine	5 March 1966; Moscow, Russia	1965, 1966	
	Marie Luise Kaschnitz	31 January 1901; Karlsruhe, Baden-Württemberg, Germany	10 October 1974; Rome, Italy	1965, 1967	Nominated by Hermann Tiemann each time.
1967
	Lina Kostenko	19 March 1930; Rzhyshchiv, Kyiv Oblast, Ukraine	(aged 96)	1967	Nominated jointly with Pavlo Tychyna and Ivan Drach; nominated by Omeljan Pritsak.
1968
	Marianne Moore	15 November 1887; Kirkwood, Missouri, United States	5 February 1972; New York City, New York, United States	1968	Nominated by Erik Lindegren.
	Mildred Breedlove	27 May 1904; Coal Hill, Arkansas, United States	14 August 1994; Ferron, Utah, United States	1968	Nominated by United Poets Laureate International.
1969
	Nathalie Sarraute	18 July 1900; Ivanovo-Voznesensk, Russia	19 October 1999; Paris, France	1969, 1975	
1970
	Victoria Ocampo	7 April 1890; Buenos Aires, Argentina	27 January 1979; Béccar, Argentina	1970, 1974, 1975	
1972
	Nadine Gordimer	20 November 1923; Springs, Gauteng, South Africa	13 July 2014; Johannesburg, South Africa	1972, 1973, 1974, 1975	Awarded the 1991 Nobel Prize in Literature.
	Doris Lessing	22 October 1919; Kermanshah, Iran	17 November 2013; London, England	1972, 1973, 1974, 1975	Awarded the 2007 Nobel Prize in Literature.
	Astrid Lindgren	14 November 1907; Vimmerby, Kalmar, Sweden	28 January 2002; Stockholm, Sweden	1972, 1974	
1973
	Indira Devi Dhanrajgir	17 August 1930; Hyderabad, Telangana, India	13 January 2026; Hyderabad, Telangana, India	1973	Nominated by Krishna Srinivas.
	Zenta Mauriņa	15 December 1897; Lejasciems, Latvia	25 April 1978; Basel, Switzerland	1973	Nominated by Mārtiņš Zīverts.
1974
	Gwen Bristow	16 September 1903; Marion, South Carolina, United States	17 August 1980; New Orleans, Louisiana, United States	1974	Nominated by Lorenz B. Graham.
	Chen Min-hwa	7 September 1934; Longkou, Shandong, China	(aged 92)	1974	Nominated by Emeterio Barcelón Barceló-Soriano (1897–1978).
	Argentina Díaz Lozano	5 December 1909; Santa Rosa de Copán, Honduras	13 August 1999; Tegucigalpa, Honduras	1974	
	Louise Weiss	25 January 1893; Arras, Pas-de-Calais, France	26 May 1983; Paris, France	1974	Also nominated for the Nobel Peace Prize.
	Kamala Surayya–Das	31 March 1934; Punnayurkulam, Kerala, India	31 May 2009; Pune, Maharashtra, India	1974, 1984	Nominated by K. P. Kannan(?).
1975
	Anna Banti	27 June 1895; Florence, Italy	2 September 1985; Massa, Massa-Carrara, Italy	1975	Nominated by Gustavo Costa (1930–2012) the only time.
	Tove Jansson	9 August 1914; Helsinki, Finland	27 June 2001; Helsinki, Finland	1975	
	Rina Lasnier	6 August 1915; Iberville, Quebec, Canada	9 May 1997; Saint-Jean-sur-Richelieu, Quebec, Canada	1975	
	Desanka Maksimović	16 May 1898; Valjevo, Serbia	11 February 1993; Belgrade, Serbia	1975	Nominated by Miljan Mojašević (1918–2002) the only time.
	Kamala Markandaya	23 June 1923; Mysore, Karnataka, India	16 May 2004; London, England	1975	Nominated by Horacio Serrano (1904–1980) the only time.
	Mary Renault	4 September 1905; Forest Gate, Essex, England	13 December 1983; Cape Town, South Africa	1975	Nominated by Hugh Finn (1925–) the only time.
Others
1976
	Anja Lundholm	28 April 1918; Düsseldorf, North Rhine-Westphalia, Germany	4 August 2007; Frankfurt, Hesse, Germany	1976	
	Anaïs Nin	21 February 1903; Neuilly-sur-Seine, Hauts-de-Seine, France	14 January 1977; Los Angeles, California, United States	1976	
1979
	Joyce Carol Oates	16 June 1938; Lockport, New York, United States	(aged 88)	1979, 1980, 1981, 1983, 1984, 1985, 1987, 1990, 1991, 1993, 1999, 2000, 2001, 2002, 2003, 2004, 2005, 2006, 2007, 2008, 2009, 2010, 2011, 2012, 2013, 2015, 2016, 2017, 2020, 2021, 2022, 2023, 2024, 2025	
1981
	Mary Kawena Pukui	20 April 1895; Kau, Hawaii, United States	21 May 1986; Honolulu, Hawaii, United States	1981	
1984
	Andrée Chedid	20 March 1920; Cairo, Egypt	6 February 2011; Paris, France	1984	
1985
	Ding Ling	12 October 1904; Linli, Hunan, China	4 March 1986; Beijing, China	1985	
	Susan Howe	10 June 1937; Boston, Massachusetts, United States	(aged 89)	1985, 1987	
1987
	Christa Wolf	18 March 1929; Gorzów Wielkopolski, Lubusz, Poland	1 December 2011; Berlin, Germany	1987, 1988, 1990, 1991, 1996, 1999, 2004, 2007	
1988
	Marguerite Duras	4 April 1914; Ho Chi Minh, Vietnam	3 March 1996; Paris, France	1988, 1990, 1991, 1992	
1989
	Ana María Matute	26 July 1925; Barcelona, Spain	25 June 2014; Barcelona, Spain	1989	
	Joan Didion	5 December 1934; Sacramento, California, United States	23 December 2021; New York City, United States	1989, 2015, 2016, 2017, 2020, 2021	
1990
	Maria Luisa Spaziani	7 December 1922; Turin, Italy	30 June 2014; Rome, Italy	1990, 1992, 1997	
	Margaret Atwood	18 November 1939; Ottawa, Canada	(aged 86)	1990, 1993, 1996, 2000, 2001, 2002, 2003, 2004, 2005, 2006, 2007, 2008, 2009, 2010, 2015, 2016, 2017, 2019, 2020, 2021, 2022, 2023, 2024, 2025	
1991
	Patricia Highsmith	19 January 1921; Fort Worth, Texas, United States	4 February 1995; Locarno, Switzerland	1991	
	Janet Frame	28 August 1924; Dunedin, New Zealand	29 January 2004; Dunedin, New Zealand	1991, 1995, 1998, 2001, 2002, 2003	
1992
	Matilde Alba Swann	24 February 1912; Berisso, Argentina	13 September 2000; La Plata, Argentina	1992	
	Vizma Belševica	30 May 1931; Riga, Latvia	6 August 2005; Riga, Latvia	1992, 2000, 2001, 2002, 2004	
1993
	Toni Morrison	18 February 1931; Lorain, Ohio, United States	5 August 2019; New York City, New York, United States	1993	Awarded the 1993 Nobel Prize in Literature.
1994
	Wisława Szymborska	2 July 1923; Kórnik, Poznań, Poland	1 February 2012; Kraków, Poland	1994, 1995, 1996	Awarded the 1996 Nobel Prize in Literature.
1995
	Friederike Mayröcker	20 December 1924; Vienna, Austria	4 June 2021; Vienna, Austria	1995, 2004, 2020	
1996
	Iris Murdoch	15 July 1919; Phibsborough, Dublin, Ireland	8 February 1999; Oxford, England	1996	
	Alda Merini	21 March 1931; Milan, Italy	1 November 2009; Milan, Italy	1996, 2001	
	Inger Christensen	16 January 1935; Vejle, Denmark	2 January 2009; Copenhagen, Denmark	1996, 2001, 2002, 2003, 2004, 2005, 2006, 2007	
1997
	Alicia Ghiragossian	13 July 1936; Córdoba, Argentina	22 May 2014; Los Angeles, California, United States	1997	
1998
	Agustina Bessa-Luís	15 October 1922; Amarante, Portugal	3 June 2019; Porto, Portugal	1998, 2018	
1999
	Simin Behbahani	20 July 1927; Tehran, Iran	19 August 2014; Tehran, Iran	1999, 2002	
2000
	Alice Munro	10 July 1931; Wingham, Ontario, Canada	13 May 2024; Port Hope, Ontario, Canada	2000, 2002, 2004, 2005, 2006, 2007, 2008, 2009, 2010, 2013	Awarded the 2013 Nobel Prize in Literature.
2001
	Herta Müller	17 August 1953; Nițchidorf, Romania	(aged 73)	2001, 2006, 2007, 2008, 2009	Awarded the 2009 Nobel Prize in Literature.
	Sophia de Mello Breyner Andresen	6 November 1919; Porto, Portugal	2 July 2004; Lisbon, Portugal	2001	
	Assia Djebar	30 June 1936; Cherchell, Tipaza, Algeria	6 February 2015; Paris, France	2001, 2002, 2003, 2004, 2005, 2006, 2007, 2008, 2009, 2010, 2013	
2002
	Leyla Erbil	12 January 1931; Istanbul, Türkiye	19 July 2013; Istanbul, Türkiye	2002	
	Susan Sontag	16 January 1933; New York City, United States	28 December 2004; New York City, United States	2002, 2003, 2004	
2003
	Elfriede Jelinek	20 October 1946; Mürzzuschlag, Styria, Austria	(aged 80)	2003, 2004	Awarded the 2004 Nobel Prize in Literature.
	Svetlana Alexievich	31 May 1948; Ivano-Frankivsk, Ukraine	(aged 78)	2003, 2004, 2006, 2014, 2015	Awarded the 2015 Nobel Prize in Literature.
	Klára Jarunková	28 April 1922; Šumiac, Brezno, Slovakia	11 July 2005; Bratislava, Slovakia	2003	
	Giovanna Mulas	6 May 1969; Nuoro, Sardinia, Italy	(aged 57)	2003	
2004
	Muriel Spark	1 February 1918; Edinburgh, Scotland	13 April 2006; Uliveto Terme, Pisa, Italy	2004	
	Isabel Allende	2 August 1942; Lima, Peru	(aged 84)	2004, 2025	
2005
	Anne-Marie Albiach	9 August 1937; Saint-Nazaire, Loire-Atlantique, France	4 November 2012; Neuilly-sur-Seine, Hauts-de-Seine, France	2005	
	Nancy Morejón	7 August 1944; Havana, Cuba	(aged 82)	2005	
	Adrienne Rich	16 May 1929; Baltimore, Maryland, United States	27 March 2012; Santa Cruz, California, United States	2005	
	Luisa Valenzuela	26 November 1938; Buenos Aires, Argentina	(aged 87)	2005	
	Eeva Kilpi	18 February 1928; Khiytola, Karelia, Russia	(aged 98)	2005, 2009, 2015	
	Maryse Condé	11 February 1934; Pointe-à-Pitre, Guadeloupe	2 April 2024; Apt, Vaucluse, France	2005, 2007, 2015, 2019, 2020, 2021, 2022, 2023	
	Adélia Prado	13 December 1935; Divinópolis, Minas Gerais, Brazil	(aged 90)	2005, 2025	
	Dương Thu Hương	1947; Thái Bình, Vietnam	(aged 79)	2005, 2009, 2020, 2021, 2024, 2025	
	Hélène Cixous	5 June 1937; Oran, Algeria	(aged 89)	2005, 2021, 2022, 2024, 2025	
2006
	Hanna Krall	20 May 1935; Warsaw, Poland	(aged 91)	2006	
	Elena Poniatowska	19 May 1932; Paris, France	(aged 94)	2006, 2023, 2025	
2007
	Luz Pozo Garza	21 July 1922; Ribadeo, Lugo, Spain	20 April 2020; A Coruña, Spain	2007	
2008
	Marjorie Boulton	7 May 1924; Teddington, Greater London, England	30 August 2017; London, England	2008	
	Mahasweta Devi	14 January 1926; Dhaka, Bangladesh	28 July 2016; Kolkata, West Bengal, India	2008, 2009, 2012	
	Antonia Susan Byatt	24 August 1936; Sheffield, South Yorkshire, England	16 November 2023; London, England	2008, 2009, 2015, 2016, 2017	
2009
	Maya Angelou	4 April 1928; St. Louis, Missouri, United States	28 May 2014; Winston-Salem, North Carolina, United States	2009	
	Beryl Bainbridge	21 November 1934; Liverpool, England	2 July 2010; London, England	2009	
	Marge Piercy	31 March 1936; Detroit, Michigan, United States	(aged 90)	2009	
	Gitta Sereny	13 March 1921; Vienna, Austria	14 June 2012; Cambridge, England	2009, 2010	
2010
	Jeanette Winterson	27 August 1959; Manchester, England	(aged 67)	2010	
	Rosmarie Waldrop	24 August 1935; Kitzingen, Bavaria, Germany	(aged 91)	2010	
	Anne Carson	21 June 1950; Toronto, Ontario, Canada	(aged 76)	2010, 2015, 2019, 2020, 2021, 2022, 2023, 2024, 2025	
2011
	Nawal El Saadawi	22 October 1931; Kafr Tahla, Qalyubiyya, Egypt	21 March 2021; Cairo, Egypt	2011, 2012, 2015, 2016, 2017, 2019, 2020, 2021	
2012
	Olga Tokarczuk	29 January 1962; Sulechów, Zielona Góra, Poland	(aged 64)	2012, 2016, 2017, 2018, 2019	Awarded the 2018 Nobel Prize in Literature in 2019.
	Sofi Oksanen	7 January 1977; Jyväskylä, Finland	(aged 49)	2012	
	Dacia Maraini	13 November 1936; Florence, Italy	(aged 90)	2012, 2015, 2016, 2017, 2019	
2015
	Merethe Lindstrøm	26 May 1963; Bergen, Norway	(aged 75)	2015, 2017	
	Lydia Davis	15 July 1947; Northampton, Massachusetts, United States	(aged 79)	2015, 2016, 2017	
	Ursula Le Guin	21 October 1929; Berkeley, California, United States	22 January 2018; Portland, Oregon, United States	2015, 2016, 2017	
	Anna Nerkagi	15 February 1951; Yamalo-Nenets, Russia	(aged 75)	2015, 2018, 2020	
	Dubravka Ugrešić	27 March 1949; Kutina, Sisak-Moslavina, Croatia	17 March 2023; Amsterdam, Netherlands	2015, 2016, 2017, 2019, 2021, 2022	
	Hilary Mantel	6 July 1952; Glossop, Derbyshire, England	22 September 2022; Exeter, Devon, England	2015, 2016, 2017, 2020, 2021, 2022	
	Lyudmila Ulitskaya	21 February 1943; Davlekanovo, Bashkortostan, Russia	(aged 83)	2015, 2020, 2021, 2022, 2023, 2024, 2025	
	Marilynne Robinson	26 November 1943; Sandpoint, Idaho, United States	(aged 82)	2015, 2016, 2017, 2019, 2020, 2021, 2022, 2023, 2024, 2025	
2016
	Lygia Fagundes Telles	19 April 1918; São Paulo, Brazil	3 April 2022; São Paulo, Brazil	2016	
	Tess Osonye Onwueme	8 September 1955; Ogwashi Ukwu, Delta, Nigeria	(aged 71)	2016	
	Doris Kareva	28 November 1958; Tallinn, Estonia	(aged 67)	2016, 2017, 2019	
2019
	Yoko Tawada	23 March 1960; Nakano, Tokyo, Japan	(aged 66)	2019, 2024, 2025	
	Can Xue	30 May 1953; Changsha, Hunan, China	(aged 73)	2019, 2020, 2021, 2022, 2023, 2024, 2025	
2020
	Louise Glück	22 April 1943; New York City, New York, United States	13 October 2023; Cambridge, Massachusetts, United States	2020	Awarded the 2020 Nobel Prize in Literature.
	Annie Ernaux	1 September 1940; Lillebonne, Seine-Maritime, France	(aged 86)	2020, 2021, 2022	Awarded the 2022 Nobel Prize in Literature.
	Etel Adnan	24 February 1925; Beirut, Lebanon	14 November 2021; Paris, France	2020	
	Giovanna Giordano	12 November 1961; Milan, Italy	(aged 65)	2020	
	Lorna Goodison	1 August 1947; Kingston, Jamaica	(aged 79)	2020	
	Ama Ata Aidoo	23 March 1942; Abeadzi Kyiakor, Saltpond, Ghana	31 May 2023; Accra, Ghana	2020, 2021	
	Edna O'Brien	15 December 1930; Tuamgraney, Ireland	27 July 2024; London, England	2020, 2021, 2022, 2023	
	Jamaica Kincaid	25 May 1949; St. John's, Antigua and Barbuda	(aged 77)	2020, 2021, 2022, 2023, 2024, 2025	
	Scholastique Mukasonga	20 December 1956; Gikongoro, Rwanda	(aged 69)	2020, 2021, 2022, 2023, 2024, 2025	
2021
	Xi Xi	7 October 1937; Shanghai, China	18 December 2022; Hong Kong	2021, 2022	
	Chimamanda Ngozi Adichie	15 September 1977; Enugu, Nigeria	(aged 49)	2021, 2022, 2023, 2024, 2025	
	Zoë Wicomb	23 November 1948; Vanrhynsdorp, Western Cape, South Africa	13 October 2025; Glasgow, Scotland	2021, 2022, 2023, 2024, 2025	
2022
	Edwidge Danticat	19 January 1969; Port-au-Prince, Haiti	(aged 57)	2022	
	Claudia Lee Hae-in	7 June 1945; Yanggu, Gangwon, South Korea	(aged 81)	2022	
	Shahrnush Parsipur	17 February 1946; Tehran, Iran	(aged 80)	2022	
	Marie NDiaye	4 June 1967; Pithiviers, Loiret, France	(aged 59)	2022, 2023, 2024, 2025	
	Martha Nussbaum	6 May 1947; New York City, New York, United States	(aged 79)	2022, 2023, 2024, 2025	
	Ali Smith	24 August 1962; Inverness, Scotland	(aged 64)	2022, 2023, 2024, 2025	
2023
	Han Kang	27 November 1970; Gwangju, South Korea	(aged 55)	2023, 2024	Awarded the 2024 Nobel Prize in Literature
	Helle Helle	14 December 1965; Nakskov, Lolland, Denmark	(aged 60)	2023, 2025	
	Mieko Kanai	3 November 1947; Takasaki, Gunma, Japan	(aged 79)	2023, 2024, 2025	
	Joanne Rowling	31 July 1965; Yate, Gloucestershire, England	(aged 61)	2023, 2024, 2025	
	Ida Vitale	2 November 1923; Montevideo, Uruguay	(aged 103)	2023, 2024, 2025	
	Alexis Wright	25 November 1950; Cloncurry, Queensland, Australia	(aged 75)	2023, 2024, 2025	
2024
	Maria Tedeschi	3 January 1972; Naples, Italy	(aged 54)	2024	
	Paulina Chiziane	4 June 1955; Manjacaze, Gaza, Mozambique	(aged 71)	2024, 2025	
	Ananda Devi	23 March 1957; Trois-Boutiques, Grand Port, Mauritius	(aged 69)	2024, 2025	
	Louise Erdrich	7 June 1954; Little Falls, Minnesota, United States	(aged 72)	2024, 2025	
	Patricia Grace	17 August 1937; Wellington, New Zealand	(aged 89)	2024, 2025	
	Joy Harjo	9 May 1951; Tulsa, Oklahoma, United States	(aged 75)	2024, 2025	
	Leslie Marmon Silko	5 March 1948; Albuquerque, New Mexico, United States	(aged 78)	2024, 2025	
	Ersi Sotiropoulou	1953; Patras, Greece	(aged 73)	2024, 2025	
	Xiaolu Guo	20 November 1973; Wenling, Zhejiang, China	(aged 52)	2024, 2025	
2025
	Helen Garner	7 November 1942; Geelong, Victoria, Australia	(aged 84)	2025	
	Cristina Peri Rossi	12 November 1941; Montevideo, Uruguay	(aged 85)	2025	
	Cristina Rivera Garza	1 October 1964; Matamoros, Tamaulipas, Mexico	(aged 62)	2025	
	Astrid Roemer	27 April 1947; Paramaribo, Suriname	8 January 2026; Paramaribo, Suriname	2025	

== Peace ==
From 1901 to 1976, 64 women have been nominated for the Nobel Peace Prize and five of these nominees were subsequently awarded. Currently, the Nobel archives has revealed nominations from 1901 to 1976, the other enlisted women were verified nominations based on public and private news agencies.

Picture	Name	Born	Died	Years Nominated	Notes
1901
	Bertha Sophie von Suttner	9 June 1843; Prague, Czechia	21 June 1914; Vienna, Austria	1901, 1902, 1903, 1904, 1905	Awarded the 1905 Nobel Peace Prize.
	Belva Ann Lockwood	24 October 1830; Royalton, New York, United States	19 May 1917; Washington, D.C., United States	1901, 1914	
1903
	Priscilla Hannah Peckover	27 October 1833; Wisbech, England, United Kingdom	8 September 1931; Wisbech, England, United Kingdom	1903, 1905, 1911, 1913	
1904
	Henriette Verdier Winteler de Weindeck	9 January 1832; London, United Kingdom	20 March 1910; London, United Kingdom	1904, 1905, 1907, 1910	
1910
	Ángela de Oliveira Cézar de Costa	ca. 1860; Gualeguaychú, Entre Ríos, Argentina	25 June 1940; Buenos Aires, Argentina	1910, 1911	
1913
	Anna Bernhardine Eckstein	14 June 1868; Coburg, Bavaria, Germany	16 October 1947; Coburg, Bavaria, Germany	1913	Nominated by Nils August Nilsson.
	Lucia Ames Mead	5 May 1856; Boscawen, New Hampshire, United States	1 November 1936; Boston, Massachusetts, United States	1913	Nominated jointly with her husband Edwin Doak Mead; nominated by Samuel Train Dutton.
1916
	Jane Addams	6 September 1860; Cedarville, Illinois, United States	21 May 1935; Chicago, Illinois, United States	1916, 1923, 1924, 1925, 1928, 1929, 1930, 1931	Awarded the 1931 Nobel Peace Prize.
1917
	Rosika Schwimmer	11 September 1877; Budapest, Hungary	3 August 1948; New York City, New York, United States	1917, 1948	
1918
	Mary Shapard	c. 1882; Mississippi, United States	c. 1950s Texas, United States	1918, 1919	Nominated by Morris Sheppard.
1920
	Caroline Rémy de Guebhard	27 April 1855; Paris, France	24 April 1929; Pierrefonds, Oise, France	1920, 1922, 1924, 1927, 1929	Nominated by Lucien Le Foyer each time.
1922
	Eglantyne Jebb	25 August 1876; Ellesmere, England, United Kingdom	17 December 1928; Geneva, Switzerland	1922	
	Elsa Brändström	26 March 1888; Saint Petersburg, Russia	4 March 1948; Boston, Massachusetts, United States	1922, 1923, 1928, 1929	
1931
	Annie Wood Besant	1 October 1847; Clapham, Greater London, England	September 20, 1933; Adyar, Chennai, Tamil Nadu, India	1931	Nominated by Peter Freeman.
	Ishbel Hamilton-Gordon	15 March 1857; London, England	18 April 1939; Rubislaw, Aberdeen, Scotland	1931, 1932, 1935, 1936, 1937	
1933
	Margit Antonia Bárczy	29 November 1877; Budapest, Hungary	26 March 1934; Paris, France	1933	Nominated by Charles Dupuis.
1935
	Janet Miller	30 September 1873; Fayette, Missouri, United States	20 April 1958; Marlin, Texas, United States	1935	
	Julie Bikle	8 January 1871; Lucerne, Switzerland	11 May 1962; Winterthur, Zürich, Switzerland	1935, 1936, 1937, 1940	
1936
	Moina Belle Michael	15 August 1869; Good Hope, Georgia, United States	10 May 1944; Athens, Georgia, United States	1936	
	Irma Schweitzer-Meyer	20 January 1882; Baden, Aargau, Switzerland	4 July 1967; Zürich, Switzerland	1936, 1937	Nominated by Nils August Nilsson.
1937
	Henrietta Szold	21 December 1860; Baltimore, Maryland, United States	13 February 1945; Jerusalem, Israel	1937	Nominated by Royal S. Copeland.
1938
	Princess Henriette of Belgium	30 November 1870; Brussels, Belgium	28 March 1948; Sierre, Valais, Switzerland	1938	
1939
	Carrie Chapman Catt	9 January 1859; Ripon, United States	9 March 1947; New Rochelle, New York, United States	1939	
1940
	Helene Stöcker	12 November 1869; Wuppertal, North Rhine-Westphalia, Germany	24 February 1943; New York City, United States	1940	Nominated with Théodore Ruyssen Ludwig Quidde.
1946
	Emily Greene Balch	8 January 1867; Boston, Massachusetts, United States	9 January 1961; Cambridge, Massachusetts, United States	1946	Awarded the 1946 Nobel Peace Prize, shared with John Raleigh Mott.
	Alexandra Kollontai	31 March 1872; Saint Petersburg, Russia	9 March 1952; Moscow, Russia	1946, 1947	
1947
	Eleanor Roosevelt	11 October 1884; New York City, United States	7 November 1962; Manhattan, New York, United States	1947, 1949, 1955, 1959, 1962	
1948
	Katharine Glasier	25 September 1867; Stoke Newington, London, England	14 June 1950; Earby, Lancashire, England	1948	Nominated by Gilbert McAllister.
1949
	María Eva Duarte Perón	7 May 1919; Los Toldos, Argentina	26 July 1952; Buenos Aires, Argentina	1949	Nominated jointly with Juan Perón; nominated by Virgilio Filippo.
	Maria Montessori	31 August 1870; Chiaravalle, Ancona, Italy	6 May 1952; Noordwijk, South Holland, Netherlands	1949, 1950, 1951	
1951
	Wilhelmina of the Netherlands	31 August 1880; The Hague, Netherlands	28 November 1962; Apeldoorn, Gelderland, Netherlands	1951	Queen of the Netherlands, reigned 1890–1948
1952
	Barbara Waylen	1906; England	1980; England	1952	Nominated by Norman Bentwich.
	Elisabeth Rotten	15 February 1882; Berlin, Germany	2 May 1964; London, England	1952, 1956, 1957, 1959, 1960, 1961	
1953
	Margaret Sanger	14 September 1879; Corning, New York, United States	6 September 1966; Tucson, Arizona, United States	1953, 1954, 1955, 1956, 1960, 1963	
1954
	Helen Keller	27 June 1880; Tuscumbia, Alabama, United States	1 June 1968; Easton, Connecticut, United States	1954, 1958	
1955
	Gertrud Baer	25 November 1890; Halberstadt, German Empire	15 December 1981; Geneva, Switzerland	1955, 1956, 1957, 1958, 1959	
1959
	Olave St. Clair Baden-Powell	22 February 1889; Chesterfield, Derbyshire, England	25 June 1977; Bramley, Surrey, England	1959	
1961
	Marie-Elisabeth Lüders	25 June 1878; Berlin, Germany	23 March 1966; Berlin, Germany	1961	Nominated by Erich Mende.
	Lotta Hitschmanova	28 November 1909; Prague, Czech Republic	1 August 1990; Ottawa, Canada	1961, 1962	Nominated by Arthur M. Smith(?) each time.
	Gertrud Kurz-Hohl	15 March 1890; Lutzenberg, Appenzell, Switzerland	26 June 1972; Lutzenberg, Appenzell, Switzerland	1961, 1962	
	Giulia Scappino Murena	1902; Ferrara, Italy	1982; Bologna, Italy	1961, 1962	Nominated by Udo Redano each time; also nominated for the Nobel Prize in Literature.
1962
	Maude Miner Hadden	29 June 1880; Leyden, Massachusetts, United States	14 April 1967; Palm Beach, Florida, United States	1962	Nominated by Åke Sandler.
1963
	Marie-Catherien Leblanc	30 December 1923; Montpellier, Hérault, France	—N/a	1963	
	Stella Monk	—N/a	—N/a	1963	Nominated by Mohamed Sahr Mustapha(?).
1967
	Sue Ryder Cheshire	3 July 1924; Leeds, West Yorkshire, England	2 November 2000; Bury St Edmunds, Suffolk, England	1967, 1968	
1969
	Kaoru Hatoyama	21 November 1888; Yokohama, Kanagawa, Japan	15 August 1982; Tokyo, Japan	1969	
1970
	Alva Reimer-Myrdal	31 January 1902; Uppsala, Sweden	1 February 1986; Stockholm, Sweden	1970, 1975, 1976	Awarded the 1982 Nobel Peace Prize, shared with Alfonso García Robles.
	Britta Holmström	8 April 1911; Linköping, Sweden	4 October 1992; Lund, Sweden	1970	
1971
	Louise Weiss	25 January 1893; Arras, Pas-de-Calais, France	26 May 1983; Paris, France	1971	Also nominated for Nobel Prize in Literature.
1972
	Mary Teresa Bojaxhiu	26 August 1910; Skopje, North Macedonia	5 September 1997; Kolkata, West Bengal, India	1972, 1974, 1975, 1976	Awarded the 1979 Nobel Peace Prize.
	Isabelle Grant	3 July 1896; Lossiemouth, Moray, Scotland	1 June 1977; London, England	1972	Nominated by Bizz Johnson.
	Elise Ottesen-Jensen	2 January 1886; Sandnes, Rogaland, Norway	4 September 1973; Stockholm, Sweden	1972	
	Annie Skau Berntsen	May 29, 1911; Oslo, Norway	November 26, 1992; Horten, Norway	1972	Nominated by Henrik Bahr.
	Helen Suzman	7 November 1917; Germiston, Transvaal, South Africa	1 January 2009; Johannesburg, Gauteng, South Africa	1972	Nominated by Richard Luyt.
1973
	Pearl S. Buck	26 June 1892; Hillsboro, West Virginia, United States	6 March 1973; Danby, Vermont, United States	1973	Awarded the 1938 Nobel Prize in Literature.
	Indira Gandhi	19 November 1917; Allahabad, Uttar Pradesh, India	31 October 1984; New Delhi, India	1973	Nominated by Buddha Priya Maurya. 3rd Prime Minister of India (1966–1977, 1980–1984)
	Jeannette Rankin	11 June 1880; Missoula, Montana, United States	18 May 1973; Carmel, California, United States	1973	Nominated by Mike Mansfield; died before the prize was awarded.
1974
	Hiltgunt Margret Zassenhaus	10 July 1916; Hamburg, Germany	20 November 2004; Baltimore, Maryland, United States	1974	
	Conchita Cuchí Coll de Carlo	1 September 1907; Santurce, San Juan, Puerto Rico	March 1981; San Juan, Puerto Rico	1974, 1976	
	Jeanne DeFrance Streit	4 November 1899; Lille, Nord, France	18 October 2000; Stamford, Connecticut, United States	1974, 1975, 1976	Nominated jointly with Clarence Streit each time.
1976
	Sirimavo Bandaranaike	17 April 1916; Ratnapura, British Ceylon	10 October 2000; Kadawatha, Sri Lanka	1976	Nominated by Maithripala Senanayake (1916–1998) the only time. Prime Minister of Sri Lanka (1960–1965, 1970–1977, 1994–2000)
	Hualing Nieh Engle	11 January 1925; Wuhan, Hubei, China	21 October 2024; Iowa City, Iowa, United States	1976	Nominated jointly with Paul Engle (1908–1991) the only time.
	Jacqueline Lee Kennedy	July 28, 1929; Southampton, New York, United States	May 19, 1994; New York City, United States	1976	
	Isabel Perón	4 February 1931; La Rioja, Argentina	(aged 95)	1976	Nominated by Decio B. Naranjo (?) the only time. 41st President of Argentina (1974–1976)
Others
1977
	Betty Williams	22 May 1943; Belfast, Northern Ireland	17 March 2020; Belfast, Northern Ireland	1977	Awarded the 1976 Nobel Peace Prize in 1977.
	Mairead Maguire	27 January 1944; Belfast, Northern Ireland	(aged 82)	1977	Awarded the 1976 Nobel Peace Prize in 1977.
1978
	Imelda Romualdez-Marcos	2 July 1929; San Miguel, Manila, Philippines	(aged 97)	1978	
	Dorothy Day	8 November 1897; Brooklyn Heights, New York, United States	29 November 1980; Manhattan, New York, United States	1978, 1979	
1979
	Doris Twitchell Allen	8 October 1901; Old Town, Maine, United States	7 March 2002; Sterling, Virginia, United States	1979	
	Hildegard Goss-Mayr	22 January 1930; Vienna, Austria	(aged 96)	1979, 1987, 2005 (Note: "As part of the 1000 PeaceWomen Across the Globe)	
1981
	Geraldyn "Jerrie" Cobb	5 March 1931; Norman, Oklahoma, United States	18 March 2019; Cape Canaveral, Florida, United States	1981	
	Helen Foster Snow	21 September 1907; Cedar City, Utah, United States	11 January 1997; Guilford, Connecticut, United States	1981, 1982	
1984
	Patricia Montandon	26 December 1928; Merkel, Texas, United States	(aged 97)	1984, 1985, 1986	
1986
	Harriet Drury Van Meter	27 December 1910; Fulton, Illinois, United States	12 October 1997; Lexington, Kentucky, United States	1986	
	Winnie Madikizela-Mandela	26 September 1936; Mbhongweni, Eastern Cape, South Africa	2 April 2018; Johannesburg, South Africa	1986, 1988	
1987
	Corazon Cojuangco-Aquino	25 January 1933; Paniqui, Tarlac, Philippines	1 August 2009; Makati, Philippines	1987, 1988, 1989	11 President of the Philippines, served 1986–1992
1988
	Gro Harlem Brundtland	20 April 1939; Bærum, Akershus, Norway	(aged 87)	1988	Prime Minister of Norway served 1981, 1986–1989, 1990–1996
	Emmanuelle Cinquin	16 November 1908; Brussels, Belgium	20 October 2008; Callian, Var, France	1988	
	Ruth Pfau	9 September 1929; Leipzig, Saxony, Germany	10 August 2017; Karachi, Sindh, Pakistan	1988	
	Inga Thorsson	3 July 1915 in Malmö, Sweden	15 January 1994 in Stockholm, Sweden	1988	
	Scilla Elworthy	3 June 1943; Galashiels, Scotland	(aged 83)	1988, 1989, 1991	
	Dulce de Souza Pontes	26 May 1914; Salvador, Bahia, Brazil	13 March 1992; Salvador, Bahia, Brazil	1988, 1992	
1989
	Aung San Suu Kyi	19 June 1945; Yangon, Myanmar	(aged 81)	1989, 1990, 1991	Awarded the 1991 Nobel Peace Prize.
1990
	Anne, Princess Royal	15 August 1950; London, England	(aged 76)	1990	
	Chai Ling	15 April 1966; Rizhao, Shandong, China	(aged 60)	1990	
	Elise M. Boulding	6 July 1920; Oslo, Norway	24 June 2010; Needham, Massachusetts, United States	1990, 2005	
1992
	Rigoberta Menchú	9 January 1959; Laj Chimel, Uspantán, El Quiché, Guatemala	(aged 67)	1992	Awarded the 1992 Nobel Peace Prize.
	Elisa Molina de Stahl	24 March 1918; Quetzaltenango, Guatemala	3 November 1996; Guatemala City, Guatemala	1992	
	Shulamit Katznelson	17 August 1919; Geneva, Switzerland	6 August 1999; Netanya, Israel	1992, 1993	
1995
	Toshi Akamatsu-Maruki	11 February 1912; Chippubetsu, Hokkaido, Japan	13 January 2000; Moroyama, Saitama, Japan	1995	
	Agni Vlavianos Arvanitis	9 March 1936; Athens, Greece	7 April 2018; Athens, Greece	1995	
	Leyla Zana	3 May 1961; Silvan, Diyarbakır, Türkiye	(aged 65)	1995, 1998, 2013	
1996
	Heather Mills	12 January 1968; Aldershot, Hampshire, England	(aged 58)	1996	
	Nirmala Srivastava	21 March 1923; Chhindwara, Madhya Pradesh, India	23 February 2011; Genoa, Italy	1996	
1997
	Jody Williams	9 October 1950; Rutland, Vermont, United States	(aged 76)	1997	Awarded the 1997 Nobel Peace Prize, shared with the International Campaign to Ban Landmines.
	Vesna Teršelič	1962; Ljubljana, Slovenia	(aged 64)	1997	
1998
	Jane Hamilton-Merritt	5 February 1935; Hamilton, Indiana, United States	(aged 91)	1998, 2000	
1999
	Helen Prejean	21 April 1939; Baton Rouge, Louisiana, United States	(aged 87)	1999	
	Catherine Hamlin	24 January 1924; Sydney, Australia	18 March 2020; Addis Ababa, Ethiopia	1999, 2014	
2000
	Kathy Kelly	10 December 1952; Chicago, Illinois, United States	(aged 73)	2000	
2001
	Elisabeth Mann Borgese	24 April 1918; Munich, Bavaria, Germany	8 February 2002; St. Moritz, Grisons, Switzerland	2001	
2002
	Maria Pearson	12 July 1932; Springfield, South Dakota, United States	23 May 2003; Ames, Iowa, United States	2002	
	Esma Redžepova	8 August 1943; Skopje, North Macedonia	11 December 2016; Skopje, North Macedonia	2002, 2004	
	Carla Del Ponte	9 February 1947; Lugano, Ticino, Switzerland	(aged 79)	2002, 2006	
2003
	Shirin Ebadi	21 June 1947; Hamadan, Iran	(aged 79)	2003	Awarded the 2003 Nobel Peace Prize.
	Ding Zilin	20 December 1936; Shanghai, China	(aged 89)	2003	
	Lois Gibbs	25 June 1951; Grand Island, New York, United States	(aged 75)	2003	
	Irena Sendlerowa	15 February 1910; Warsaw, Poland	12 May 2008; Warsaw, Poland	2003, 2007	
2004
	Wangarĩ Maathai	1 April 1940; Tetu, Nyeri, Kenya	25 September 2011; Nairobi, Kenya	2004	Awarded the 2004 Nobel Peace Prize.
	Nelsa Curbelo	1 November 1941; Montevideo, Uruguay	(aged 85)	2004, 2009	
	Íngrid Betancourt	25 December 1961; Bogotá, Colombia	(aged 64)	2004, 2008, 2009, 2010	
2005
	1000 PeaceWomen Across the Globe	a collective nomination of 1000 women from over 150 different countries for the 2005 Nobel Peace Prize.		2005	
	Taslima Nasrin	25 August 1962; Mymensingh, Bangladesh	(aged 64)	2005	
	Birubala Rabha	1954; Goalpara, Assam, India	13 May 2024; Guwahati, Assam, India	2005	
	Zilda Arns Neumann	25 August 1934; Forquilhinha, Santa Catarina, Brazil	12 January 2010; Port-au-Prince, Haiti	2005, 2006	
	Yvonne Lime Feddersen	7 April 1935; Glendale, California, United States	(aged 91)	2005, 2006, 2007, 2008, 2009	Nominated jointly each time.
	Sara O'Meara	9 September 1934; Knoxville, Tennessee, United States	(aged 92)	2005, 2006, 2007, 2008, 2009	Nominated jointly each time.
	Betty Reardon	12 June 1929; Rye, New York, United States	3 November 2023; Cambridge, Massachusetts, United States	2005, 2013	
	Meaza Ashenafi	25 July 1964; Asosa, Ethiopia	(aged 62)	2005, 2015	
	Medea Benjamin	10 September 1952; Freeport, New York, United States	(aged 74)	2005, 2015, 2016, 2017	
2006
	Ayaan Hirsi Ali	13 November 1969; Mogadishu, Somalia	(aged 57)	2006	
	Rebiya Kadeer	15 November 1946; Altay City, Xinjiang, China	(aged 80)	2006, 2007, 2010	
	Lidia Yusupova	15 September 1961; Grozny, Chechnya, Russia	(aged 65)	2006, 2007, 2008, 2009	
	Natty Hollmann	July 1939; Bahía Blanca, Buenos Aires, United States	26 July 2021; Bahía Blanca, Buenos Aires, United States	2006, 2009, 2012	
2007
	Marta Beatriz Roque	16 May 1945; Havana, Cuba	(aged 81)	2007	
	Sheila Watt-Cloutier	2 December 1953; Kuujjuaq, Quebec, Canada	(aged 72)	2007	
	Oprah Winfrey	29 January 1954; Kosciusko, Mississippi, United States	(aged 72)	2007	
	Patricia Mónica Pérez	14 July 1962; Buenos Aires, Argentina	(aged 64)	2007, 2008, 2009, 2010, 2011, 2012, 2013, 2014, 2015	
2008
	Inge Genefke	6 July 1938; Frederiksberg, Denmark	—N/a	2008, 2009, 2011, 2013	
	Aminatou Haidar	24 July 1966; Laayoune, Western Sahara	(aged 60)	2008, 2021	
2009
	Piedad Córdoba	25 January 1955; Medellín, Colombia	20 January 2024; Medellín, Colombia	2009	
	Sima Samar	3 February 1957; Jaghori, Gazni, Afghanistan	(aged 69)	2009, 2010, 2011	
	Hawa Abdi	17 May 1947; Mogadishu, Somalia	5 August 2020; Mogadishu, Somalia	2009, 2012	
2010
	Zura Karuhimbi	c. 1925; Gitarama, Muhanga, Rwanda	17 December 2018; Musamo, Ruhango, Rwanda	2010, 2011	
	Yolande Mukagasana	6 September 1954; Butare, Huye, Rwanda	(aged 72)	2010, 2011	
	Svetlana Gannushkina	6 March 1942; Moscow, Russia	(aged 84)	2010, 2011, 2012, 2013, 2016, 2018	
2011
	Ellen Johnson Sirleaf	29 October 1938; Monrovia, Liberia	(aged 88)	2011	24th President of Liberia (2006–2018) Awarded jointly the 2011 Nobel Peace Prize.
	Leymah Gbowee	1 February 1972; Monrovia, Liberia	(aged 54)	2011	24th President of Liberia (2006–2018) Awarded jointly the 2011 Nobel Peace Prize.
	Tawakkol Karman	7 February 1979; Shara'b As Salam, Taiz, Yemen	(aged 47)	2011	24th President of Liberia (2006–2018) Awarded jointly the 2011 Nobel Peace Prize.
	Ksenija Dumičić	Zagreb, Croatia	—N/a	2011	
	Israa Abdel Fattah	1978; Benha, Qalyubiyya, Egypt	(aged 48)	2011	
	Lina Ben Mhenni	22 May 1983; Tunis, Tunisia	27 January 2020; Tunis, Tunisia	2011	
	Roza Otunbayeva	23 August 1950; Bishkek, Kyrgyzstan	(aged 76)	2011, 2012	3rd President of Kyrgyzstan (2010–2011)
2012
	Nasrin Sotoudeh	30 May 1963; Langarud, Gilan, Iran	(aged 63)	2012	
	Yulia Tymoshenko	27 November 1960; Dnipro, Ukraine	(aged 65)	2012	Prime Minister of Ukraine, served 2005, 2007–2010
	Angie Zelter	5 June 1951; London, England	(aged 75)	2012	
	Lyudmila Alexeyeva	20 July 1927; Yevpatoria, Ukraine	8 December 2018; Moscow, Russia	2012, 2013	
	Alaa Murabit	26 October 1989; Saskatoon, Saskatchewan, Canada	(aged 37)	2012, 2017	
	Maggie Gobran	1949; Cairo, Egypt	(aged 77)	2012, 2014, 2020, 2023	
2013
	Malala Yousafzai	12 July 1997; Mingora, Swat, Pakistan	(aged 29)	2013, 2014	Awarded the 2014 Nobel Peace Prize, shared with Kailash Satyarthi.
	Claudia Paz y Paz	7 June 1966; Guatemala City, Guatemala	(aged 60)	2013	
	Lilia Shibanova	13 October 1953; Voronezh, Russia	(aged 73)	2013	
	Susana Trimarco	25 May 1954; San Miguel de Tucumán, Argentina	(aged 72)	2013	
2014
	Agnes Mariam Laham	23 December 1951; Beirut, Lebanon	(aged 74)	2014	
	Catherine Ashton	25 March 1956; Up Holland, West Lancashire, England	(aged 70)	2014	
	Anne Merriman	13 May 1935; Liverpool, England	18 May 2025; Kampala, Uganda	2014	
2015
	Zainab Bangura	18 December 1959; Yonibana, Tonkolili, Sierra Leone	(aged 66)	2015	
	Kathryn Bolkovac	c. 1960; Ohio, United States	(aged 66)	2015	
	Aminetou Mint El-Moctar	13 December 1956; Nouakchott, Mauritania	(aged 69)	2015	
	Queen Sofía of Spain	2 November 1938; Psychiko, Greece	(aged 87)	2015	Queen consort of Spain, reigned 1975–2024
	Setsuko Thurlow	3 January 1932; Hiroshima, Japan	(aged 94)	2015	
	Leyla Yunus	21 December 1955; Baku, Azerbaijan	(aged 70)	2015	
	Jeanne Nacatche Banyere	Democratic Republic of Congo	—N/a	2015, 2016	Nominated jointly each time.
	Jeannette Kahindo Bindu	Democratic Republic of Congo	—N/a	2015, 2016	Nominated jointly each time.
	Angela Merkel	17 July 1954; Hamburg, Germany	(aged 72)	2015, 2016	Chancellor of Germany, served 2005–2021
	Federica Mogherini	16 June 1973; Rome, Italy	(aged 53)	2015, 2017	
	Evelin Lindner	13 May 1954; Hameln, Lower Saxony, Germany	(aged 72)	2015, 2016, 2017	
2016
	Nadia Murad	10 March 1993; Kocho, Iraq	(aged 33)	2016, 2017, 2018	Awarded the 2018 Nobel Peace Prize, shared with Denis Mukwege.
	Jineth Bedoya Lima	21 October 1974; Ibagué, Tolima, Colombia	(aged 52)	2016	
	Luz Marina Bernal	1960; Soacha, Cundinamarca, Colombia	(aged 66)	2016	
	Emilia Kamvysi	c. 1930; Lesbos, Greece	12 March 2023; Lesbos, Greece	2016	
	Fatma Şahin	20 June 1966; Gaziantep, Türkiye	(aged 60)	2016	
	Susan Sarandon	4 October 1946; Jackson Heights, New York, United States	(aged 80)	2016	
	Constanza Turbay	Colombia	—N/a	2016	
2017
	Maria da Penha	1 February 1945; Fortaleza, Ceará, Brazil	(aged 81)	2017	
	Olga Sadovskaya	25 October 1980; Nizhny Novgorod, Russia	(aged 46)	2017, 2018	
	Marianne Stöger	24 April 1934; Matrei am Brenner, Tyrol, Austria	(aged 92)	2017, 2020	Nominated jointly each time.
	Margaritha Pissarek	9 June 1935; Austria	29 September 2023; Austria	2017, 2020	Nominated jointly each time.
2018
	Anna Alboth	1984; Warsaw, Poland	(aged 42)	2018	
	Tarana Burke	12 September 1973; New York City, United States	(aged 53)	2018	
	Lidija Doroņina-Lasmane	28 July 1925; Ulmale, Aizpute, Latvia	(aged 101)	2018	
	Jaha Dukureh	1989; Gambia	(aged 37)	2018	
	Oby Ezekwesili	28 April 1963; Ukpor, Anambra, Nigeria	(aged 63)	2018	
	Latifa Ibn Ziaten	1 January 1960; Tétouan, Morocco	(aged 66)	2018	
	Elena Milashina	28 October 1977; Dalnegorsk, Primorsky Krai, Russia	(aged 49)	2018	
	Nataša Kandić	16 December 1946; Belgrade, Serbia	(aged 79)	2018, 2023	
	Agnes Chow	3 December 1996; Hong Kong	(aged 29)	2018, 2019, 2021, 2022, 2023	
2019
	Amanda Nguyen	10 October 1991; Corona, California, United States	(aged 35)	2019	
	Rosa María [Orozco] de la Garza	6 July 1960; Mexico City, Mexico	(aged 66)	2019	
	Yvonne Ridley	23 April 1958; Stanley, County Durham, England	(aged 68)	2019	
	Sevgül Uludağ	15 October 1958; Nicosia, Cyprus	(aged 68)	2019	
	Loujain al-Hathloul	31 July 1989; Jeddah, Saudi Arabia	(aged 37)	2019, 2020	
	Jacinda Ardern	26 July 1980; Hamilton, New Zealand	(aged 46)	2019, 2020	40th Prime Minister of New Zealand, served 2017–2023
	Ilwad Elman	22 December 1989; Mogadishu, Somalia	(aged 36)	2019, 2020	
	Hajer Sharief	1994; Libya	(aged 32)	2019, 2020	
	Greta Thunberg	3 January 2003; Stockholm, Sweden	(aged 23)	2019, 2020, 2021, 2022, 2023, 2026	
2020
	Nassima al-Sadah	13 August 1974; Qatif, Saudi Arabia	(aged 52)	2020	
	Sally Becker	29 March 1962; London, England	(aged 64)	2020	
	Leila de Lima	27 August 1959; Iriga, Camarines Sur, Philippines	(aged 67)	2020	
	Fawzia Koofi	1975; Darwaz, Badakhshan, Afganistan	(aged 51)	2020	
	Olga Romanova	28 March 1966; Lyubertsy, Moscow, Russia	(aged 60)	2020	
2021
	Maria Ressa	2 October 1963; Manila, Philippines	(aged 63)	2021	Awarded the 2021 Nobel Peace Prize, shared with Dmitry Muratov.
	Stacey Abrams	9 December 1973; Madison, Wisconsin, United States	(aged 52)	2021	
	Zineb El Rhazoui	19 January 1982; Casablanca, Morocco	(aged 44)	2021	
	Patricia Espinosa	21 October 1958; Mexico City, Mexico	(aged 68)	2021	
	Jane Goodall	3 April 1934; Hampstead, London, England	1 October 2025; Los Angeles, California, United States	2021	
	Veronika Tsepkalo	7 September 1976; Mogilev, Belarus	(aged 50)	2021	
	Maria Kalesnikava	24 April 1982; Minsk, Belarus	(aged 44)	2021	
	Juliana Taimoorazy	23 April 1973; Tehran, Iran	(aged 53)	2021	
	Marilyn Waring	7 October 1952; Ngaruawahia, New Zealand	(aged 74)	2021	
	Alexandra Wong	16 May 1956; Sham Shui Po, Hong Kong	(aged 70)	2021	
	Sviatlana Tsikhanouskaya	11 September 1982; Mikashevichy, Belarus	(aged 44)	2021, 2022	
2022
	Maria Elena Bottazzi	1966; Genoa, Italy	(aged 60)	2022	
	Hope A. Cristobal	14 December 1946; Guam	(aged 79)	2022	
	Dee Dawkins-Haigler	31 January 1970; Lithonia, Georgia, United States	(aged 56)	2022	
	Opal Lee	7 October 1926; Marshall, Texas, United States	(aged 100)	2022	
	Shruti Nagvanshi-Raghuvanshi	2 January 1974; Varanasi, Uttar Pradesh, India	(aged 52)	2022	
	Miriam Were	12 April 1940; Kakamega, Western Province, Kenya	(aged 86)	2022	
	Masih Alinejad	11 September 1976; Qomi Kola, Iran	(aged 50)	2022, 2023	
	Gwyneth Ho	24 August 1990; Hong Kong	(aged 36)	2022, 2023, 2024	
	Chow Hang-tung	24 January 1985; Hong Kong	(aged 41)	2022, 2023, 2024, 2025	
2023
	Narges Mohammadi	21 April 1972; Zanjan, Iran	(aged 54)	2023	Awarded the 2023 Nobel Peace Prize.
	Liseby Elysé	24 July 1953; Peros Banhos, Mauritius	(aged 73)	2023	
	Silvia Foti	1961; Chicago, Illinois, United States	(aged 65)	2023	
	Kumudini Gupta	India	—N/a	2023	
	Denise Ho	10 May 1977; Hong Kong	(aged 49)	2023	
	Li Kangmeng	25 September 1997; China	(aged 29)	2023	
	Vanessa Nakate	15 November 1996; Kampala, Uganda	(aged 30)	2023	
	Margaret Ng	25 January 1948; Tai Wai, Sha Tin, Hong Kong	(aged 78)	2023	
	Mahbouba Seraj	1948; Kabul, Afghanistan	(aged 78)	2023	
	Jani Silva	c. 1968; Colombia	(aged 58)	2023	
	Victoria Tauli-Corpuz	19 October 1952; Besao, Mt. Province, Philippines	(aged 74)	2023	
	Zhang Zhan	2 September 1983; Xianyang, Shaanxi, China	(aged 43)	2023	
2024
	Yasmina Cánovas	Barcelona, Spain	—N/a	2024	
	Hind Khoudary	28 June 1995; Gaza City, Palestine	(aged 31)	2024	
	Heidi Kühn	1958; San Rafael, California, United States	(aged 68)	2024	
	Bisan Owda	11 February 1997; Beit Hanoun, North Gaza, Palestine	(aged 29)	2024	
2025
	María Corina Machado	7 October 1967; Caracas, Venezuela	(aged 59)	2025	Awarded the 2025 Nobel Peace Prize.
	Mahrang Baloch	3 February 1993; Kalat, Balochistan, Pakistan	(aged 33)	2025	
	Jolanta Duda	Poland	—N/a	2025	
	Îlham Ehmed	1967 Afrin, Aleppo, Syria	(aged 59)	2025	
	Elizaveta Gyrdymova (a.k.a. Monetochka)	1 June 1998; Yekaterinburg, Russia	(aged 28)	2025	
	Huang Xueqin	1988; Shaoguan, Guangdong, China	(aged 38)	2025	
	Yulia Navalnaya	24 July 1976; Moscow, Russia	(aged 50)	2025	
	Zuriel Oduwole	July 2002; Los Angeles, California, United States	(aged 24)	2025	
	Gisèle Pelicot	7 December 1952; Villingen-Schwenningen, Baden-Württemberg, Germany	(aged 73)	2025	
	Cheryl Perera	1986; Richmond Hill, Ontario, Canada	(aged 40)	2025	
	Hind Rajab	3 May 2018; Gaza City, Palestine	29 January 2024; Tel al-Hawa, Gaza City, Palestine	2025	Nominated posthumously.
	Feride Rushiti	12 September 1970; Gjilan, Kosovo	(aged 56)	2025	
	Daniella Weiss	30 August 1945; Bnei Brak, Tel Aviv, Israel	(aged 81)	2025	
	Francesca Albanese	30 March 1977; Ariano Irpino, Avellino, Italy	(aged 49)	2025, 2026	
2026
	Sara Al-Saqqa	18 February 1992	(aged 34)	2026	
	Maia Sandu	24 May 1972; Risipeni, Fălești, Moldova	(aged 54)	2026	

== Economic Sciences ==
From 1969 to 1971, 3 women have been nominated for the Nobel Memorial Prize in Economic Sciences but none of them were subsequently awarded.

Picture	Name	Born	Died	Years Nominated	Notes
1969
	Anna Schwartz	11 November 1915; The Bronx, New York, United States	21 June 2012; Manhattan, New York, United States	1969, 1971	Nominated by Bertil Gotthard Ohlin.
	Joan Robinson	31 October 1903; Surrey, United Kingdom	5 August 1983; Cambridge, United Kingdom	1969, 1970, 1971	
1971
	Barbara Bergmann	20 July 1927; The Bronx, New York, United States	5 April 2015; Bethesda, Maryland, United States	1971	
1972–1974
should be revealed by Nobel Committee
Others
2009
	Elinor Ostrom	7 August 1933; Los Angeles, California, United States	12 June 2012; Bloomington, Indiana, United States	2009	Awarded the 2009 Nobel Memorial Prize in Economic Sciences, shared with Oliver E. Williamson.
2010
	Janet Yellen	19 August 1946; Brooklyn, New York, United States	(aged 80)	2010, 2011	
2011
	Anne Osborn Krueger	12 February 1934; Endicott, New York, United States	(aged 92)	2011	
2019
	Esther Duflo	25 October 1972; Paris, France	(aged 54)	2019	Awarded the 2019 Nobel Memorial Prize in Economic Sciences, shared with Abhijit Banerjee and Michael Kremer.
	Katarina Juselius	25 September 1943; Turku, Finland	(aged 83)	2019	
2020
	Claudia Goldin	14 May 1946; New York City, New York, United States	(aged 80)	2020, 2023	Awarded the 2023 Nobel Memorial Prize in Economic Sciences.
2021
	Carmen Reinhart	7 October 1955; Havana, Cuba	(aged 71)	2021	
2024
	Susan Athey	24 November 1970; Boston, Massachusetts, United States	(aged 55)	2024, 2025	
	Janet Currie	29 March 1960; Kingston, Ontario, Canada	(aged 66)	2024	
2025
	Marianne Bertrand	1970; Brussels, Belgium	(aged 56)	2025	
	Monika Schnitzer	9 September 1961; Mannheim, Baden-Württemberg, West Germany	(aged 65)	2025	

== See also ==
- List of Nobel laureates
- List of female Nobel laureates
- List of women writers
- List of women's rights activists
- List of female scientists in the 20th century
- Matilda effect
