= List of nominees for the Nobel Prize in Physiology or Medicine (1901–1999) =

The following is a list of lists of nominees for the Nobel Prize in Physiology or Medicine for the years in which such data has been publicly released. The Nobel Prize in Physiology or Medicine (Swedish: Nobelpriset i fysiologi eller medicin) is awarded annually by the Nobel Assembly at the Karolinska Institute to scientists who have made outstanding contributions in physiology or medicine. It is one of the five Nobel Prizes which were established by the will of Alfred Nobel in 1895.

Every year, the Nobel Committee for Physiology or Medicine sends out forms, which amount to a personal and exclusive invitation, to about three thousand selected individuals to invite them to submit nominations. The names of the nominees are never publicly announced, and neither are they told that they have been considered for the Prize. Nomination records are strictly sealed for fifty years. However, the nominations for the years 1901 to 1953 are publicly available. Despite the annual sending of invitations, the prize was not awarded in nine years (1915–1918, 1921, 1925, 1940–1942) and has been delayed for a year five times (1919, 1922, 1926, 1938, 1943).

From 1901 to 1953, 935 scientists were nominated for the prize, 63 of which were awarded either jointly or individually. 19 more scientists from these nominees were awarded after 1953. Of the 13 women nominees, only G.Th.Cori was awarded the prize. Besides some scientists from these nominees won the prizes in other fields (including years after 1953): J.Boyd Orr - Peace Prize (1949); L.C.Pauling twice - in Chemistry (1954) and Peace Prize (1962); 3 - in Physics and 20 - in Chemistry (including Fr.Sanger twice - in 1958 and 1980).

In addition, nominations of 65 scientists (including one woman) were declared invalid by the Nobel Committee.

== Nominees by their first nomination ==
- List of nominees for the Nobel Prize in Physiology or Medicine (1901–1909)
- List of nominees for the Nobel Prize in Physiology or Medicine (1910–1919)
- List of nominees for the Nobel Prize in Physiology or Medicine (1920–1929)
- List of nominees for the Nobel Prize in Physiology or Medicine (1930–1939)
- List of nominees for the Nobel Prize in Physiology or Medicine (1940–1949)
- List of nominees for the Nobel Prize in Physiology or Medicine (1950–1959)

== See also ==
- List of Nobel laureates in Physiology or Medicine
- List of nominees for the Nobel Prize in Physics
- List of female nominees for the Nobel Prize
