= Joan Folkes =

British scientist (1927–2020)

Joan Phyllis Folkes (1927 – 10 April 2020) was a British scientist who was nominated for the Nobel Prize in chemistry in 1956. Along with Ernest Gale, she demonstrated that nucleic acids have an organizing or controlling role in protein synthesis. In his 2005 book, Hans-Jörg Rheinberger discussed the work of Folkes and Gale and how they revealed a connection between the levels of nucleic acids in cells and the rate that proteins were made.

Folkes and Gale were also the first to demonstrate cell-free protein production in a crude cell extract. During this work, they broke open cells of Staphylococcus aureus by vibration and the demonstrated that a template chemical existed, now recognized as DNA, that enables the production of proteins even in the absence of living cells. At the time, they called the chemical 'incorporation factors' because they were fragments of nucleic acids that encouraged amino acids to form into proteins.

== Career ==
Folkes worked at the Medical Research Council Unit of Chemical Microbiology in Cambridge, England.

== Personal life and death ==
In 1967, Folkes married Harold J. Tew in Cambridge. She died in Hampshire on 10 April 2020.

== Selected publications ==
- Gale, E. F.; Folkes, Joan P. (1 April 1955). "The assimilation of amino acids by bacteria. 20. The incorporation of labelled amino acids by disrupted staphylococcal cells". Biochemical Journal. 59 (4): 661–675. doi:10.1042/bj0590661. ISSN 0306-3283. PMC 1215633. PMID 14363162.
- Gale, E. F.; Folkes, Joan P. (1 April 1955). "The assimilation of amino acids by bacteria. 21. The effect of nucleic acids on the development of certain enzymic activities in disrupted staphylococcal cells". Biochemical Journal. 59 (4): 675–684. doi:10.1042/bj0590675. ISSN 0306-3283. PMC 1215634. PMID 14363163.
- Gale, Ernest F.; Folkes, Joan P. (1955). "Promotion of Incorporation of Amino-acids by Specific Di- and Tri-nucleotides". Nature. 175 (4457): 592–593. Bibcode:1955Natur.175..592G. doi:10.1038/175592a0. ISSN 0028-0836. PMID 14370172. S2CID 4225659.
- Gale, E. F.; Shepherd, C. J.; Folkes, Joan P. (1958). "Incorporation of Amino-Acids by Disrupted Staphylococcal Cells". Nature. 182 (4635): 592–595. Bibcode:1958Natur.182..592G. doi:10.1038/182592a0. ISSN 0028-0836. PMID 13577915. S2CID 4155672.
