= Émilie Lerou =

French actress

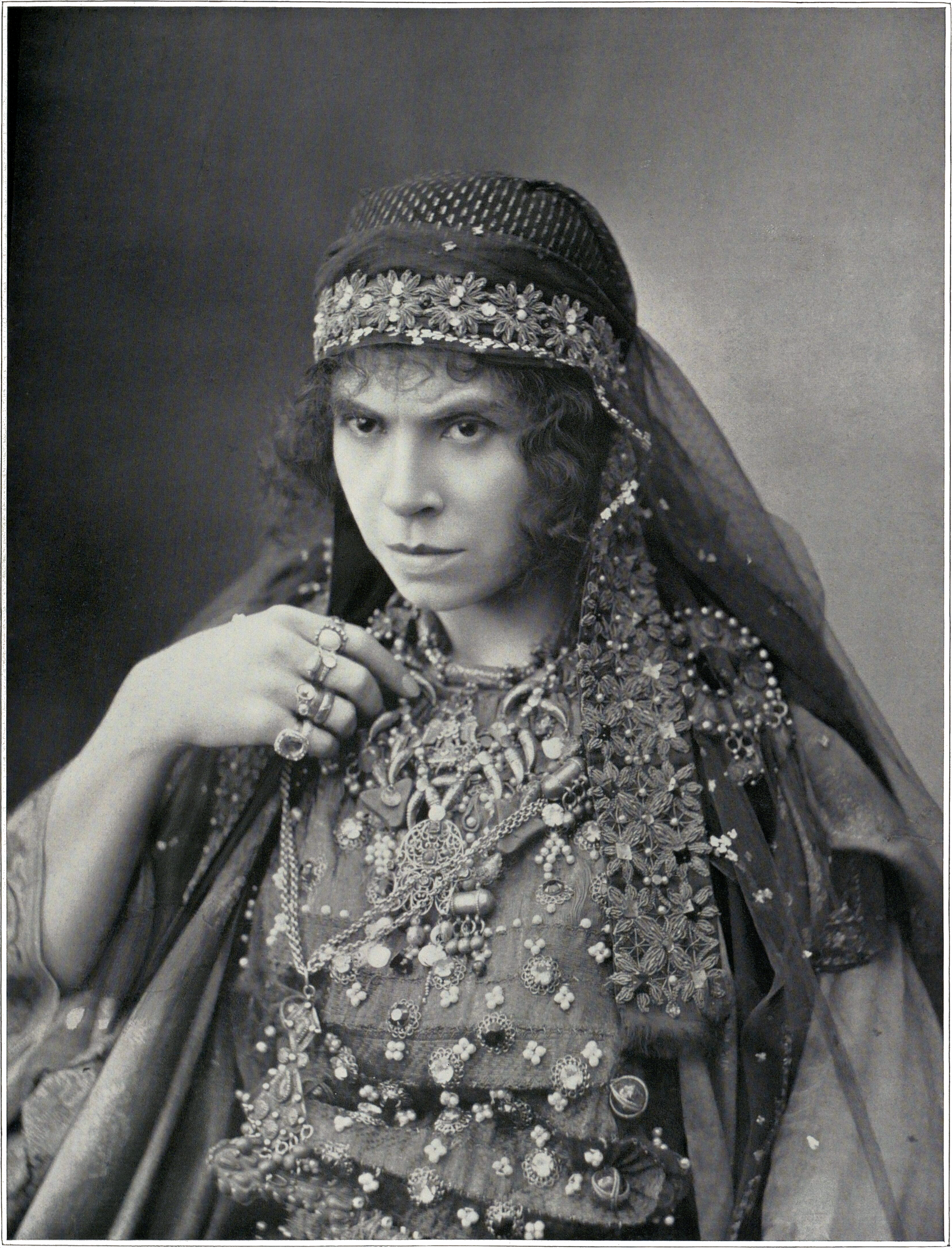
- Born: Marie-Émilie Lerou; 10 April 1855; Penne-d'Agenais, Lot-et-Garonne, Second French Empire
- Died: 10 February 1935 (aged 79); Valence d'Agen, Tarn-et-Garonne, French Third Republic
- Other name: Pierre Nahor
- Occupations: Actress, novelist
- Parent(s): Martin Lerou and Hermine Bizot née Lerou

Émilie Lerou (10 April 1855 – 10 February 1935) was a French stage actress and writer who was nominated for the 1904 Nobel Prize in Literature.

== Biography ==
Leroux was born on 10 April 1855 to Martin Lerou and Hermine Bizot née Lerou. She became famous as a talented dramatic actress, receiving her acting training from Louis-Arsène Delaunay. Since 1880, she played at the Comédie-Française Théâtre, and then at the Odéon-Théâtre in Paris.

In 1903, under the pseudonym Pierre Nahor, she published the novel Hiésous ("Jesus") with a foreword by Marcel Schwob. The book, based on the Gospel of John, presents an unusual interpretation of the life of Jesus Christ, which led to mixed assessments by contemporaries. Hiésous subsequently received some attention in research on literary representations of Jesus' life. German theologian Albert Schweitzer recognized parts of the novel as an examination of Lerou's own "religious-philosophical ideas". The book locates Jesus in the realm of "legend and poetry", and the novel also stands in the tradition of "sentimal descriptions" of Jesus' life and environment, as were common around a hundred years before Lerou's own novel.

In 1908, she published a memoir entitled Sous le masque: Une vie au théâtre ("Under the Mask: Life in the Theater") which earned recognitions in literary circles. Over the next few decades, until shortly before her death, Lerou repeatedly changed and added to the text; a new edition of the work was published in 1935. She fictionalizes her life, with a young girl from Russia as the protagonist. The American novelist and medievalist Urban Tigner Holmes Jr. reviewed the book in 1937 as "an intimate picture of the French theater world as it existed before the Great War." He described the work as "lively and insightful" and recommended it as supplementary reading for college courses on modern theater.

Lerou died on 10 February 1935 in Valence d'Agen, Tarn-et-Garonne, France.

=== Nobel Prize in Literature ===
In 1904, Académie Française member Jules Claretie nominated her for the Nobel Prize in Literature citing Hiésous as the primary motivation. Together with Selma Lagerlöf, she was only the second woman to be proposed for such honor after Malwida von Meysenbug in 1901.

The Nobel Committee described her novel as "a weave of thaumaturgical, spiritualistic and homeopathic fantasies, mixed together and sprinkled with a small dose of Hindu theosophy" and "in terms of its ideological content, the work is a product of empty imagination."
