= Giovanna Giordano =

Italian writer and journalist

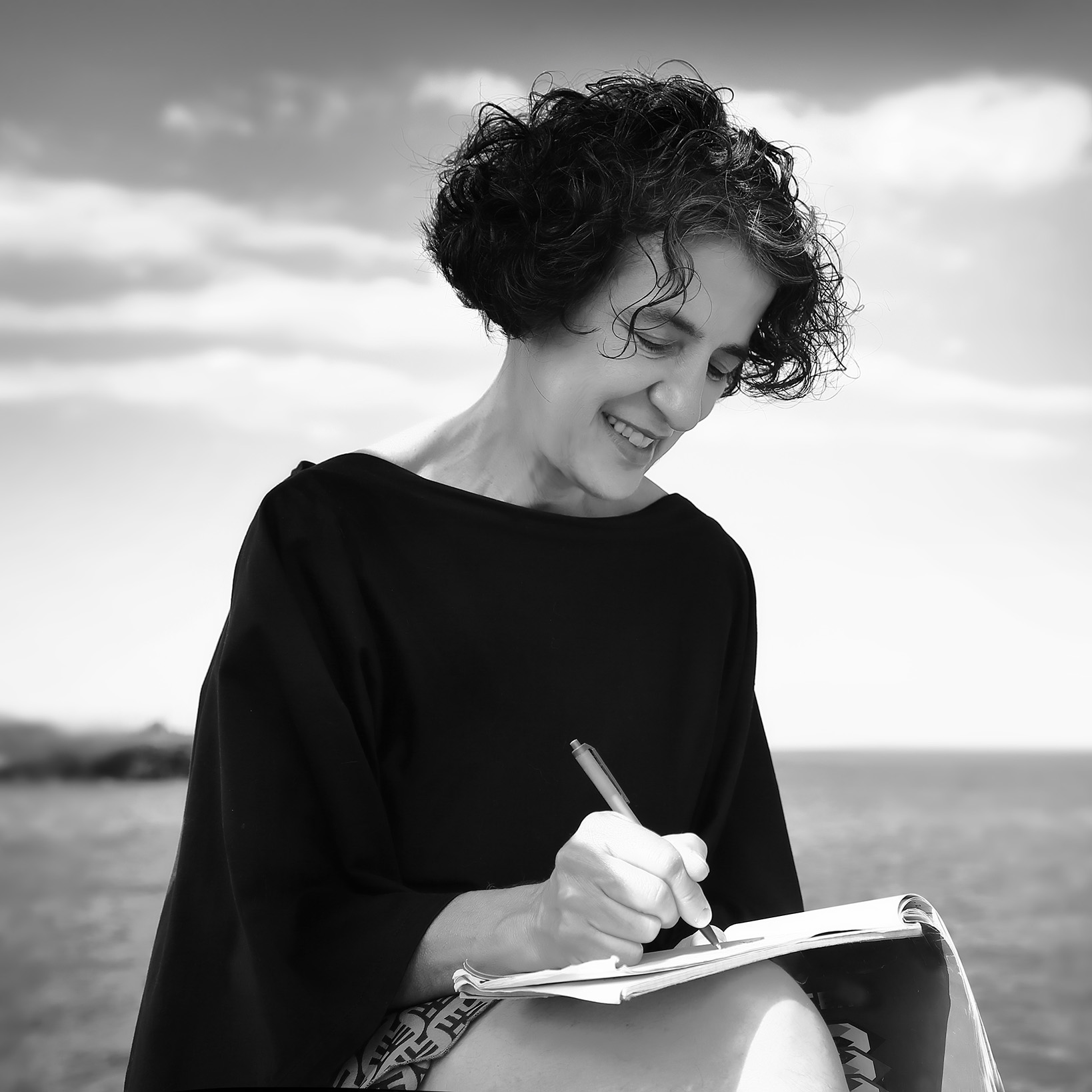
- Born: 12 November 1961 (age 64); Milan, Italy
- Occupation: Novelist
- Writing career
- Notable work: Un volo magico
- Notable awards: Premio Recalmare Sciascia (1996, 2004)

Giovanna Giordano (12 November 1961) is an Italian writer and journalist. She has three award-winning and critically acclaimed novels published to date: Trentaseimila giorni (Thirty-six Thousand Days), Un volo magico (A Magic Flight) and Il Mistero di Lithian (The Mystery of Lithian). Her first novel Cina cara io ti canto, unpublished, was a finalist for the fifth annual Premio Calvino, recommended by Gesualdo Bufalino.

== Life and career ==
Giovanna Giordano was born in Milan in 1961 and raised in Messina, the daughter of the scientist Nicola Giordano. She studied African Art History and teaches Philosophy and Phenomenology of the Image at the Academy of Fine Arts in Catania. As a journalist, she has written for La Stampa, Il Giornale di Sicilia, Il Mattino and currently for La Sicilia.

Her novel Un volo magico was published in German by the publishing Lübbe in 1999

Her novels Treintaseimila giorni and Il mistero di Lithian were winners of the Premio Racalmare Sciascia

All her novels are journeys from Sicily to other places outside of Italy.

=== Novels ===
- Trentaseimila giorni (1996) (Thirty-six Thousand Days) published by Marsilio
- Un volo magico (1998) (A Magic Flight) published by Marsilio
- Il mistero di Lithian (2004) (The Mystery of Lithian), published by Marsilio
- Il profumo della libertà (2021) (The scent of freedom), published by Mondadori, ISBN 9788804741343
