= Nobel Prize in Chemistry =

Annual prize awarded in the field of chemistry (from 1895)

- Awarded for: Outstanding contributions in chemistry
- Location: Stockholm, Sweden
- Presented by: Royal Swedish Academy of Sciences
- Reward: 12 million SEK (2026)
- First award: 1901
- Most recent recipients: Henri B. Kagan and Kenso Soai (2026)

Highlights
- Most awards: Frederick Sanger and Karl Barry Sharpless (2)
- Website: nobelprize.org/chemistry

The Nobel Prize in Chemistry (Note: Swedish: Nobelpriset i kemi) is awarded annually by the Royal Swedish Academy of Sciences to scientists in the various fields of chemistry. It is one of the five Nobel Prizes established by the will of Alfred Nobel in 1895, awarded for outstanding contributions in chemistry, physics, literature, peace, and physiology or medicine. This award is administered by the Nobel Foundation and awarded by the Royal Swedish Academy of Sciences on proposal of the Nobel Committee for Chemistry, which consists of five members elected by the academy. The award is presented in Stockholm at an annual ceremony on 10 December, the anniversary of Nobel's death.

The first Nobel Prize in Chemistry was awarded in 1901 to Jacobus Henricus van 't Hoff, of the Netherlands, "for his discovery of the laws of chemical dynamics and osmotic pressure in solutions". From 1901 to 2026, the award has been bestowed on a total of 202 individuals. Frederick Sanger and K. Barry Sharpless both won twice. The 2026 Nobel Prize in Chemistry was awarded to Henri B. Kagan and Kenso Soai "for the discovery of non-linear effects and autocatalysis in asymmetric organic synthesis". As of 2022, eight women had won the prize: Maria Skłodowska-Curie (1911), her daughter Irène Joliot-Curie (1935), Dorothy Hodgkin (1964), Ada Yonath (2009), Frances Arnold (2018), Emmanuelle Charpentier and Jennifer Doudna (2020), and Carolyn R. Bertozzi (2022). Maria Skłodowska-Curie also won the Nobel Prize in Physics in 1903, making her the only person to win in two different sciences.

== Background ==
Nobel stipulated in his last will and testament that his money be used to create a series of prizes for those who confer the "greatest benefit on mankind" in physics, chemistry, peace, physiology or medicine, and literature. Though Nobel wrote several wills during his lifetime, the last was written a little over a year before he died, and signed at the Swedish-Norwegian Club in Paris on November 27, 1895. Nobel bequeathed 94% of his total assets, kr 31,000,000 (US$198,000,000, €176,000,000 in 2016), to establish and endow the five Nobel Prizes. Due to the level of skepticism surrounding the will, it was not until April 26, 1897, that it was approved by the Storting (Norwegian Parliament). The Nobel Foundation was formed to take care of Nobel's fortune and organize the prizes.

The members of the Norwegian Nobel Committee that were to award the Peace Prize were appointed shortly after the will was approved. The prize-awarding organizations followed: the Karolinska Institutet on June 7, the Swedish Academy on June 9, and the Royal Swedish Academy of Sciences on June 11. The Nobel Foundation then reached an agreement on guidelines for how the Nobel Prize should be awarded. In 1900, the Nobel Foundation's newly created statutes were promulgated by King Oscar II. According to Nobel's will, The Royal Swedish Academy of Sciences was to award the Prize in Chemistry.

== Award ceremony ==
The committee and institution serving as the selection board for the prize typically announce the names of the laureates in October. The prize is then awarded at formal ceremonies held annually on December 10, the anniversary of Alfred Nobel's death. Later the Nobel Banquet is held in Stockholm City Hall.

== Nomination and selection ==
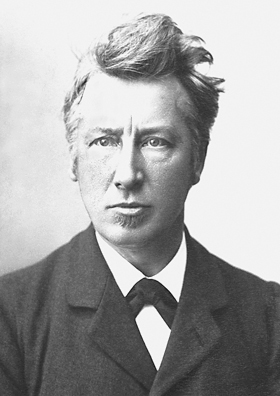
In 1901, Jacobus Henricus van 't Hoff (1852–1911) received the first Nobel Prize in Chemistry.

The Nobel Laureates in chemistry are selected by a committee that consists of five members elected by the Royal Swedish Academy of Sciences. In its first stage, several thousand people are asked to nominate candidates. These names are scrutinized and discussed by experts until only the laureates remain.

Forms are sent to about three thousand selected individuals to invite them to submit nominations. The names of the nominees are never publicly announced, and neither are nominees told that they have been considered for the Prize. Nomination records are sealed for fifty years, but in practice, some nominees do become known. It is also common for publicists to make such a claim – founded or not.

The nominations are screened by the committee, and a list is produced of approximately two hundred preliminary candidates. This list is forwarded to selected experts in the field. They remove all but approximately fifteen names. The committee then submits a report with recommendations to the appropriate institution.

While posthumous nominations are not permitted, awards can occur if the individual dies in the months between the nomination and the decision of the prize committee.

The award in chemistry requires that the significance of achievements is "tested by time". In practice, it means that the lag between the discovery and the award is typically on the order of 20 years and can be even longer. As a downside of this approach, not all scientists live long enough for their work to be recognized by this award.

A maximum of three laureates and two different works may be selected. The award can be given to a maximum of three recipients per year.

== Prizes ==
A Chemistry Nobel Prize laureate earns a gold medal, a diploma bearing a citation, and a sum of money.

=== Nobel Prize medals ===
The medal for the Nobel Prize in Chemistry is identical in design to the Nobel Prize in Physics medal. The reverse of the physics and chemistry medals depict the Goddess of Nature in the form of Isis as she emerges from clouds holding a cornucopia. The Genius of Science holds the veil which covers Nature's 'cold and austere face'. It was designed by Erik Lindberg and is manufactured by Svenska Medalj in Eskilstuna. It is inscribed "Inventas vitam iuvat excoluisse per artes" ("It is beneficial to have improved [human] life through discovered arts") an adaptation of "inventas aut qui vitam excoluere per artes" from line 663 from book 6 of the Aeneid by the Roman poet Virgil. A plate below the figures is inscribed with the name of the recipient. The text "REG. ACAD. SCIENT. SUEC." denoting the Royal Swedish Academy of Sciences is inscribed on the reverse.

=== Nobel Prize diplomas ===
Nobel laureates receive a diploma directly from the hands of the King of Sweden. Each diploma is uniquely designed by the prize-awarding institutions for the laureate that receives it. The diploma contains a picture and text that states the name of the laureate and normally a citation of why they received the prize.

=== Award money ===
At the awards ceremony, the laureate is given a document indicating the award sum. The amount of the cash award may differ from year to year, based on the funding available from the Nobel Foundation. For example, in 2009 the total cash awarded was 10 million SEK (US$1.4 million), but in 2012, the amount was 8 million Swedish Krona, or US$1.1 million. If there are two laureates in a particular category, the award grant is divided equally between the recipients, but if there are three, the awarding committee may opt to divide the grant equally, or award half to one recipient and a quarter to each of the two others.

== Scope of award ==
In recent years, the Nobel Prize in Chemistry has drawn criticism from chemists who feel that the prize is more frequently awarded to non-chemists than to chemists. In the 30 years leading up to 2012, the Nobel Prize in Chemistry was awarded ten times for work classified as biochemistry or molecular biology, and once to a materials scientist. In the ten years leading up to 2012, only four prizes were awarded for work strictly in chemistry. Commenting on the scope of the award, The Economist explained that the Royal Swedish Academy of Sciences is bound by Nobel's bequest, which specifies awards only in physics, chemistry, literature, medicine, and peace. Biology was in its infancy in Nobel's day and no award was established. The Economist argued there is no Nobel Prize for mathematics either, another major discipline, and added that Nobel's stipulation of no more than three winners is not readily applicable to modern physics, where progress is typically made through huge collaborations rather than by individuals alone.

In 2020, Ioannidis et al. reported that half of the Nobel Prizes for science awarded between 1995 and 2017 were clustered in just a few disciplines within their broader fields. Atomic physics, particle physics, cell biology, and neuroscience dominated the two subjects outside chemistry, while molecular chemistry was the chief prize-winning discipline in its domain. Molecular chemists won 5.3% of all science Nobel Prizes during this period.

== See also ==
- List of Nobel laureates in Chemistry
- Louisa Gross Horwitz Prize
- List of chemistry awards
- List of Nobel laureates
- Nobel laureates by country
- Priestley Medal
- Wolf Prize in Chemistry
- List of female nominees for the Nobel Prize
