= Maria Tedeschi =

Italian writer (born 1965)

- Born: 14 November 1965 (age 60); Naples, Italy
- Died: 14 January 2026
- Occupations: Novelist and linguist
- Writing career
- Language: Italian

Maria Tedeschi (born 14 November 1965) is an Italian writer and professor. She gained is known for her work La trilogia delle rose and her nomination for the Nobel Prize in Literature.

== Personal life ==
Maria Tedeschi was born on 14 November 1965 in Naples, Italy. She currently lives in Sant'Antonio Abate, Naples with her husband Aldo and two children Domenico and Maria Grazia.

== Career ==
Tedeschi has served as the student's internationalization and mobility point since she joined the faculty of English Language and Civilization at the Liceo Classico Plinio Seniore in Castellammare di Stabia, Pompeii. She has overseen English-language public relations specifically with Eastern nations. She chose this mode of operation as her life philosophy and has been an ambassador of kindness for the Cor et Amor association in Ivrea for a number of years.

=== Recognition ===
She received the 2023 Career Award and the 2023 Literature Award from the Universum Academy University of Peace Switzerland. In 2024, Tedeschi was nominated for the Nobel Prize in Literature by Francesco Avolio, a linguistics professor at the University of L'Aquila. He described her as an author who "managed to address, with a decisive and never trivial style, crucial themes for humanity."

== Publications ==
Her first published work was Non chiudere quella porta in 2020. She then went on to write La Maiastra e le vite invisibili in 2022, which won the Italian Cultural Institute of Naples' 2021 edition of the International Literature Prize and earned a special mention from the technical jury of journalists and writers at Sanremo writers 2023. La trilogia delle rose (also 2022) is considered her penultimate work and was nominated for the Campiello Prize. Her latest work Il donatore di sangue was published on 2023, and is a story that talks about love and hope, but also about an incredible legend.
