= Nelsa Curbelo =

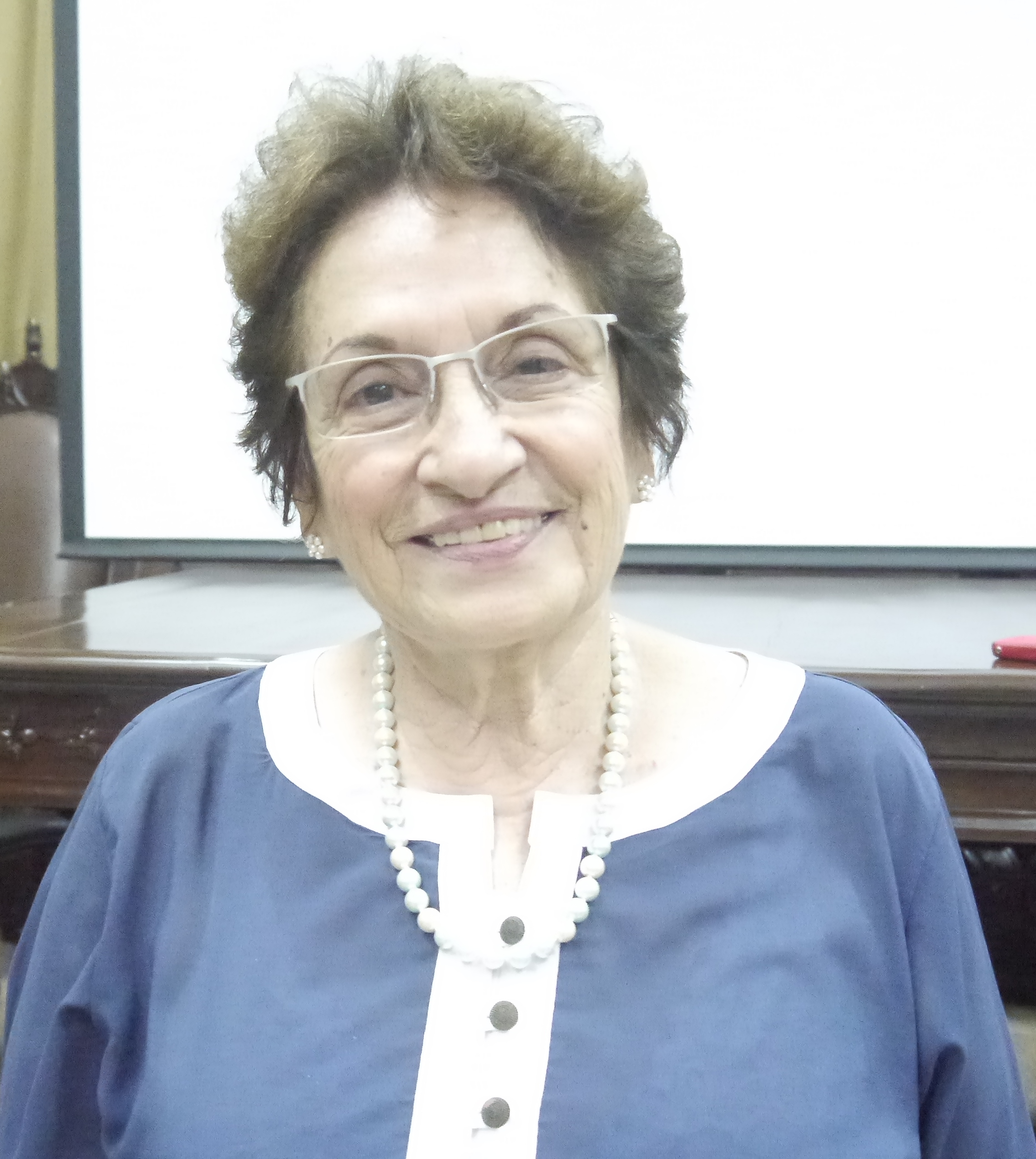
- Nelsa Curbelo in 2016
- Born: Nelsa Libertad Curbelo Cora; 1 November 1941 (age 84); Montevideo
- Occupations: Artist, activist

Nelsa Libertad Curbelo Cora (born 1 November 1941) is an Uruguayan human rights activist, artist, and former nun. Though she was born in Uruguay, she was active in Ecuador as an activist for the rights of indigenous peoples. Curbelo was a member of the Mediation Commission with the Confederation of Indigenous Nationalities of Ecuador following the 1990 uprising, witnessed the surrendering of arms by Contra groups to the Sandinista government of Nicaragua, and participated in the peace accord between guerrilla fighters and the government of Guatemala. She is the founder of Ser Paz, a Guayaquil-based organization to help reintegrate former gang members into society. Curbelo has twice been nominated for the Nobel Peace Prize.

== Biography ==
Nelsa Curbelo was born on 1 November 1941 to a family of atheists in Montevideo, Uruguay. At 20 years of age, she adopted Roman Catholicism and was baptized in France in 1970. Intrigued by the Amerindian cultures of Ecuador, Cerbelo decided that same year to travel to the Andean nation to work as a missionary.

In 1999, Curbelo was elected to Ashoka as a Fellow.

== Ser Paz ==
Participating in the Truth and Life Commission in Ecuador, Curbelo listened to first-hand accounts from former police officers of their roles in the torture and murder of hundreds of people. While working in Guayaquil, an unmarked grave used as a dump by the government containing some 200 corpses was found. This event profoundly affected Curbelo, and she decided to focus her activist efforts on a more personal level rather than in courts. Guayaquil, the largest city in Ecuador with a population of three million at the time, is also the country's most dangerous, being home to over 200 gangs, of which some 60,000 disaffected youths were members.

On 16 April 1999, Curbelo founded the non-profit organization Ser Paz, in English "Being Peace," to help the city's youths and reintegrate gang members into society. Beginning in her resident barrio of Guayaquil, she established mediation workshops and small businesses to settle gang disputes and give their members employment. For the first two years of operation, Curbelo met with and heard the grievances of many Guayaquil youths. In 2006, the NGO began the "Barrio del Paz" program, which would cover 42 of the most violent and criminally active blocks in the city. Twelve small businesses, such as a print shop, salon, and furniture store, were established and staffed by mixed groups of youths from various gangs.

The effect of Ser Paz was immediate and impactful; in one instance, gangs that had been enemies until Ser Paz mediated their conflict allegedly piled their weapons in the street and drove over them with a steamroller.
