= Nicola Giordano =

Italian chemist

Nicola Giordano (Messina, 16 June 1931 – Messina, 10 May 1996) was an Italian scientist.

== Biography ==
Giordano graduated in Chemistry at the University of Messina (August 1952).

After serving in the army, he joined (June 1955) the Montedison where he became plant manager of the units for production of hydrogen by partial oxidation of methane and gas-shift reaction (P. Marghera, Venice). Assignee of a scholarship, he attended, from Sept. '58 to Sept. '59, post-graduate courses at the Johns Hopkins University under the supervision of Paul Hugh Emmett.

In January 1960 he joined the Montedison Research Center of Bollate (Milano) where he organized and directed a research group on catalysis with interests ranging from basic to applied researches in the field of petrochemicals (oxidation, halogenations, hydrogenation, cracking and others). In this position he has developed new classes of catalysts which has won industrial acceptance as in the Montedison acrylonitrile and chlorofluorocarbons processes. In June 1974 he joined the Research Center of Priolo, as consultant: in this position, he worked on improvements in numerous petrochemicals and petroleum refinery processes.

From 1963 to 1972 he was assistant professor of “Theory and Development of Chemical Processes” at the University of Padova. From 1973 to 1975 was associated professor of Industrial Chemistry at the University of Messina (Sicily). In November 1975, winner of the chair of Industrial Chemistry, he resigned from Montedison to become full professor at the University of Messina. Adjointly to the University position, he was nominated, in 1980, director of the Institute CNR of “Researches on Methods and Chemical Processes for Transformation and Storage of Energy” and director of the two-year post-doctor school on “Chemistry and Technology of Catalysis”. In July 1983, he was appointed adjunct professor of Chemistry at the University of Illinois-Chicago, where he held the course on “Industrial Catalysis”.

He was author of more than 400 papers or communications to congresses and more than 40 Italian patents, most of which extended to foreign countries.

He was a member of the American Chemical Society, of the Electrochemical Society, the International Zeolite Association, the Sigma Xi, the New York Academy of Sciences, and the American Institute of Chemical Engineers. He served as a member of the board of directors of the Italian Chemical Society (Division of Industrial Chemistry) and in numerous others committees and institutions.

== Scientific activity ==
The scientific interests of Professor Nicola Giordano covered mainly the topics of catalysis (including electrocatalysis), fuel cells and industrial chemistry. His activity was characterized by a wide production of publications, patents for both Italian and international companies as well as for Italian National Council of Research and the University of Messina.

The most relevant aspects regarded the synthesis of acrylonitrile, production of synthetic zeolites, new catalytic formulation for chemical processes, development of electrocatalysts and components for fuel cells. Great relevance has played the investigation about the influence of the platinum crystallite size and metal-support interaction on the electrocatalytic activity for the oxygen reduction at fuel cell electrocatalysts.

During the last period of his activity, his efforts were addressed to the study of new electrolytes consisting of heteropolyacids, such as phosphotungstic acid, for application in fuel cells operating at low temperature. The electrolytes studied by Professor Giordano have shown significantly better performances compared to conventional systems.

Both publication and patents of Professor Giordano have received great attention as demonstrated by the thousands of citations received.
