= Latifa Ibn Ziaten =

French-Moroccan activist

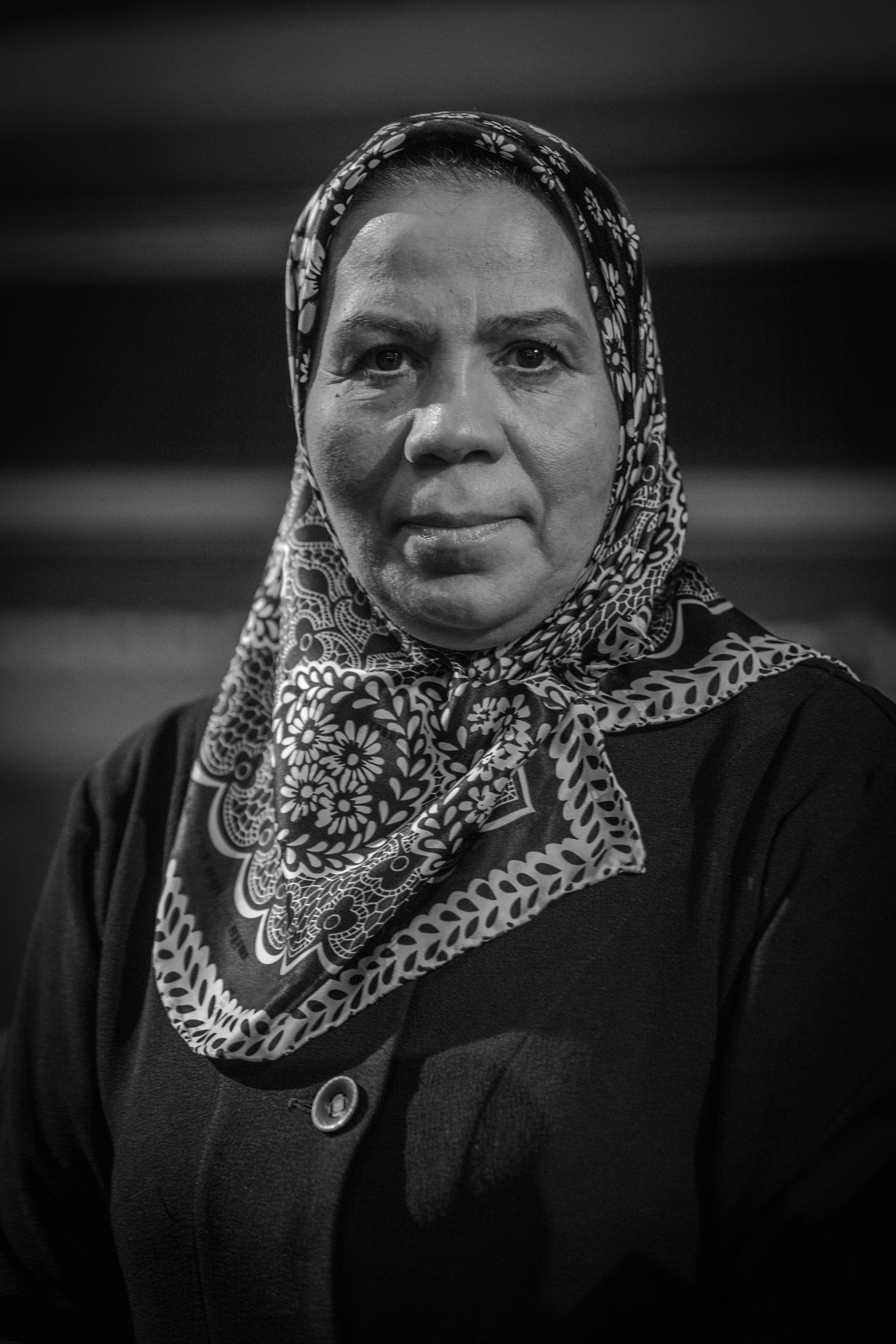
- Latifa ibn Ziaten, (2016)
- Born: 1 January 1960 (age 66); Tétouan
- Known for: violence prevention
- Notable work: Imad ibn Ziaten youth association for peace

Latifa Ibn Ziaten (Arabic: لطيفة بن زياتين born 1 January 1960 in Tétouan, Morocco) is a French-Moroccan activist. She is the mother of Imad ibn Ziaten, born in 1981, the first service member in Toulouse killed by Mohammed Merah on 11 March 2012.

== Life ==
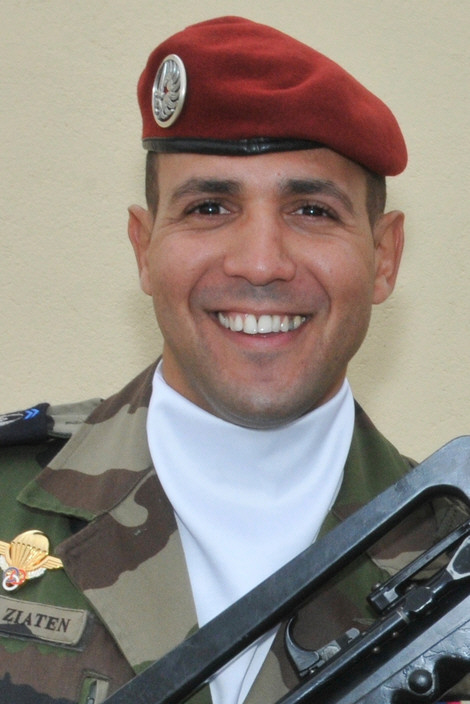
Imad Ibn Ziaten

She is a practicing Muslim, and arrived in France in 1977 at the age of 17, to join her husband Ahmed who worked for the SNCF. She is the mother of five, four boys and one girl. One son was Imad Ibn Ziaten, sergeant of the 1st paratroop Regiment who was traveling from Francazal near Toulouse, when the terrorist Mohammed Merah murdered him on March 11, 2012.

She then worked as a supervisor and receptionist at the Museum of Fine Arts of Rouen.

After the death of her son, she went to Izards, the underprivileged neighbourhood in the northeast of Toulouse where the murderer lived. where she asked a group of teenagers if they knew Merah. She told the media that they answered: "Don't you watch TV, Madame? He's a hero, a martyr for Islam!"

Following this meeting, she decided to create the Imad ibn Ziaten youth association for peace and in April 2012, in order to help young people in deprived areas, and to promote secularism and interreligious dialogue. The association is sponsored by actor Jamel Debbouze, and an office is created in Paris 4th district town hall by Christophe Girard.

In February 2014, attended by the Interior Minister, Manuel Valls, the Representative Council of Jewish Institutions in France (CRIF) Midi-Pyrénées honored her association by giving her an award for her work. She also received support from the Ministry of Education which awards an annual grant.

In January 2015, she was invited to the Synagogue de la Victoire in Paris, attended by President François Hollande, to light a candle in honor of the seventeen victims of the attack against Charlie Hebdo and the hostages in the kosher Hyper store near Vincennes.

On November 19, 2015, with President Hollande, Latifa Ibn Ziaten received the Prize for Prevention Conflict by the Fondation Chirac, for her continued promotion of inter-religious dialogue and a culture of peace.

In 2016, she received an International Women of Courage Award.

== Works ==
- Mort pour la France : Mohamed Merah a tué mon fils, Paris, Flammarion, 2013, 268 ISBN 978-2-08-129612-1

== Awards ==
- Chevalier de la Légion d'honneur (from 14 July 2015)
- 2015 recipient of fondation Chirac price for conflict prevention
- International Women of Courage Award.

== See also ==
- Tueries de mars 2012 à Toulouse et Montauban
