= Louis-Arsène Delaunay =

French actor (1826–1903)

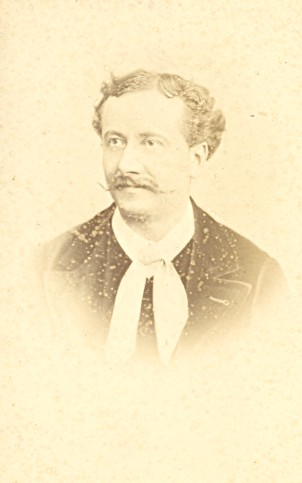
Louis Arsène Delaunay

Louis-Arsène Delaunay (1826–1903), French actor, was born in Paris, the son of a wine-seller. He studied at the Conservatoire, and made his first formal appearance on the stage in 1845, in Molière's Tartuffe at the Odéon, where he was engaged for two years as a lead juvenile.

In 1848, he made his debut at the Comédie-Française as Dorante in Pierre Corneille's Le Menteur, and began a long and brilliant career in young lover parts. He became a regular member of Comédie-Française in 1850. He continued to act as jeune premier until he was sixty, his grace, marvellous diction and passion enchanting his audiences. It was especially in the plays of Alfred de Musset that his gifts found their happiest expression. In the 37 years during which he was a member of the Comédie-Française, Delaunay took or created nearly two hundred parts.

In 1877, he was appointed professor of dramatic declamation at the Conservatoire de Paris. He retired in 1887, having been made a Chevalier of the Légion d'honneur in 1883.
