= Ernest Gale =

British microbiologist (1914–2005)

Ernest Frederick Gale FRS (15 July 1914 – 7 March 2005) was a British microbiologist. In 1952, Dr. Gale developed the microbial infallibility hypothesis, which states that the buildup of compounds initially resistant to biodegradation exerts a strong selective pressure on nearby microbes to evolve to consume them. This theory undergirds the fields of medical and environmental bioremediation.

He was a Fellow of St John's College, Cambridge from 1941 – 44 and 1949–88.
