= List of nominees for the Nobel Prize in Physiology or Medicine (1930–1939) =

The following is a list of people first nominated for the Nobel Prize in Physiology or Medicine between 1930 and 1939 by year of first nomination.

The Nobel Prize in Physiology or Medicine (Swedish: Nobelpriset i fysiologi eller medicin) is awarded annually by the Nobel Assembly at the Karolinska Institute to scientists who have made outstanding contributions in physiology or medicine. It is one of the five Nobel Prizes which were established by the will of Alfred Nobel in 1895.

Every year, the Nobel Committee for Physiology or Medicine sends out forms, which amount to a personal and exclusive invitation, to about three thousand selected individuals to invite them to submit nominations. The names of the nominees are never publicly announced, and neither are they told that they have been considered for the Prize. Nomination records are strictly sealed for fifty years. However, the nominations for the years 1901 to 1953 are publicly available. Despite the annual sending of invitations, the prize was not awarded in nine years (1915–1918, 1921, 1925, 1940–1942) and has been delayed for a year five times (1919, 1922, 1926, 1938, 1943).

From 1901 to 1953, 935 scientists were nominated for the prize, 63 of which were awarded either jointly or individually. 19 more scientists from these nominees were awarded after 1953. Of the 13 women nominees, only G.Th.Cori was awarded the prize. Besides some scientists from these nominees won the prizes in other fields (including years after 1953): J.Boyd Orr - Peace Prize (1949); L.C.Pauling twice - in Chemistry (1954) and Peace Prize (1962); 3 - in Physics and 20 - in Chemistry (including Fr.Sanger twice - in 1958 and 1980).

In addition, nominations of 65 scientists (including one woman) were declared invalid by the Nobel Committee.

== See also ==
- List of nominees for the Nobel Prize in Physiology or Medicine (1901–1909)
- List of nominees for the Nobel Prize in Physiology or Medicine (1910–1919)
- List of nominees for the Nobel Prize in Physiology or Medicine (1920–1929)
- List of nominees for the Nobel Prize in Physiology or Medicine (1940–1949)
- List of nominees for the Nobel Prize in Physiology or Medicine (1950–1959)

== 1930–1939 ==
Picture	Name	Born	Died	Years nominated	Notes
1930
	Edgar Adrian (Note: "Work on sensory nerves and their mode of action")	November 30, 1889 Hampstead, London, England	August 4, 1977 Cambridge, England	1930, 1931, 1932	Shared the 1932 Nobel Prize in Physiology or Medicine (Note: “for their discoveries regarding the functions of neurons”) with Ch.Sc.Sherrington
	Achille Sclavo (Note: "The discovery of serum against anthrax")	March 21, 1861 Lesegno, Kingdom of Italy	June 2, 1930 Siena, Kingdom of Italy	1914, 1930	Died before the only chance to be rewarded
	Léon Fredericq (Note: "Work on the physiology of the heart and respiration, ecpecially considering hemocyanine")	August 24, 1851 Ghent, Belgium	September 2, 1935 Liège, Belgium	1930	
	Edwin Beer (Note: "The discovery of the fulgaration treatment of papillomata and other tumors of the bladder")	March 1876 New York City, United States	August 13, 1938 New York City, United States	1930	Nominated by Al.V.Moschcowitz the only time
	Richard Ritter von Zeynek (Note: "Work on diathermy")	December 9, 1869 Graz, United States	June 28, 1945 Passau, Germany	1930	
	Erich Rominger (Note: "Work on the mineral and water metabolism in the growing human organism")	May 3, 1886 Freiburg im Breisgau, German Empire	January 28, 1967 Freiburg im Breisgau, Germany	1930	
	Ludvig Emil Walbum (Note: "Work on metalsalt treatment of certain infections (tuberculosis, tetanus) in animals")	August 24, 1879 Nakskov, Denmark	September 2, 1943 Gentofte, Denmark	1930	Nominated with E.Steinach by H.H.Meyer the only time
	Paul Alfred Weiss (Note: "Work on the mineral and water metabolism in the growing human organism")	March 21, 1898 Vienna, Austria-Hungary	September 8, 1989 White Plains, New York, United States	1930	Nominated with E.Steinach by H.H.Meyer the only time
	Alice R Bernheim (Note: "Studies on the functional relations of calcium and the Parathyroids in normal and deranged metabolism of man")	September 28, 1878 Cincinnati, United States	July 14, 1968 Cincinnati, United States	1930	Nominated by William Cogswell Clarke (2.7.1872 Tenafly - 1943) the only time
	Robert Sazerac (Note: "Work on the use of bismuth in the treatment of syphilis")	September 14, 1875 Limoges, France	1943	1930	Nominated with C.Levaditi by P.P.Ém.Roux the only time
	Eugen Bleuler (Note: "Work on schizophrenia")	April 30, 1857 Zollikon, Switzerland	July 15, 1939 Zollikon, Switzerland	1930	Nominated by R.Gaupp the only time
	Cornelis Winkler (Note: "for work on neurology, and his latest experimental work: "Annotations on the physiology and anatomy of a dog living 38 days without both hemispheres of the cerbrum and without cerebellum"")	February 25, 1855 Vianen, Netherlands	May 8, 1941 Hoog Soeren, Netherlands	1930	Nominated by C.von Monakow the only time
	Alfred Kohn (Note: "Work on the parathyroid gland and chromaphine tissue")	February 22, 1867 Libin (part of Lubenz), Austria-Hungary	January 15, 1959 Prague, Czechia	1930, 1932	
	Pietro Tullio (Note: "Work on functions of the ear")	1881 San Vito al Tagliamento, Kingdom of Italy	1941 Genoa, Kingdom of Italy	1930, 1932	
	Jules Gonin (Note: "Work on treatment of detachment of the retina with cauterization")	August 10, 1870 Lausanne, Switzerland	June 10, 1935 Lausanne, Switzerland	1930, 1934, 1935, 1936	
	William Hallock Park (Note: "The application of toxin antitoxin treatment to mass immunization against diphtheria")	December 30, 1863 New York City, United States	April 6, 1939 New York City, United States	1930, 1936	
	Giuseppe Sanarelli (Note: "Work on the etiology of cholera and spirochetosis")	September 24, 1865 Monte San Savino, Kingdom of Italy	April 6, 1940 Rome, Kingdom of Italy	1930, 1935, 1936, 1937	
	Rudolf Weigl (Note: "Work on typhus fever, especially the virus Rickettsia Provazeki")	September 2, 1883 Prerau, Austria-Hungary	August 11, 1957 Zakopane, Poland	1930, 1931, 1932, 1933, 1934, 1936, 1937, 1938, 1939	
	Frank Charles Mann (Note: "The discovery that a high percentage of the bile pigments excreted by the liver are extrahepatic in origin, and also the site of its formation")	September 11, 1887 Adams County, Indiana, United States	September 30, 1962	1930, 1931, 1934, 1936, 1939, 1941	
	René Leriche (Note: "Work on the surgery of sympathicus")	October 12, 1879 Roanne, France	December 20, 1955 Cassis, France	1930, 1931, 1934, 1936, 1937, 1938, 1943, 1944, 1946, 1948, 1949, 1950, 1951, 1952, 1953, 1955, 1956	
	Gaston Ramon (Note: "The discovery of anatoxin")	September 30, 1886 Bellechaume, France	June 8, 1963 Paris, France	1930, 1931, 1932, 1933, 1934, 1935, 1936, 1937, 1938, 1939, 1940, 1941, 1942, 1946, 1947, 1948, 1949, 1950, 1951, 1952, 1953, 1955, 1956	
1931
	Edward Adelbert Doisy (Note: “Work on the crystallization of a follicular ovarian hormone”)	November 13, 1893 Hume, Illinois, United States	October 23, 1986 St. Louis, United States	1931, 1936, 1941, 1944	Shared the 1943 Nobel Prize in Physiology or Medicine (Note: “for his discovery of the chemical nature of vitamin K”) with C.P.H.Dam one year later
	Bernardo Houssay (Note: "Work on the physiology of the hypophysis, its role in carbohydrate metabolism")	April 10, 1887 Buenos Aires, Argentina	September 21, 1971 Buenos Aires, Argentina	1931, 1934, 1935, 1936, 1937, 1939, 1940, 1941, 1942, 1943, 1944, 1946, 1947, 1948	Shared the 1947 Nobel Prize in Physiology or Medicine (Note: “for his discovery of the part played by the hormone of the anterior pituitary lobe in the metabolism of sugar”) with C.F.Cori and G.Th.Cori
	Victor Heiser	February 5, 1873 Johnstown, Pennsylvania, United States	February 27, 1972 Brooklyn, New York City, United States	1931	Nominated the only time by Arthur D. Hirschfelder with Ch.Harington and jointly (Note: "The treatment and cure of leprosy by means of derivatives of chaulmoogra oil") with L.Rogers
	Henry Herbert Donaldson (Note: "Work on the postnatal growth and development of the mammalian nervous system, particularly as illustrated by the nervous system of the albino rat")	May 12, 1857 Yonkers, New York, United States	January 23, 1938 Philadelphia, United States	1931	Nominated by Samuel Weiller Fernberger (Philadelphia: 4.6.1887-2.5.1956) the only time
	James Ewing (Note: "Work on the pathology and treatment of tumors")	December 25, 1866 Pittsburgh, United States	May 16, 1943 New York City, United States	1931	Nominated by G.E.Pfahler the only time
	Berkeley Moynihan (Note: "Work on the technique and the practice of the treatment of gastric and duodenal ulcers, of operations for gall stones, and for diseases of the pancreas")	October 2, 1865 Malta, British Empire	September 7, 1936	1931	Nominated with Th.Lewis by George Ernest Gask (1875–1951) the only time
	Henry Drysdale Dakin	March 12, 1880 London, England	February 10, 1952 Scarsdale, New York, United States	1931	Nominated jointly (Note: "Work on the specific substance that cures pernicious anemia and is found in liver-extract") with G.Minot by J.Fr.McClendon the only time
	Jean-François Heymans (Note: "Work on the physiology and pharmacology of respiration and blood circulation (Much of the work was done in collaboration with Heyman´s son, Corneille J.F. Heymans (NP med 1938))")	December 25, 1859 Gooik, Belgium	April 10, 1932 Middelkerke, Belgium	1931	
	Jean Eugène Bataillon (Note: "The discovery of traumatic pathogenesis in batrachians")	October 22, 1864 Annoire, France	November 1, 1953 Montpellier, France	1931	Nominated by Jean Turchini (4.7.1894 - 4.1.1979) the only time
	Hugo Paul Friedrich Schulz (Note: "Work on the Arndt-Schulz´s rule, silicic acid, formic acid and sulfur")	August 6, 1853 Wesel, Kingdom of Prussia, German Confederation	July 13, 1932 Berlin, Weimar Germany	1931	Nominated with F.Sauerbruch by A.Bier the only time
	Moses Swick (Goldstein) (Note: "Work in connection with Intravenous Urography (uroselectan)")	February 16, 1900 New York City, United States	August 7, 1985 New York City, United States	1931	Nominated with Edw.Ad.Doisy by Henry Erdmann Radasch (7.5.1874 Keokuk, Iowa - 29.11.1942 Philadelphia) the only time
	Wolfgang Ostwald (Note: "Work on the area of colloid chemistry")	May 27, 1883 Riga, Governorate of Livonia, Russian Empire	November 22, 1943 Dresden, Nazi Germany	1931	Nominated with L.Michaelis and Otto H.Warburg by K.Spiro the only time
	Giuseppe Levi (Note: "Work on tissue cultivation in vitro")	October 14, 1872 Triest, Austrian Littoral, Austria-Hungary	February 3, 1965 Turin, Italy	1931	Nominated by Ang.C.Bruni the only time
	Fernand Arloing (Note: "for discoveries on anaphylactic shock")	February 28, 1876 Toulouse, France	September 9, 1944 Lyon, France	1931	Nominated by Charles Auguste "Maurice" Patel (Lyon: 13.12.1875-9.6.1967) the only time
	Phoebus Levene (Note: "Work on the chemical constitution of the animal cell, especially the structure of thymonucleic acid")	February 25, 1869 Sagor, Kovno Governorate, Russian Empire	September 6, 1940 New York City, United States	1931, 1932, 1934, 1938	Nominated for the Nobel Prize in Chemistry too
	Kure Ken (Note: "Work on the tonic and trophic innervation of voluntary muscles and spinal parasympathicus, and progressive muscular dystrophy")	October 27, 1883 Tokyo, Japan	June 27, 1940 Tokyo, Japan	1931, 1933, 1935, 1936, 1937, 1939	
	August Ludolf Brauer (Note: "Collapse treatment of lung tuberculosis, especially thoracoplasty; also in relation to cardiolysis and intermittent positive pressure breathing")	July 1, 1865 Rittergut Hohenhaus, Landkreis Thorn, Kingdom of Prussia	November 25, 1951 Munich, Germany	1931, 1948, 1949, 1952	
	Selmar Aschheim (Note: "Work on the sex hormones of the ovary and the anterior pituitary lobe")	October 4, 1878 Berlin, German Empire	February 15, 1965 Paris, France	1931, 1932, 1933, 1934, 1936, 1937, 1941, 1952, 1953, 1955	
	Alfred Newton Richards (Note: "Work on the physiology of the kidneys (catheterizing of individual renal glomeruli)")	March 22, 1876 Stamford, New York, United States	March 24, 1966 Bryn Mawr, Pennsylvania, United States	1931, 1937, 1938, 1939, 1940, 1942, 1944, 1945, 1946, 1947, 1950, 1956	
	Bernhard Zondek (Note: "Work on hormones, especially hormones of the follicle and pituitary gland, and on pregnancy reaction")	July 29, 1891 Wronke, German Empire	November 8, 1966 New York City, United States	1931, 1932, 1933, 1934, 1935, 1936, 1937, 1938, 1940, 1941, 1952, 1953, 1955, 1956	
1932
	Hermann Joseph Muller (Note: "Work on genetics, "crossing over", lethal factors, the demonstration of a fourth coupling group in the genes of Drosophila, the effect of temperature changes and X-rays on the mutation rate")	December 21, 1890 New York City, United States	April 5, 1967 Indianapolis, Indiana, United States	1932, 1934, 1939, 1940, 1945, 1946, 1947	Won the 1946 Nobel Prize in Physiology or Medicine (Note: “for the discovery of the production of mutations by means of X-ray irradiation”)
	James B. Sumner (Note: "work on the isolation of crystalline urease")	November 19, 1887 Canton, Massachusetts, United States	August 12, 1955 Buffalo, New York, United States	1932, 1939, 1940, 1943, 1944, 1946	Shared the 1946 Nobel Prize in Chemistry (Note: “J.B.Sumner for his discovery that enzymes can be crystallized”) (J.H.Northrop jointly (Note: “for their preparation of enzymes and virus proteins in a pure form”) with W.M.Stanley)
	John Howard Northrop (Note: "Work on the isolation of crystalline pepsin")	July 5, 1891 Yonkers, New York, United States	May 27, 1987 Wickenburg, Arizona, United States	1932, 1935, 1937, 1938, 1939, 1940, 1941, 1942, 1943, 1944, 1946	Shared the 1946 Nobel Prize in Chemistry (J.H.Northrop jointly with W.M.Stanley)
	Heinrich William (Wilhelm) Poll	August 5, 1877 Berlin, German Empire	June 12, 1939 Lund, Sweden	1932	Nominated jointly (Note: "Work on inherited and acquired causes of disease in twins") and with F.d'Hérelle by R.Müller the only time
	Hermann Werner Siemens	August 20, 1891 Charlottenburg, Berlin, German Empire	December 21, 1969 Leiden, Netherlands	1932	Nominated jointly and with F.d'Hérelle by R.Müller the only time
	Otmar Freiherr von Verschuer (Note: "Work on human twins")	July 16, 1896 Wildeck, German Empire	August 8, 1969 Münster, Germany	1932	Nominated by Aemilius Bernardus Droogleever Fortuyn (7.11.1886 Rotterdam - 13.8.1970 Utrecht) the only time
	Marcel Labbé (Note: "Work on diabetes, especially the prediabetic state")	December 4, 1870 Le Havre, France	May 29, 1939 Paris, France	1932	Nominated by Ahm.Z.P.Birgi the only time
	Henri Joseph Gaudier (Note: "Work on the treatment of scars")	April 6, 1866 Mâcon, France	July 1942 Lille, France	1932	
	Stanley Rossiter Benedict	March 17, 1884 Cincinnati, United States	December 21, 1936 Elmsford, New York, United States	1932	Nominated jointly (Note: "Work on the analysis of blood and urine (Benedict: creatine, creatinine, sulfur, sugar. Folin: urea nitrogen, amino acids, uric acid, creatinine, blood sugar)") with Otto Folin by Victor Caril Myers (13.4.1883 Buskirk Bridge, New York - 7.10.1948 New York City) the only time
	William Robert Smith (Note: "Work on hygiene. The founder of The Royal Institute of Public Health")	May 28, 1850 Plumstead, England	March 17, 1932 London, England	1932	Nominated by Th.Oliver the only time but died before the only chance to be rewarded
	Kemal Cenap Berksoy (Note: "Work on endocrine secretion")	1875 Istanbul, Ottoman Empire	November 28, 1949	1932	Nominated by S.Akn.Hamdi the only time
	Heinrich Ewald Hering (Note: "Work on the function of the control of blood pressure")	May 3, 1866 Vienna, Austrian Empire	December 12, 1948 Papenhusen, Germany	1932, 1933, 1934, 1937	
	Einar Lundsgaard (Note: "The demonstration that phosphagen is the direct energy producing substance of the muscular contraction")	February 12, 1899 Frederiksberg, Denmark	December 18, 1968 Copenhagen, Denmark	1932, 1952	
	Wilbur Willis Swingle (Note: "Work on the hormone from the cortex and the suprarenal gland")	January 11, 1891 Warrensburg, Missouri, United States	1975	1932	Nominated with G.R.Minot and Osw.Th.Avery Jr. by Lewellys Franklin Barker (1867–1943) the only time
	Oswald Theodore Avery Jr. (Note: "The chemo-immunological studies on conjugated carbohydrate proteins")	October 21, 1877 Halifax, Nova Scotia, Canada	February 20, 1955 Nashville, Tennessee, United States	1932, 1933, 1934, 1935, 1936, 1937, 1938, 1939, 1942, 1945, 1946, 1947, 1948, 1949, 1950, 1951, 1952, 1953, 1955	Nominated for the Nobel Prize in Chemistry too
	Ernst Löwenstein	January 24, 1878 Karlsbad, Austria-Hungary	August 28, 1950 Berkeley, California, United States	1932, 1955	Nominated jointly (Note: "Work on anatoxins as vaccination against diphtheria and tetanus") with G.Ramon only
	David Keilin (Note: "Work on cytochromes and respiration ferment (enzymes)")	March 21, 1887 Moscow, Russian Empire	February 27, 1963 Cambridge, England	1932, 1937, 1938, 1939, 1940, 1941, 1945, 1946, 1950, 1953, 1955, 1956	Nominated for the Nobel Prize in Chemistry too
	Elmer McCollum (Note: "The discovery of vitamins A, B and D, and the discovery of the role of manganese and magnesium in animal metabolism")	March 3, 1879 Redfield, Kansas, United States	November 15, 1967 Baltimore, United States	1932, 1934, 1936, 1943, 1956	
1933
	Walter Rudolf Hess (Note: "Work on occupational physiology and the interaction between psychic and vegetative functions")	March 17, 1881 Frauenfeld, Switzerland	August 12, 1973 Locarno, Switzerland	1933, 1935, 1939, 1942, 1943, 1944, 1945, 1946, 1947, 1948, 1949	Shared the 1949 Nobel Prize in Physiology or Medicine (Note: “for his discovery of the functional organization of the interbrain as a coordinator of the activities of the internal organs”) with Ant.C.de Abr.Fr. Egas Moniz
	Martin Benno Schmidt (Note: "Work on blood distribution in higher organisms")	August 23, 1863 Leipzig, Kingdom of Saxony, German Confederation	November 27, 1949 Mittenwald, Germany	1933	Nominated by Georg Burckhard (15.5.1872 Jena – 2.3.1955 Lohr am Main) the only time
	Jean Cantacuzène (Note: "Work on immunity reaction in invertebrates and contact immunity")	November 25, 1863 Bucharest, Romania	January 14, 1934 Bucharest, Romania	1933	
	Vassili Ivanovich Kedrowski (Note: "Work on the lepra bacillus")	December 28, 1865 Ovchukhi, Vladimir Governorate, Russian Empire	December 4, 1937 Moscow, Russia	1933	Nominated by M.M. Neviadomski (1883–1969) the only time
	Albrecht Eduard Bernhard Nocht (Note: "Work on treatment of malaria with quinine and plasmoquinine; work on beri-beri")	November 4, 1857 Landeshut in Niederschlesien, Kingdom of Prussia, German Confederation	June 5, 1945 Wiesbaden, Germany	1933	Nominated by K.Ad.Poppe the only time
	Themistocles Gluck (Note: "Work on transplantations")	November 30, 1853 Iaşi, Moldavia	April 25, 1942 Berlin, Nazi Germany	1933	
	Wilhelm His Jr. (Note: "Work on transplantations")	December 29, 1863 Basel, Switzerland	November 10, 1934 Brombach near Lörrach, Nazi Germany	1933	Nominated by Fr.Külbs the only time
	Karl Wittmaack (Note: "Work on the normal and pathological pneumatization of the temporal bone and the relations to diseases in the middle ear")	January 17, 1876 Berlin, German Empire	January 28, 1972 Garmisch-Partenkirchen, Germany	1933, 1934	Nominated by Otto Fr.Steurer only
	Frits Warmolt Went	May 18, 1903 Utrecht, Netherlands	May 1, 1990 Little Valley, United States	1933	Nominated jointly (Note: "Work on auxines") with Fr.Kögl by Otto H.Warburg the only time
	Fritz Kögl (Note: "Work on tumors and on plant hormones")	September 19, 1897 Munich, German Empire	June 6, 1959 Utrecht, Netherlands	1933, 1940, 1941	Nominated for the Nobel Prize in Chemistry too
	Friedrich Hermann Rein (Note: "Work on blood distribution in higher organisms")	February 22, 1867 Mitwitz, Kingdom of Bavaria	January 15, 1959 Göttingen, Germany	1933, 1936, 1937, 1938, 1944, 1951, 1952	
1934
	Albert Imre Szent-Györgyi de Nagyrápolt (Note: "Work on hexurone acid and vitamin C")	September 16, 1893 Budapest, Austria-Hungary	October 22, 1986 Woods Hole, Massachusetts, United States	1934, 1935, 1936, 1937, 1951	Won the 1937 Nobel Prize in Physiology or Medicine (Note: “for his discoveries in connection with the biological combustion processes, with special reference to vitamin C and the catalysis of fumaric acid”)
	Corneille Heymans (Note: "Work on the regulation of respiration and blood circulation")	March 28, 1892 Ghent, Belgium	July 18, 1968 Knokke, Belgium	1934, 1936, 1938, 1939, 1940	Won the 1938 Nobel Prize in Physiology or Medicine (Note: “for the discovery of the role played by the sinus and aortic mechanisms in the regulation of respiration”) a year later
	Samuel Alexander Kinnier Wilson (Note: "Work on Wilson´s disease")	December 6, 1878 Cedarville, New Jersey, United States	May 12, 1937 London, England	1934	Nominated by L.Benedek the only time
	James Lionel Alloway, II (Note: "Work on the change of the antigene effect in bacteria")	January 15, 1900 Columbus, Ohio, United States	February 7, 1954 Tucson, Arizona, United States	1934	Nominated by Wilfred Hamilton Manwaring (14.9.1871 Ashland – 19.6.1960) the only time
	Philip Bardwell Hadley (Note: "Work on bacteria dissociation")	January 10, 1881 Shelburne Falls, Massachusetts, United States	December 8, 1963 Cedarville, United States	1934	Nominated by Wilfred Hamilton Manwaring (14.9.1871 Ashland – 19.6.1960) the only time
	André de Coulon	April 10, 1890 Neuchâtel, Switzerland	September 24, 1935 Neuchâtel, Switzerland	1934	Nominated jointly (Note: "Work on treatment of neoplasms by changing the physico-chemical environment") by L.C.Maillard the only time
	Fred Manuel Raoul Vlès	January 22, 1885 Le Havre, France	July 2, 1944 Dachau, Nazi Germany	1934	Nominated jointly by L.C.Maillard the only time
	Petr Lazarev (Note: "Work on the use of biophysics in medicine")	April 14, 1878 Moscow, Russian Empire	April 24, 1942 Almaty, Kazakhstan	1934	Nominated by G Belonovski the only time
	Robert William Philip (Note: "Promotion of a schema for the prevention of tuberculosis")	December 29, 1857 Govan, Scotland	April 24, 1942 Edinburgh, Scotland	1934	Nominated by John Robertson (8.10.1862 Warminster - 16.12.1936 The Hollies on Court Oak Road) the only time
	Antônio Cardoso Fontes (Note: "Work on the ultravirus of the tubercle bacillus")	October 6, 1879 Petrópolis, Brazil	March 27, 1943 Rio de Janeiro, Brazil	1934	Nominated with G.Ramon by M.Weinberg the only time
	Emile - André Tournade (Note: "Work on the physiology of the adrenal glands")	January 12, 1881 La Rochelle, France	September 21, 1942 Paris, France	1934	
	Enrique Fedrico Mauricio Paschen (Note: "Work on variola (smallpox) virus")	December 30, 1860 Tacubaya, Mexico	October 22, 1936 Hamburg, Nazi Germany	1934	
	Pierre Masson (Note: "Work on histological dyeing methods, on naevi pigmentosi and carcinogens")	November 12, 1880 Dijon, France	May 11, 1959 Montreal, Canada	1934	Nominated by Eber Landau the only time
	Alexander von Lichtenberg (Note: "The invention and development of drugs for intravenous urography")	January 20, 1880 Budapest, Kingdom of Hungary, Austria-Hungary	April 21, 1949 Mexico City, Mexico	1934	Nominated by Ralph Michael LeComte (19.2.1888 Butler - 11.3.1954 Washington, D.C.) the only time
	William Alanson White (Note: "Research studies in psychiatry, especially work in mental hygiene")	January 24, 1870 Brooklyn, United States	March 7, 1937 Washington, D.C., United States	1934	Nominated by Frank Frazier Hutchins (Indianapolis: 9.2.1870-22.9.1942) the only time
	Giovanni Vitali (Note: "Work on the paratympanic organ")	April 15, 1876 Foiano della Chiana, Kingdom of Italy	August 22, 1963 Pisa, Italy	1934	
	Torsten Johansson Hellman (Note: "Work on lymphatic organs")	April 3, 1878 Skara Municipality, Sweden	December 14, 1944 Lund Municipality, Sweden	1934	
	Aleksei Bach (Note: "for work on oxidation and reduction processes in the living organism")	March 17, 1857 Zolotonosha, Poltava Governorate, Russian Empire	May 13, 1946 Moscow, Russia	1934	Nominated with L.Éd.Lapicque and C.Al.Neuberg by L.S.Stern the only time
	Karl Friedrich Schönhöfer	January 1, 1892 Speyer, German Empire	February 11, 1965 Wuppertal, Germany	1934	Nominated jointly (Note: "Work on plasmoquinine") with W.Schulemann by G. Giemsa the only time
	August Wingler	August 14, 1898 Konstanz, German Empire	1960	1934	Nominated jointly with W.Schulemann by G. Giemsa the only time
	Werner Schulemann (Note: "Work on plasmoquinine and atebrin")	May 4, 1888 Neisse, German Empire	June 20, 1975 Bonn, Germany	1934, 1935	Nominated for the Nobel Prize in Chemistry too
	Leon Orbeli (Note: "Work on the role of the sympathetic nervous system in the animal organism")	July 7, 1882 Tsaghkadzor, Tiflis Governorate, Russian Empire	December 9, 1958 Leningrad, Russia	1934, 1935	
	Walter Dandy (Note: "The introduction of ventriculography and encephalography and work on the circulation of the cerebrospinal fluid")	April 6, 1886 Sedalia, Missouri, United States	April 19, 1946 Baltimore, United States	1934, 1936	
	Grafton Elliot Smith (Note: "Work on neopallium")	August 15, 1871 Grafton, New South Wales, Australia	January 1, 1937 Broadstairs, England	1934, 1936	
	Alexei Dmitrijewitsch Speranski (Note: "Work on the trophic function of the nervous system and its role on disease")	January 11, 1888 Urzhum, Vyatka Governorate, Russian Empire	July 23, 1961 Moscow, Russia	1934, 1936, 1937, 1942	
	Edgar Allen (Note: "The discovery and demonstration of ovogenesis from the germinal epithelium in the adult mammal, and of the follicular hormone")	May 2, 1892 Cañon City, Colorado, United States	February 3, 1943 New Haven, Connecticut, United States	1934, 1936, 1938, 1940	
	František Karel Studnička (Note: "Work on the substance of tissues")	November 25, 1870 Prague, Austria-Hungary	August 2, 1955 Prague, Czechia	1934, 1953	
	Philip Edward Smith (Note: "Work on hypophysectomy")	January 1, 1884 De Smet, South Dakota, United States	December 8, 1970 Florence, Massachusetts, United States	1934, 1935, 1953, 1955	
1935
	Joseph Erlanger (Note: "Introduction of the cathode ray oscillograph, work on the physiology of the peripheral and central nervous systems")	January 5, 1874 San Francisco, United States	December 5, 1965 St. Louis, Missouri, United States	1935, 1936, 1937, 1939, 1940, 1941, 1942, 1943, 1944, 1945	Shared the 1944 Nobel Prize in Physiology or Medicine (Note: “for their discoveries relating to the highly differentiated functions of single nerve fibres”)
	Herbert Spencer Gasser (Note: "Work on a technique using the cathode ray oscillograph for the investigation of electric potential changes in nerve tissue")	July 5, 1888 Platteville, Wisconsin, United States	May 11, 1963 New York City, United States	1935, 1936, 1937, 1939, 1940, 1941, 1942, 1943, 1944, 1945	Shared the 1944 Nobel Prize in Physiology or Medicine
	Adolf Butenandt (Note: "Work on the physiology, chemistry and biology of sex hormones")	March 24, 1903 Lehe, German Empire	January 18, 1995 Munich, Germany	1935, 1936, 1940	Shared the 1939 Nobel Prize in Chemistry (Note: “for his work on sex hormones”) with L.Ružička
	Richard Bruynoghe (Note: "Work on bacteriophagy, the chemistry of antigenes, the effect of radium on microbes, parasitology, vaccination against meningococci")	November 4, 1881 Alveringem, Belgium	March 26, 1957 Leuven, Belgium	1935	Nominated by Al.M.Besredka the only time
	Alf Vilhelm A:son Westergren	December 17, 1891 Stockholm, Sweden	December 15, 1968 Stockholm, Sweden	1935	Nominated jointly (Note: "Work on the blood sedimentation reaction") with R.S.Fåhræus by Östen Holsti the only time
	Wu Lien-teh (Note: "Work on Pneumonic Plague and especially the discovery of the role played by the Tarbagan in its transmission")	March 10, 1879 Penang, Straits Settlements, British Empire	January 21, 1960 Penang, Federation of Malaya	1935	Nominated by W.W.Cadbury the only time
	Albert-Pierre-Jean Dustin (Note: "The introduction of experimental methods in histology and pathology, investigation of cell-division and thymus")	December 12, 1884	October 29, 1942	1935	Nominated by Eber Landau the only time
	Joseph Francis McCarthy (Note: "Work on the diagnosis of and operation on the prostate gland")	June 12, 1874 Yonkers, New York, United States	January 21, 1965	1935	Nominated by Robert Harry Herbst (1877 - 15.5.1951 Highland Park, Illinois) the only time
	Charles Halliley Kellaway (Note: "Work on physiology and immunity, the diagnosis of human hydatid and investigations on the Australian snake venoms")	January 16, 1889 Melbourne, Australia	December 13, 1952 London, England	1935	Nominated by H.Sutton the only time
	John Albert Kolmer (Note: "Work on vaccination against acute anterior poliomyelitis")	April 24, 1886 Lonaconing, Maryland, United States	December 11, 1962 Philadelphia, Pennsylvania, United States	1935	Nominated by Frederick Todd “Fred” Cadham (Winnipeg: 9.2.1880-29.1.1961) the only time
	Joseph Louis Svirbely	August 6, 1906 Duquesne, Pennsylvania, United States	1995	1935	Nominated jointly (Note: "for work on vitamin C") with Alb.Szent-Györgyi by professor of biochemistry Guillermo Víctor Stuckert (23.1.1889 Córdoba - after 1955) from the National University of Córdoba the only time
	Chevalier Quixote Jackson (Note: "Work on bronchoscopy, laryngology, esophagoscopy and gastroscopy")	November 4, 1865 Pittsburgh, Pennsylvania, United States	August 16, 1958 Philadelphia, Pennsylvania, United States	1935, 1939	
	Takaoki Sasaki (Note: "Work on the production of tumors with chemical substances")	May 5, 1878 Tokyo, Japan	October 31, 1966 Tokyo, Japan	1935, 1936, 1939, 1941	
	William Bosworth Castle (Note: "Work on the pathogenesis of pernicious anaemia")	October 21, 1897 Cambridge, Massachusetts, United States	August 9, 1990 Brookline, Massachusetts, United States	1935, 1938, 1955	
	Andrew Conway Ivy (Note: "Work on the humoral mechanism for gastric secretion, histamine, the mechanism of secretin, the discovery of cholecystokinin")	February 25, 1893 Farmington, Missouri, United States	February 7, 1978 Oak Park, Illinois, United States	1935, 1950, 1956	
1936
	Axel Hugo Theodor Theorell (Note: "Work on the yellow ferment, especially its resynthesis")	July 6, 1903 Linköping, Sweden	August 15, 1982 Stockholm, Sweden	1936, 1939, 1945, 1953, 1955	Won the 1955 Nobel Prize in Physiology or Medicine (Note: “for his discoveries concerning the nature and mode of action of oxidation enzymes”) and nominated for the Nobel Prize in Chemistry too
	Jean Henri DeMoor	April 25, 1867 Etterbeek, Belgium	April 26, 1941 Brussels, Belgium	1936	Nominated jointly (Note: "Work on humoral transmission of nervous impulses to tissues") with Otto Loewi by Robert John Stewart McDowall (1892–1990) the only time
	Isidor Clinton Rubin (Note: "The development of a clinical ambulatory method for determining patency or non-patency of the fallopian tubes (the "Rubin test")")	January 8, 1883 Vienna, Austria-Hungary	July 10, 1958 London, England	1936	Nominated by Ira I. Kaplan (11.10.1887 New York City - 15.3.1963) the only time
	George Washington Corner (Note: "Work on the endocrine secretion of the ovary")	December 12, 1889 Baltimore, United States	September 28, 1981 Huntsville, Alabama, United States	1936	Nominated with Frank Charles Mann by G.H.Whipple the only time
	Koichi Ichikawa	1888 Amabikimura, Ibaraki Prefecture, Japan	1948	1936	Nominated jointly (Note: "Work on the production of tumors with chemical substances") with T.Sasaki and K.Yamagiwa by R.Kimura the only time
	Charles Albert Elsberg (Note: "Work on the sense of smell, particularly in its relation to the diagnosis of brain tumors and other lesions of the brain")	August 24, 1871 New York City, United States	1948	1936	Nominated by Frederick Tilney the only time
	Hermann Hubert Knaus (Note: "Work on the periodic fertility and infertility of the woman")	October 19, 1892 Sankt Veit an der Glan, Austria-Hungary	August 22, 1970 Graz, Austria	1936	Nominated with Fr.H.Rein by W.Nonnenbruch the only time
	Francis Carter Wood (Note: "Work in cancer research")	December 30, 1869 Columbus, Ohio, United States	January 5, 1951	1936	Nominated by Rudolf Carl Robert Denig (8.12.1867 Grünstadt - 22.7.1960) the only time
	Nils Herman Nilsson-Ehle (Note: "Work on inheritance of quantitative traits, plant genetics and the effect of radiation on genetic traits")	February 12, 1873 Skurup, Sweden	December 29, 1949 Lund, Sweden	1936	
	Victor Veau (Note: "Work on the treatment and cure of harelip with plastic surgery")	December 8, 1871 Glogau, German Empire	May 16, 1949	1936	Nominated by Bernhard Mayrhofer (21.1.1868–1.8.1938) the only time
	Allan Roy Dafoe (Note: "for excellence in the practice of obstetrics; delivery of quintuplets in a country place far removed from expert assistance")	May 29, 1883 Madoc, Canada	June 2, 1943 North Bay, Ontario, Canada	1936	Nominated by Hugh Alister McGuigan (29.3.1874 Lisnoe - 1964 Evanston) the only time
	Sir Patrick Playfair Laidlaw (Note: "The discovery that human influenza is due to a filtrable virus, and that the disease can be transmitted to, and studied in, ferrets and mice")	September 26, 1881 Glasgow, Scotland	March 20, 1940 London, England	1936, 1937	
	Selig Hecht (Note: "The discovery of the photochemical and chemical basis of the visual processes")	1892 Glogau, German Empire	1947	1936	Nominated with Th.M.Rivers by Bret Ratner (25.4.1893 Brooklyn, New York City - 11.10.1957) the only time
	Thomas Milton Rivers (Note: "His influence in directing the trend of research in the field of viruses and his introduction of the use of live media for the study of viruses")	September 3, 1888 Jonesboro, Georgia, United States	May 12, 1962 Forest Hills, Queens, New York, United States	1936, 1939	
	Robert Doerr (Note: "Work on allergic reactions in human and animals")	November 1, 1871 Técső, Kingdom of Hungary	January 6, 1952 Basel, Switzerland	1936, 1943	
	Antoine Lacassagne (Note: "Work on the effect of endocrine secretion on the inducement of experimental cancer")	August 29, 1884 Villerest, France	December 16, 1971 Paris, France	1936, 1953	
	Gregory Shwartzman (Note: "Work on skin reactivity")	May 26, 1896 Odesa, Russian Empire	July 25, 1965 New York City, United States	1936, 1953	
	James Wilfred Cook (Note: "Work on the isolation of chemical carcinogenic agents from tar and studies on the relation between chemical constitution and carcinogenic activity")	December 10, 1900 London, England	October 21, 1975 Exeter, England	1936, 1937, 1941, 1942	Nominated jointly with Ern.Kennaway mainly and for the Nobel Prize in Chemistry too
	Ernest Kennaway (Note: "Isolation of carcinogenic compounds in pure form")	May 23, 1881 Exeter, England	January 1, 1958 St Bartholomew's Hospital, London, England	1936, 1937, 1941, 1942, 1946, 1951, 1953, 1954, 1956	Nominated for the Nobel Prize in Chemistry too
	Kuno Yasu (Note: "Work on the physiology of human perspiration")	March 30, 1882 Nagoya, Japan	December 30, 1977	1936, 1938, 1953, 1956	
	Robert Thomson Leiper (Note: "The discoveries on the etiology of Bilharzia disease, due to the parasite Schistosoma haematobium")	April 17, 1881 Witch Road, Kilmarnock, Scotland	May 21, 1969	1936, 1956	
1937
	Izrael Hieger	June 13, 1901 Siedlce, Siedlce Governorate, Russian Empire	October 14, 1986	1937, 1942	Nominated jointly (Note: "Work on the isolation of chemical carcinogenic agents from tar and studies on the relation between chemical constitution and carcinogenic activity") with J.W.Cook and Ern.Kennaway only
	William Valentine Mayneord	February 14, 1902 Redditch, Worcestershire, England	August 10, 1988	1937, 1942	Nominated jointly with J.W.Cook and Ern.Kennaway only
	Max Theiler (Note: "Work on the action of yellow fever virus on mice")	January 30, 1899 Pretoria, South African Republic	August 11, 1972 New Haven, Connecticut, United States	1937, 1948, 1950, 1951	Won the 1951 Nobel Prize in Physiology or Medicine (Note: “for his discoveries concerning yellow fever and how to combat it”)
	Wendell Meredith Stanley (Note: "Work on the virus of tobacco mosaic disease")	August 16, 1904 Ridgeville, Indiana, United States	June 15, 1971 Salamanca, Spain	1937, 1938, 1939, 1940, 1941, 1942, 1943, 1944, 1946, 1947	Shared the 1946 Nobel Prize in Chemistry with J.B.Sumner and jointly (Note: “for their preparation of enzymes and virus proteins in a pure form”) with J.H.Northrop
	Moses Kunitz (Note: "The production of crystalline digestion ferment (enzyme)")	December 19, 1887 Slonim, Grodno Governorate, Russian Empire	April 21, 1978 Philadelphia, United States	1937	Nominated for the Nobel Prize in Chemistry too
	Auguste Lumière (Note: "Work on the colloid state in sickness and in health")	19 October 1862 Besançon, France	10 April 1954 Bandol, France	1937	Nominated for the Nobel Prize in Physics too
	Hans Karl Gustav Schmidt	February 20, 1886 Höchst am Main, German Empire	April 20, 1959 Wuppertal-Elberfeld, Germany	1937	Nominated jointly (Note: "Work on chemotherapy (antimony compounds used against certain tropical diseases)") with P.Th.Uhlenhuth only
	Robert Tilden Frank (Note: "Work on the female sex hormones")	May 11, 1875 New York City, United States	October 15, 1949 New York City, United States	1937	Nominated by A.D.Hirschfelder the only time
	Henri Coutard	August 27, 1876 Marolles-les-Braults, France	March 16, 1950 Le Mans, France	1937	Nominated jointly (Note: "Work on the use of X-rays in cancer therapy") with Cl.Regaud only
	Francis Hoeffer McMechan (Note: "Work on anesthesia")	January 16, 1879 Cincinnati, United States	June 29, 1939 Cleveland, United States	1937	Nominated by Marion Sylvester Dooley (23.12.1879 Cedar Grove - 1958) the only time
	George Oswald Burr	October 6, 1896 Conway, Arkansas, United States	1992 Honolulu, Hawaii, United States	1937	Nominated jointly (Note: "Work on vegetable fats in nutrition (linolic and linoleic acids) and Vitamine E") with H.McL.Evans by J.Fr.McClendon the only time
	René Chevallier (Note: "Work on gastric allergies")	?	?	1937	Nominated by Jean Marie Paviot (Lyon: 14.11.1866-13.12.1944) the only time
	Ralph Robinson Parker	February 23, 1888 Malden, Massachusetts, United States	September 4, 1949 Hamilton, Montana, United States	1937	Nominated jointly (Note: "Work on immunization against the American typhus fever ("Rocky Mountain spotted fever")") by H.Beitzke the only time
	Roscoe Roy Spencer	July 28, 1888 King William County, Virginia, United States	January 10, 1982 Lynchburg, Virginia, United States	1937	Nominated jointly by H.Beitzke the only time
	William Burridge (Note: "Work on natural stimulation and excitability")	July 1, 1885	April 21, 1955 Dartford, England	1937	Nominated by Gladys Helen Marchant (21.9.1891 Calcutta - 1969) the only time
	Félix Augustin Dévé (Note: "Work on echinococcus diseases")	November 10, 1872 Beauvais, France	September 1, 1951 Paris, France	1937	Nominated by Marcel Virgile Chaton (17.7.1881 Bracon - 1955) the only time
	Alexandre Joseph Émile Brumpt (Note: "Numeral works on parasitology")	March 10, 1877 Paris, France	July 8, 1951 Paris, France	1937	Nominated by Jean Jérome Augustin Bussière (1872–25.10.1958) the only time
	Fred (Friedrich) Neufeld (Note: "Work on serologically different types of pneumococcus")	February 17, 1869 Danzig, Kingdom of Prussia, North German Confederation	April 18, 1945 Berlin, Nazi Germany	1937	
	Ferdinand-Jean (János) Darier (Note: "Work on skin diseases")	April 26, 1856 Pest, Kingdom of Hungary	June 4, 1938 Longpont-sur-Orge, France	1937	Nominated by L.S.Nékám the only time
	Max Askanazy (Note: "Work on the hematopoietic apparatus, the endocrine glands, animal parasites, and the etiology of cancer")	February 24, 1865 Stallupönen, Province of Prussia	October 23, 1940 Geneva, Switzerland	1937	Nominated by Albert-Rene Jentzer (18.5.1886 Plainpalais - 1964) the only time
	Nikolay Nikolayevich Anichkov (Note: "Work on the experimental production of arteroschlerosis")	November 3, 1885 Saint Petersburg, Russian Empire	December 7, 1964 Leningrad, Russia	1937	Nominated by P.Nolf the only time
	Charles Horace Mayo (Note: "Work on surgery of the thyroid")	July 19, 1865 Rochester, Minnesota, United States	May 26, 1939 Chicago, United States	1937	Nominated with his brother W.J.Mayo only
	Maurice Favre	May 18, 1876 Les Rousses, France	December 16, 1954 Lyon, France	1937 (Note: "Work on lymphogranuloma inguinale")	
	Joseph Nicolas	August 11, 1868 Lyon, France	September 20, 1960 Cannes, France	1937	Nominated jointly with M.Favre by F.Arloing the only time
	Russell LaFayette Cecil (Note: "for investigations in the serum treatment of different forms of pneumonia and investigations in the field of infectious arthritis")	1881	June 1, 1965	1937	Nominated by clinical professor of diseases of children Gayles W. Graves from the New York University the only time
	Carl Gustaf "Gösta" Abrahamsson Forssell (Note: "Work on the mucous membrane of the gastro-intestinal tract and its physiology")	March 2, 1876 Vassbo, Kopparbergs län, Sweden	November 13, 1950 Danderyd Municipality, Sweden	1937, 1939, 1940, 1941, 1945	
	Nicola Pende (Note: "Work on endocrinology")	April 21, 1880 Noicattaro, Kingdom of Italy	June 8, 1970 Rome, Italy	1937, 1943, 1951	
	Ernest William Goodpasture (Note: "Work on fiterable virus and the discovery that certain types of bateria go through an early parasitic stage of development within certain cells of the body")	October 17, 1886 Clarksville, Tennessee, United States	September 20, 1960 Nashville, United States	1937, 1942, 1945, 1948, 1949, 1951, 1952, 1953	
	Hans Christian Hagedorn (Note: "Work on and discovery of protamine insulinate")	March 6, 1888 Copenhagen, Denmark	October 6, 1971 Gentofte, Denmark	1937, 1954	
	Michael Heidelberger (Note: "Methods for measuring antigens, antibody and complement. Specifically, studies on the purification of Pneumococcus polysaccharides, leading to routines for immunization against pneumococcal pneumonia")	April 29, 1888 New York City, United States	June 25, 1991 New York City, United States	1937, 1938, 1939, 1942, 1946, 1947, 1948, 1949, 1950, 1951, 1952, 1953, 1955, 1956	Nominated for the Nobel Prize in Chemistry too
1938
	Gerhard Johannes Paul Domagk (Note: "Discovery of Prontosil")	October 30, 1895 Lagow, German Empire	April 24, 1964 Burgberg, Germany	1938, 1939, 1940, 1951, 1952, 1953	Won the 1939 Nobel Prize in Physiology or Medicine (Note: “for the discovery of the antibacterial effects of prontosil”)
	Perrin Hamilton Long (Note: "Work on the treatment of streptococcus hemolyticus infections by the use of sulfanilamide")	April 7, 1899 Bryan, Ohio, United States	December 17, 1965 Edgartown, Massachusetts, United States	1938	Nominated by George W. Raiziss the only time: P.H.Long - with G.J.P.Domagk and Ph.Levene; Fr.Nitti - jointly (Note: "The discovery of the facts relating to para-amino-benzene sulfonamide") with J.Tréfouël
	Frédéric Nitti	September 20, 1903 Ischia, Campania, Kingdom of Italy	March 2, 1947 Rome, Italy	1938	Nominated by George W. Raiziss the only time: P.H.Long - with G.J.P.Domagk and Ph.Levene; Fr.Nitti - jointly with J.Tréfouël
	Jacques Tréfouël (Note: "Studies on stovarsol, germanin and discovery of the antimicrobial action of sulfonamides (sulfa drugs)")	November 9, 1897 Le Raincy, France	July 11, 1977 Paris, France	1938, 1948, 1955	Nominated for the Nobel Prize in Chemistry too
	Magnus John Karl August Forssman (Note: "Work on heterogenous antigenes")	November 22, 1868 Kalmar, Sweden	March 12, 1947 Lund, Sweden	1938	Nominated by R.Bruynoghe the only time
	Leonard George Rowntree (Note: "Work on the thymus gland and the experimental production of tumours in rats")	April 10, 1883 London, Ontario, Canada	June 2, 1959 Miami Beach, Florida, United States	1938	
	Carlo Ceni (Note: "Work on the psychic and organic life and the role of the vegetative centras")	May 15, 1866 Brignano Gera d'Adda, Kingdom of Italy	March 13, 1965 Bologna, Italy	1938	
	Albert Louis Brown (Note: "Work on the original and clinical investigations of the etiology and treatment of intraocular inflammation, especially iritis and uveitis")	February 27, 1899 Cincinnati, Ohio, United States	June 10, 1963	1938	Nominated by Sidney Lange the only time
	Louis Aryah Lurie (Note: "Work on the medical approach, classification and treatment of abnormal child behavior and child psychiatry")	February 10, 1886 Salant, Kovno Governorate, Russian Empire	after 1959	1938	Nominated by Sidney Lange the only time
	Adolfo Lutz (Note: "Work on tropical diseases (lepra, sporotrichos, yellow fever, malaria) and their transmission")	December 18, 1855 Rio de Janeiro, Empire of Brazil	October 6, 1940 Rio de Janeiro, Brazil	1938	Nominated by Octavio Magalhaes the only time
	Frank Alexander Hartman (Note: "The demonstration of the presence in the adrenal cortex of a substance necessary to life and extraction of the same")	December 4, 1883 Gibbon, Nebraska, United States	March 21, 1971 Columbus, Ohio, United States	1938	Nominated by David Andrew Tucker Jr. (21.12.1890 near Greensburg - 3.6.1958 Cincinnati) the only time
	Erik Matteo Prochet Widmark (Note: "Work on the alcohol metabolism in the organism")	June 13, 1889 Helsingborg, Sweden	April 30, 1945	1938	Nominated by W.Schwarzacher the only time
	Anton Freiherr von Eiselsberg (Note: "Work on the thyroid gland and brain surgery, especially the hypophysis")	July 31, 1860 Schloss Steinhaus, Austrian Empire, German Confederation	October 25, 1939 St. Valentin, Lower Austria, Nazi Germany	1938	
	Theodor Christian Brun Frølich (Note: "Work on experimentally induced scurvy and Vitamin C")	September 29, 1870 Kristiania, Norway	August 14, 1947 Oslo, Norway	1938	Nominated by J.M.Holst (Note: Additional nominators are: E. Langfeldt, prof physiological chemistry, C. Schötz, prof hygiene, O.L Mohr, prof anatomy, K. Schreiner, prof anatomy, Fr. Leegaard, prof physiology, K. Hansen, prof pharmacology, R. Ingebrigtsen, prof surgery, A. Sunde, prof obstetrics and gynecology, S. Hagen, prof ophthalmiatric, L. Kreyberg, prof pathologic anatomy, N. Danbolt, prof dermathology and syphilidology, F. Leegaard, prof , T Thjötta, prof bacteriology, O. Hanssen, prof medicine, H.A. Salvesen, prof medicine, all in Oslo, NO) the only time
	Bun-ichi Hasama (Note: "Work on changes in the electropotential of active endocrine glands")	1898 Ōita, Japan	January, 1946 Fukuoka, Japan	1938	Nominated with Al.G.Gurwitsch and Al.L.von Muralt by Albr.J.Th.Bethe the only time
	Erich Walther von Holst (Note: "Work on coordination and plasticity within the central nervous system")	November 28, 1908 Riga, Governorate of Livonia, Russian Empire	May 26, 1962 Herrsching am Ammersee, Germany	1938	Nominated with Al.G.Gurwitsch and Al.L.von Muralt by Albr.J.Th.Bethe the only time
	Alexander Ludwig von Muralt (Note: "Work on the optical state of muscles, especially an action substance in the nerve")	August 19, 1903 Zürich, Switzerland	May 28, 1990 Arni, Bern, Switzerland	1938, 1950	
	Francesco Pentimalli (Note: "Work on malignant tumours")	November 28, 1885 Palmi, Calabria, Kingdom of Italy	April 26, 1958 Rome, Italy	1938, 1942	
	Edward Carl Rosenow (Note: "Fundamental contribution to the Theory of Disease; Established the streptococcal nature of poliomyelitis infection, and studied the conversion/reversion of this streptococcus into virus form; in vitro synthesis of antibodies to the poliomyelitis antigen; studies of streptococci from epilectic patients")	July 14, 1875 Fountain City or Alma, Wisconsin, United States	March 7, 1966 Minneapolis, United States	1938, 1948	Nominated by M.H.Fischer only
	Harry Goldblatt (Note: "The discovery that the production of renal ischaemia results in a permanent hypertension")	March 14, 1891 Muscatine, Iowa, United States	January 6, 1977 Cleveland, United States	1938, 1940, 1941, 1942, 1943, 1944, 1947, 1948, 1950, 1955	
	Manfred Joshua Sakel (Note: "Work on treatment of schizophrenia with insulin")	June 6, 1900 Nadwirna, Austria-Hungary	December 2, 1957 New York, United States	1938, 1940, 1943, 1950, 1951, 1952, 1953, 1955	
	Ralph Walter Graystone Wyckoff, Sr. (Note: "Work in the preparation of unstable cell constituents, such as viruses, enzymes and antibodies")	August 9, 1897 Geneva, New York, United States	November 3, 1994 Tucson, Arizona, United States	1938, 1948, 1955	Nominated for the Nobel Prize in Chemistry too
1939
	London, Efim Semjonovich (Note: "Proposed the methods of angiostomy and organostomy")	January 9, 1869 Kalvarija, Lithuania, Russian Empire	March 21, 1939 Leningrad, Russia	1930, 1934, 1939	Died before the only chance to be rewarded
	Charles Dhéré (Note: "The work "La fluorescence en biologie"")	March 5, 1876 Paris, France	January 18, 1955 Geneva, Switzerland	1939	Nominated with W.R.Hess and Ax.H.Th.Theorell by H.Zangger the only time
	Hendrik Gerard Bungenberg de Jong (Note: "Work on coacervates")	May 27, 1893 The Hague, Netherlands	May 7, 1977 Arnhem, Netherlands	1939	Nominated by Aemilius Bernardus Droogleever Fortuyn (7.11.1886 Rotterdam - 13.8.1970 Utrecht) the only time
	Makoto Ishihara (Note: "Work on "Heart-Action"")	May 18, 1879 Itami, Japan	December 11, 1938	1939	Nominated posthumously by Daize Ogata the only time
	Noel Joseph Terence Montgomery Needham (Note: "Work on biological microchemistry, especially the work "Chemical Embryology"")	December 9, 1900 London, England	March 24, 1995 Cambridge, England	1939	Nominated for the Nobel Peace Prize too
	Frederick Charles Bawden	August 18, 1908 North Tawton, England	February 8, 1972 Harpenden, England	1939	Jointly (Note: "Work on production of plant disease generating virus in crystallized form") nominated only including for the Nobel Peace in Chemistry too
	Norman Wingate Pirie	July 1, 1907 Easebourne, England	March 29, 1997 Harpenden, England	1939	Jointly nominated only including for the Nobel Peace in Chemistry too
	Gustave Roussy (Note: "Discovery of the function of the centras in tuber cinereum and the hypothalamus")	November 24, 1874 Vevey, Switzerland	September 30, 1948 Paris, France	1939	Nominated with P.A.Bouin and L.Éd.Lapicque by C.Cordier the only time
	Leo Loeb (Note: "Work on cultivation of tissues outside of the body, tissue transplantation, endocrinology and cancer")	September 21, 1869 Mayen, Kingdom of Prussia, North German Confederation	December 28, 1959 St. Louis, United States	1939	Nominated by Edmund Vincent Cowdry (18.7.1888 Fort Macleod - 25.6.1975 St. Louis) the only time
	Riuso Torikata (Note: "Work on the theory of Coctoantigen (Coctoimmunogen and Impedin-phenomenon), which is the basis and method for the reform of active immunization or vaccine therapy")	August 20, 1877 Hakodate, Japan	February 19, 1952 Osaka, Japan	1939	Nominated by Kohei Koyano the only time
	Rudolf Spanner (Note: "Work on the physiology of the kidneys")	April 17, 1895 Metternich bei Koblenz, German Empire	August 31, 1960 Cologne, Germany	1939	Nominated with Quinto Calabro by Pr.Dorello the only time
	Quinto Calabro (Note: "Work on the humoral transmission of nervous impulses")	1905	1987	1939	Nominated by Pr.Dorello and Osv.Polimanti only
	Norman Hayhurst Jolliffe	August 18, 1901 Knob Fork, West Virginia, United States	August 1, 1961 New York, United States	1939 (Note: "Work on the use of nicotinic acid in pellagra therapy")	Nominated by Pr.Dorello and Osv.Polimanti only
	Thomas Hughes Jukes	August 26, 1906 Hastings, England	November 1, 1999	1939	Nominated by Pr.Dorello and Osv.Polimanti only
	Samuel Lepkovsky	November 15 (or February), 1899	April 12, 1984 Oakland, California, United States	1939	Nominated by Pr.Dorello and Osv.Polimanti only
	Marion Arthur Blankenhorn	November 13, 1885 Orrville, Ohio, United States	September 3, 1957 Cincinnati, United States	1939	Nominated by Pr.Dorello and Osv.Polimanti only
	Clark Neil (Niel) Cooper	December 26, 1904 Villisca, Iowa, United States	April 7, 1973 Naples, Florida, United States	1939	Nominated by Pr.Dorello and Osv.Polimanti only
	Paul Jones Fouts	June 15, 1905 Centerville, Indiana, United States	September 5, 1973 Marion, Indiana, United States	1939	Nominated by Pr.Dorello and Osv.Polimanti only
	Tom Douglas Spies	September 21, 1902 Ravenna, Texas, United States	February 28, 1960 New York, United States	1939	Nominated by Pr.Dorello and Osv.Polimanti only
	Virgil Preston Willis Sydenstricker	July 15, 1889 Hamilton, Missouri, United States	December 12, 1964 Augusta, Georgia, United States	1939	Nominated by Pr.Dorello and Osv.Polimanti only
	Julian Meade Ruffin	Aug. 26, 1900 Norfolk, Virginia, United States	Dec. 31, 1978 Orange County, North Carolina, United States	1939	Nominated by Osv.Polimanti the only time
	David Tillerson Smith	October 1, 1898 near Lebanon, Anderson County, South Carolina, United States	January 20, 1981 Little Rock, Arkansas, United States	1939	Nominated by Osv.Polimanti the only time
	Susan Gower Smith	December 9, 1895 Greenville County, South Carolina, United States	October 3, 1983 Little Rock, Arkansas, United States	1939	Nominated by Osv.Polimanti the only time
	Frank Morgan Strong	December 26, 1908 Alpine, New York, United States	1993	1939, 1940	(Note: "Work on the use of nicotinic acid on "blacktongue"")
	Robert James Madden			1939, 1940	(Note: "Work on the use of nicotinic acid on "blacktongue"")
	May Mellanby	May 1, 1882 London, England	March 5, 1978	1939	Nominated jointly (Note: "Work on the relation of dietary deficiencies to human diseases. (Sir E. Mellanby: Rickets and the nervous conditions produced by lack of vitamin A. Lady M. Mellanby: Dental structure and dental disease.)") with her husband Edw.Mellanby only
	Edward Mellanby (Note: "Work on dietary deficiencies, rickets and the nervous conditions produced by lack of vitamin A")	April 8, 1884 West Hartlepool, England	January 30, 1955	1939, 1947	
	Conrad Arnold Elvehjem (Note: "Importance of nicotinic acid in treatment of "black tongue" in dogs and in pellegra in man")	May 27, 1901 McFarland, Wisconsin, United States	July 27, 1962 Madison, Wisconsin, United States	1939, 1940, 1942, 1943, 1947, 1950, 1956	Nominated for the Nobel Prize in Chemistry too
	Dilworth Wayne Woolley (Note: "Study of the biological antagonism between metabolically important compounds and their structural analogs; isolation and identification of the vitamins: nicotinic acid, pantothenic acid, inositol and strepogonin; studies of the nutritional requirements of microorganisms and animals")	July 20, 1914 Raymond, Alberta, Canada	July 23, 1966 Cuzco, Peru	1939, 1940, 1948, 1949, 1950, 1955, 1956	
