= List of Turkish Nobel laureates =

To date, a total of three people of Turkish origin and Turkish citizenship have won the Nobel Prize. The first of these was Orhan Pamuk in 2006. A list of these individuals is provided in the table below.

| Year | Image | Laureate | Born | Field | Rationale |
|---|---|---|---|---|---|
| 2024 | | Daron Acemoglu (Note: Turkish citizen of Armenian descent) | 1967 in Turkey | Economics | "for studies of how institutions are formed and affect prosperity" |
| 2015 | | Aziz Sancar | 1946 in Turkey | Chemistry | "for mechanistic studies of DNA repair" |
| 2006 | | Orhan Pamuk | 1952 in Turkey | Literature | "who in the quest for the melancholic soul of his native city has discovered new symbols for the clash and interlacing of cultures" |

== Nominations ==
Here are people who has been nominated for the Nobel Prize but did not win.

| Year | Image | Laureate | Born | Field |
|---|---|---|---|---|
| 2018 2020 | | Garo Paylan (Note: Turkish citizen of Armenian descent) | 1972 in Turkey | Peace |
| 1970; 1971; 1972; 1973 | | Fazıl Hüsnü Dağlarca | 1914 in Ottoman Empire | Literature |
| 1969 | | Feza Gürsey | 1921 in Ottoman Empire | Physics |
| 1967 | | İsmet İnönü | 1884 in Ottoman Empire | Peace |
| 1934 | | Mustafa Kemal Atatürk (Note: Nominated by Venizelos, former Greece prime minister) | 1881 in Ottoman Empire | Peace |
| 1932 | | Kemal Cenap Berksoy | 1875 in Ottoman Empire | Physiology or Medicine |
| 1910 | | Committee of Union and Progress | | Peace |
| 1973 | | Yasar Kemal | 1923 in Turkey | Literature |

== Laureates with Turkish linkage ==
- Giorgos Seferis, 1963 Nobel laureate born in Ottoman Empire
- Mother Teresa, 1979 Nobel Peace Prize laureate born in Ottoman Empire
- Tawakkol Karman, 2011 Yemeni Nobel Peace Prize laureate, whom later had Turkish citizenship.

== See also ==
- List of Nobel laureates by country
