= Gaston Ramon =

French veterinarian and biologist (1886–1963)

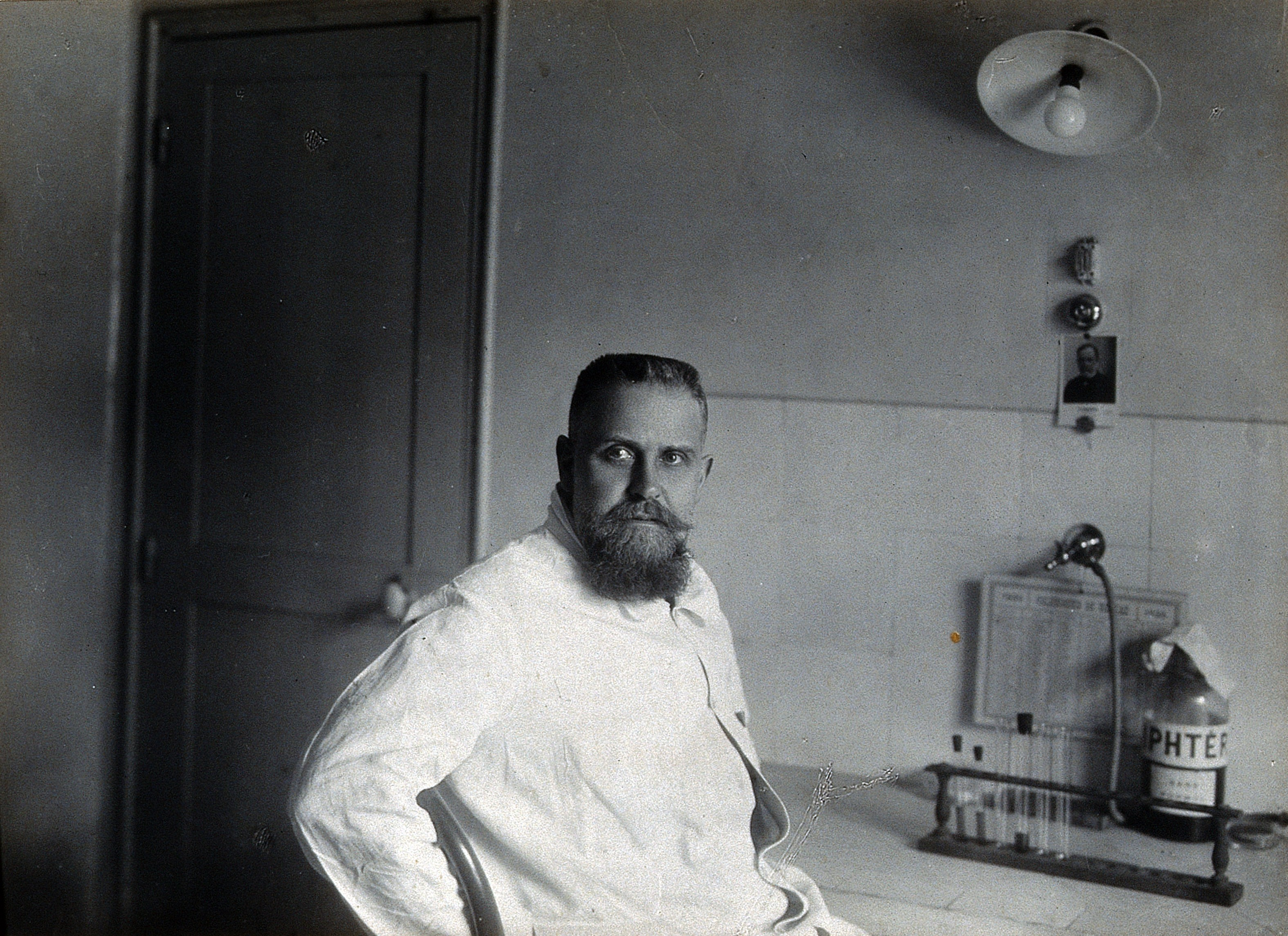
Gaston Ramon

Gaston Ramon (30 September 1886 – 8 June 1963) was a French veterinarian and biologist best known for his role in the treatment of diphtheria and tetanus.

He was born in Bellechaume (Yonne, France) and attended l'École vétérinaire d'Alfort from 1906 to 1910. In 1917 he married Marthe Momont, grandniece of Emile Roux.

During the 1920s, Ramon, along with P. Descombey, made major contributions to the development of effective vaccines for both diphtheria and tetanus. In particular, he developed a method for inactivating the diphtheria toxin and the tetanus toxin using formaldehyde which, in its essentials, is still used in vaccines manufactured today. He also developed a method for determining the potency of the vaccines, an essential element required for the reproducible production of these pharmaceuticals.

He received 155 Nobel Prize in Physiology or Medicine nominations but never received the prize.

A collection of his papers is held at the National Library of Medicine in Bethesda, Maryland.

== Bibliography ==
Ebisawa, I. 1987. The encounter of Gaston Ramon (1886–1963) with formalin: A biographical study of a great scientist. Kitasato Archives of Experimental Medicine 60 (3): 55–70.
