= Eber Landau =

Latvian anatomist (1878–1959

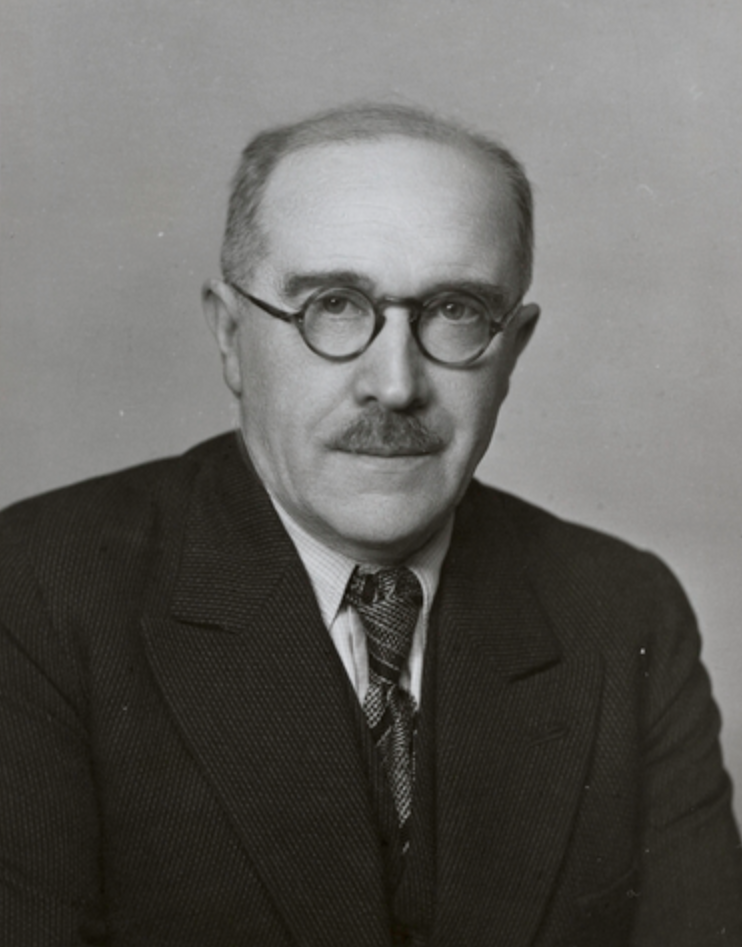
Landau c. 1935–1940

Eber Landau (8 November 1878 – 30 October 1959) was a Baltic German-Swiss anatomist and histologist.

Landau was born in Rēzekne in Vitebsk Governorate, Russian Empire (now in Latvia). He studied medicine at the Imperial University of Dorpat, graduating in 1902. Later, Landau continued his education with studies in anatomy and histology in the laboratory of histology at Munich (1903) and at St. Petersburg as an assistant of Peter Lesgaft (1837–1909). From 1906 to 1912 he worked in Dorpat as a prosector-assistant in the anatomical institute directed by August Rauber (1841-1917). In 1913, Landau moved to the University of Bern as an associate professor, shortly afterwards relocating to Paris, where he conducted neurological research under the directorship of Joseph Jules Dejerine (1849-1917).

In 1918, Landau returned to Bern, where he spent several years working in the institute of anatomy. In 1923 he founded the department of histology and embryology at Kaunas University. Here he served as departmental head until 1932, afterwards relocating to the University of Lausanne, where he conducted investigations in the fields of brain anatomy, neurology and neurohistology.

== Partial bibliography ==
- Materjaly dlia mikroskopicheskoj anatomii, fiziologii patologii nadpochechnoj zelesi. Disertacija (Microscopic anatomy, physiology, and pathology of suprarenal glands). Doctoral dissertation) Jurjevas: Jurjevo Universitetas; 1907.
- Die Sehrinde : eine anthropologische Studie an Schweizerhirnen, 1914 - The visual cortex.
- Anatomie des grosshirns, formanalytische untersuchungen, 1923 - Anatomy of the cerebrum, formal analytic investigations.
- Biologi koji reliatyvyb s teorija (Theory of biological relativity) Kosmos 1925;5:265-375.
- Saul olin – nauji da ai histologijos technikoje (Sun herbs as a source of a new type of dyes used in histology) Medicina (Kaunas); 1930.
- Trumpas histologijos technikos vadov lis (A short manual of histological techniques) Kaunas; 1930.
- Le claustrum parvum chez l'homme, 1938 - The claustrum parvum of humans.
- Les voies de l'influx nerveux, 1948 - The channels of nerve impulses.
