= Ovchukhi =

Ovchukhi Овчухи
- Selo
- Location within Vladimir Oblast Location within Russia
- Coordinates: 56°15′N 40°20′E
- Country: Russia
- Region: Vladimir Oblast
- District: Suzdalsky District
- Time zone: UTC+3:00

Ovchukhi (Russian: Овчухи) is a rural locality (a selo) in Pavlovskoye Rural Settlement, Suzdalsky District, Vladimir Oblast, Russia. The population was 153 as of 2010. There are 8 streets.

== Geography ==
Ovchukhi is located on the right bank of the Rpen River, 33 km southwest of Suzdal (the district's administrative centre) by road. Brutovo is the nearest rural locality.
