= Lubenec =

- Municipality
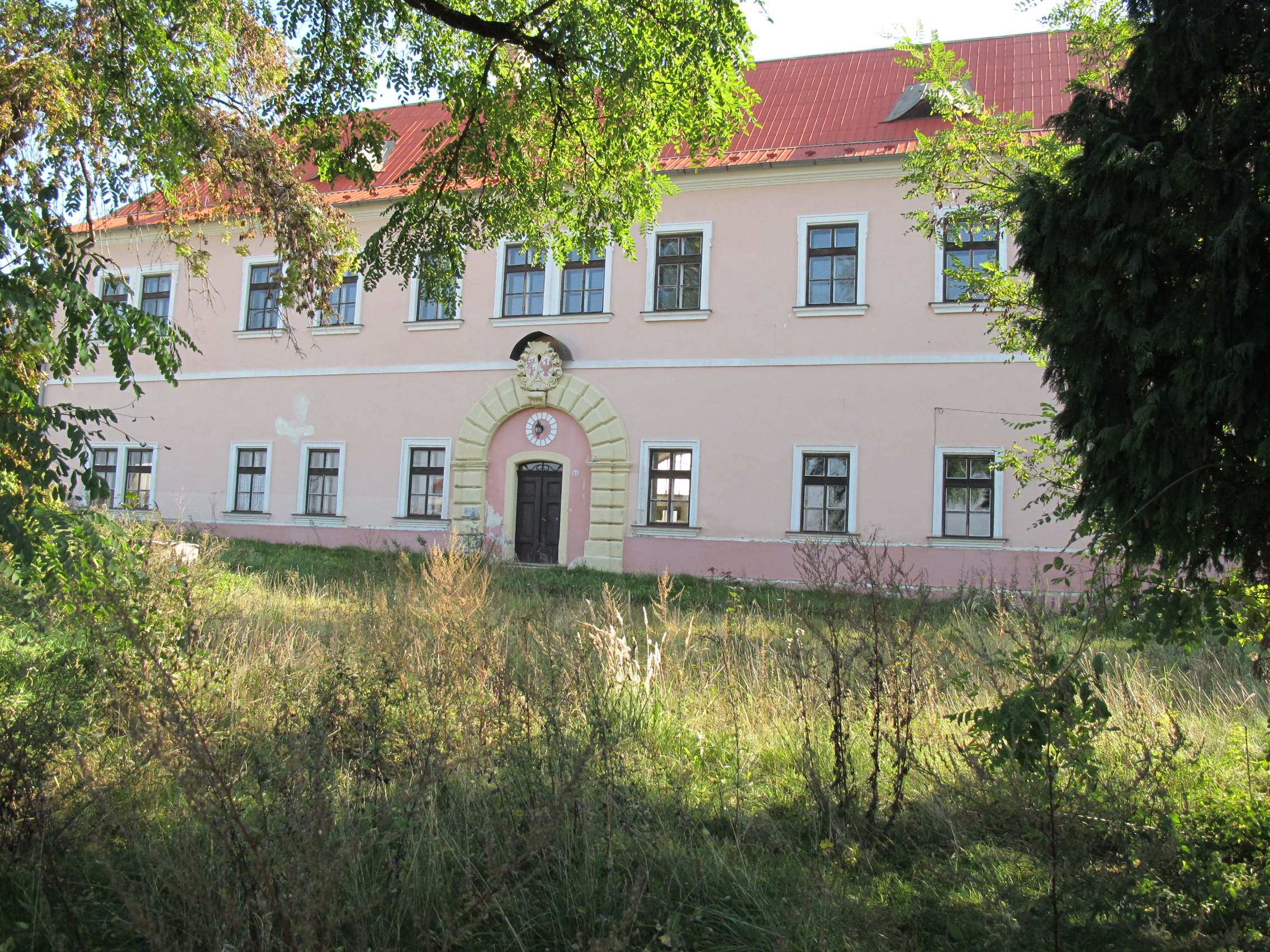
- Former castle and porcelain factory

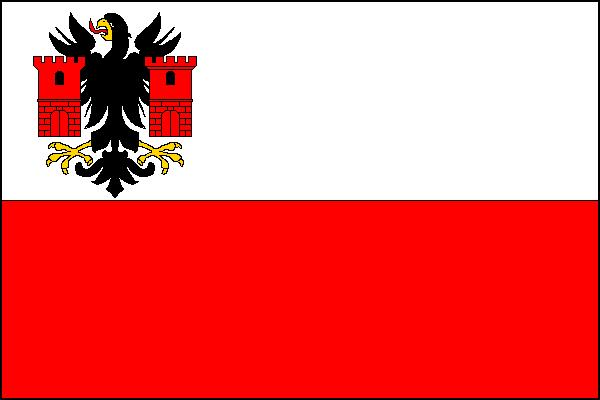
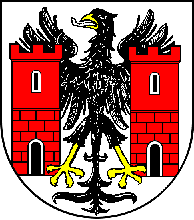
- Flag Coat of arms

- Location in the Czech Republic
- Coordinates: 50°7′56″N 13°18′48″E
- Country: Czech Republic
- Region: Ústí nad Labem
- District: Louny
- First mentioned: 1115

Area
  - Total: 36.65 km^{2} (14.15 sq mi)
- Elevation: 373 m (1,224 ft)

Population (2026-01-01)
  - Total: 1,318
  - Density: 35.96/km^{2} (93.14/sq mi)
- Time zone: UTC+1 (CET)
  - Summer (DST): UTC+2 (CEST)
- Postal codes: 439 83, 441 01
- Website: www.lubenec.cz

Lubenec (German: Lubenz) is a municipality and village in Louny District in the Ústí nad Labem Region of the Czech Republic. It has about 1,300 inhabitants.

Lubenec lies approximately 43 kilometres (27 mi) south-west of Louny, 79 km (49 mi) south-west of Ústí nad Labem, and 80 km (50 mi) west of Prague.

== Administrative division ==
Lubenec consists of ten municipal parts (in brackets population according to the 2021 census):

- Lubenec (1,048)
- Dolní Záhoří (3)
- Drahonice (301)
- Horní Záhoří (0)
- Ležky (75)
- Libkovice (24)
- Libyně (23)
- Přibenice (15)
- Řepany (16)
- Vítkovice (23)

== Demographics ==
Historical population
Year	Pop.	±%
1869	3,051	—
1880	2,958	−3.0%
1890	2,645	−10.6%
1900	2,663	+0.7%
1910	2,636	−1.0%
1921	2,504	−5.0%
1930	2,766	+10.5%
1950	1,598	−42.2%
1961	1,731	+8.3%
1970	1,628	−6.0%
1980	1,609	−1.2%
1991	1,508	−6.3%
2001	1,555	+3.1%
2011	1,590	+2.3%
2021	1,528	−3.9%
Source: Censuses

== Notable people ==
- Alfred Kohn (1867–1959), histologist
