= Alfred Kohn =

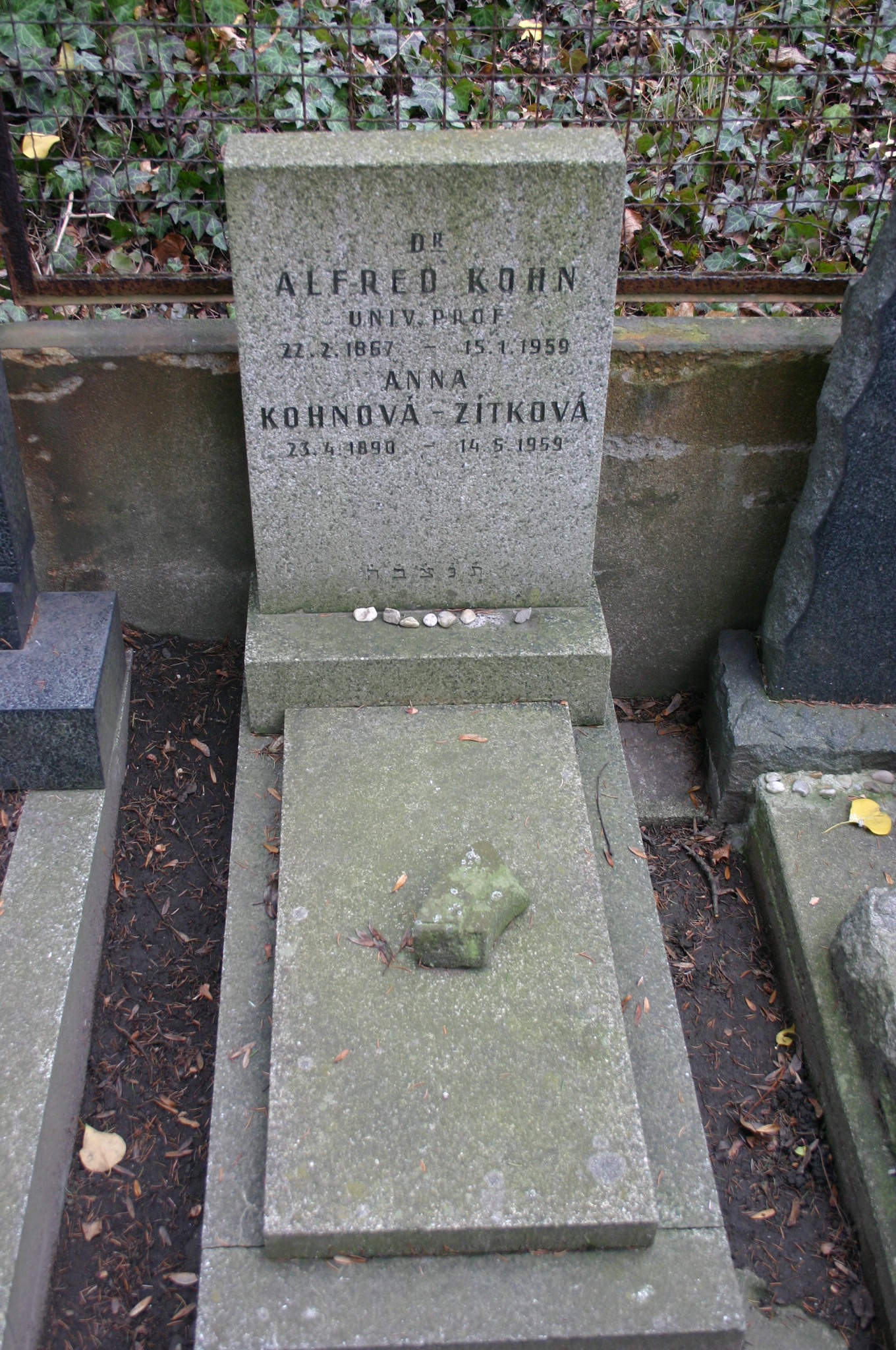
- Tomb of Kohn and his family at New Jewish Cemetery in Prague
- Born: 22 February 1867; Libyně, Bohemia, Austrian Empire
- Died: 15 January 1959 (aged 91); Prague, Czechoslovakia
- Scientific career
- Fields: histology
- Workplaces: German University in Prague

Alfred Kohn (22 February 1867 – 15 January 1959) was a Czech histologist.

== Life and career ==
He headed the Institute of Histology at the Medical Faculty of German University in Prague for 26 years. He discovered the nature and origin of parathyroid glands and pioneered research on chromaffin cells and sympathetic paraganglia. Kohn's papers covered topics including the pituitary, interstitial cells of testes, and ovaries, all of which relate to endocrinology. All of his studies were based on descriptive and comparative histological and embryological observations. Kohn was twice the dean of German Medical Faculty, and an honorary member of many scientific societies. He was repeatedly nominated for Nobel Prize for physiology and medicine.

Due to his Jewish origin, he was expelled from Deutsche Gesellschaft der Wissenschaften und Künste für die Tschechoslowakische Republik in 1939 and transported to Theresienstadt Ghetto in Terezín in 1943. After World War II, he lived in Prague. On his 90th birthday, he was elected honorary president of Anatomische Gesellschaft and awarded by the Czechoslovak Order of Labour. Alfred Kohn died in Prague on 15 January 1959.
