= Izrael Hieger =

Polish-born British biochemist (1901–1986)

Izrael Hieger c. 1933

Izrael Hieger DSc (London) (13 June 1901 – 14 October 1986) was a biochemist whose work focused on carcinogenesis. He discovered the first known organic carcinogenic compound. In 1937 Hieger, with colleagues Ernest Kennaway and J. W. Cook, was nominated for a Nobel Prize for work on isolating chemical carcinogenic agents from tar and studies on the relation between chemical constitution and carcinogenic activity.

== Early life ==
Hieger was born in Osieck, Mazowieckie, Russian Empire (present Republic of Poland), to parents Francis Ephroim and Helena Chaje Heiger and was the youngest of nine. Preempting the Siedlcepogrom of 1906, Heiger's parents emigrated with the younger children, settling in London. There he attended Christ's College, Finchley, going on to study at Birkbeck, University of London and University College London. Heiger married Esther (née Bull), and although not a member, financially assisted a Trotskyist group in London run by C.L.R. James, of which Esther and her future husband Earle Birney were a part. Their marriage ended in 1936. In 1943, Hieger married social worker, painter and poet Lois (née Peirson). They had one daughter.

== Career ==
In 1924 Hieger joined Kennaway at the Cancer Hospital Research Institute (CHRI). In pioneering work with W. V. Mayneord, the hospital's medical physicist, Hieger discovered the first known organic carcinogenic compound. Exploiting a method of fluorescence spectroscopy indicated similar spectra for carcinogenic tars and 1,2-benzanthracene and related polyaromatic hydrocarbons (PAHs). In 1931 Hieger painstakingly obtained 7 g of crystalline hydrocarbon from two tonnes of gas-works soft pitch. This was identified as 3:4-benzo(a)pyrene, and highly carcinogenic. The discovery confirmed concerns over the correlation between occupational cancers and industries which involved exposure to tar, coal-gas and synthetic dyes In 1939, Hieger and four colleagues, (Kennaway, Mayneord, J. W. Cook and C. L. Hewett) were awarded the first Anna Fuller Memorial Prize for cancer research.

== Published works ==
=== Books ===
- I. Hieger, One in six: An outline of the cancer problem, 1955
- I. Hieger, Carcinogenesis, 1961

=== Papers ===
- I. Hieger, On the Alleged Action of X-rays upon Cholesterol, ‘’Biochemical Journal’’ 21, pp407-11, 1927
- I. Hieger, The Influence of Dilution on the Carcinogenic Effect of Tar, ‘’The Journal of Pathology’’, V.32 (3), pp419-23, 1929
- I. Hieger, The Spectra of Cancer-Producing Tars and Oils and of Related Substances, ‘’Biochemical Journal’’ 24, pp505-11, 1930
- I. Hieger, Ernest Kennaway Carcinogenic Substances and their Fluorescence Spectra, ‘’The British Medical Journal’’, 1930
- I. Hieger, H. Burrows, E. Kennaway The Experimental Production of Tumours of Connective Tissue, ‘’American Journal of Cancer’’ 16, pp56-67, 1932
- I. Hieger, J. W. Cook, C. L. Hewett The Isolation of a Cancer-producing Hydrocarbon from Coal Tar Parts 1, 2 and 3, ‘’Journal of the Chemical Society (Resumed)’’, pp395-405, 1933
- I. Hieger, ‘’American Journal of Cancer’’ 29, pp705-14, 1937
- I. Hieger, ‘’American Journal of Cancer’’ 39, pp496-503, 1940
- I. Hieger, Carcinogenic Substances in Human Tissue, ‘’Cancer Research’’, V.6 pp657-67, 1946
- I. Hieger, Carcinogenic Activity of Preparations rich in Cholesterol, ‘’Nature’’, V.160, pp270-71, 1947
- I. Hieger, Progress of Cancer Research, ‘’Nature’’, 1948
- I. Hieger, Carcinogenic Activity of Lipoid Substances, ‘’British Journal of Cancer’’, V.3, pp123-39, 1949
- I. Hieger, On the Transmission of Mouse Tumours by Dried Tumour Tissue, ‘’Acta Unio Internationalis Contra Cancrum’’, V.7 (2), p259-62, Geneva, Switzerland, 1951
- I. Hieger and S.F.D.Orr, On the Carcinogenic Activity of Purified Cholesterol, ‘’British Journal of Cancer’’, V.8 (2), pp274-90, 1954
- I. Hieger, Cholesterol as a Carcinogen, ‘’Proceedings of the Royal Society’’, B (Biological Sciences), V. 147, pp84-8, 1957
- I. Hieger, Cholesterol Carcinogenesis, ‘’British Medical Bulletin’’, V.14, pp159-160, 1958
- I. Hieger, Carcinogenesis of Cholesterol, ‘’British Journal of Cancer’’V.8 (3), pp439-51, 1959
- I. Hieger, ‘’Acta Unio Internationalis Contra Cancrum’’, V.15, p603, Geneva, Switzerland, 1960
- I. Hieger, Cholesterol as Carcinogen- I. Sarcoma Induction by Cholesterol in a Sensitive Strain of Mice, ‘’British Journal of Cancer’’, V.16 (4), pp716-21, 1962
- I. Hieger, Studies in Carcinogenesis, ‘’British Journal of Cancer’’, 1965.
