= William Valentine Mayneord =

British radiologist

William Valentine Mayneord, CBE FRS (14 February 1902 – 10 August 1988) was a British physicist and pioneer in the field of medical physics.

== Early life and education ==
He was born in Redditch, Worcestershire to Walter and Elizabeth Mayneord but after the early death of his mother was adopted by an aunt in Evesham. He was educated at Prince Henry's School, Evesham and gained a Bachelor of Science at the University of Birmingham

== Career ==
He entered the field of medical physics in 1924 at St Bart's Hospital in London. In 1927 he moved to the Cancer Hospital, now the Royal Marsden Hospital. There he was involved in pioneering work with Izrael Hieger. During World War II he was seconded by the government to work in Canada on the radiological aspects of atomic energy development.

It has been said that such was his renown, especially for bringing in the use of the radiological unit the rad, that the SI unit may well have been called the mayneord instead of the gray (2). It was during a meeting in 1946 with a young Harold Elford Johns, inventor of the cobalt-60 teletherapy unit, that Johns was prompted to go into medical physics. His department subsequently developed one of the world's first radioisotope scanners.

== Awards and recognition ==
He was awarded Gold Medal for Radiation Protection in 1965.

He was elected a Fellow of the Royal Society in 1965. His candidacy citation read: "Distinguished for his applications of physics to medical sciences. He was responsible for the use of fluorescence spectroscopy in the collaborative study of carcinogenic agents in coal-tar which led to the discovery of the activity of 3:4 – benzopyrene. He was among the first to measure gamma-radiation in "r" units. His precision measurements have stood the test of time. He is recognised as the leading authority in the United Kingdom on the applications of radiation dosimetry to medical radiology and to the problems of radiation hazards."

He was awarded a CBE in 1965.
