= Ernest Kennaway =

British pathologist

Sir Ernest Laurence Kennaway FRS
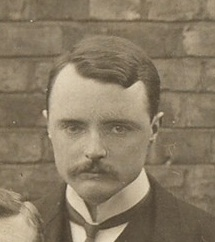
- Born: 23 May 1881; Exeter, England
- Died: 1 January 1958 (aged 76); St. Bartholomews Hospital, London EC1
- Education: University College London; University of Oxford
- Known for: Discovery of the first pure compound to show carcinogenic activity
- Awards: Royal Medal (1941); Fellow of the Royal Society
- Scientific career
- Fields: Pathology
- Workplaces: Guy's Hospital, London; Institute of Cancer Research, London

Sir Ernest Laurence Kennaway FRS (23 May 1881 – 1 January 1958) was a British pathologist and Royal Medal winner. He first became interested in natural life when, due to a childhood illness, he was encouraged to spend time outdoors. He was trained at University College London, and in 1898 was accepted into New College, Oxford on an open scholarship to study natural sciences. He graduated with a B.A. in 1903, and after three years at Middlesex Hospital he completed a Bachelor of Medicine and Surgery. After graduating he worked for The Lister Institute for Preventive Medicine and UCL before returning to Oxford, this time to Brasenose College on a Hulme scholarship in 1909. He became a Travelling Fellow of Brasenose in 1910, a Doctor of Medicine in 1911 and a Doctor of Science (specifically physiological chemistry) in 1915.

In 1909 he became a physiology demonstrator at Guy's Hospital, where he remained until he was made head of the department of chemical pathology at the Bland-Sutton Institute of Pathology in 1914. As head of department he conducted research into purine metabolism and ketonuria, proving in 1921, having been recruited by The Institute of Cancer Research, London, that the carcinogen in coal was a cyclic hydrocarbon. In 1929 he discovered the first pure compound to show evidence of cancer-causing activity, 1:2:5:6-dibenzanthracene, and also discovered a series of other carcinogenic hydrocarbons including methylcholanthrene. In 1930, Kennaway and Izrael Hieger showed for the first time that single polycyclic aromatic hydrocarbons (PAHs), such as dibenz[a,h]anthracene, are tumorigenic in mouse skin. Between 1932 and 1942 he published six articles on these discoveries in the Proceedings of the Royal Society.

After the death of Professor Archibald Leitch in 1931, Kennaway became professor of chemical pathology and Director of The Institute of Cancer Research, where he remained until his retirement in 1946. He was awarded the Royal Medal in 1941 "For his discovery of the nature of the carcinogenic substances in coal tar and for his investigations on production of cancer by synthetic substances." and was knighted in 1947. At a conference commissioned by the Medical Research Council in 1947, he suggested that cigarette smoking rather than air pollution might be a cause of the large and continuing increase in lung cancer. The conference concluded that a large-scale case-control study should be undertaken, which led to the classic study of Doll and Hill that linked smoking to lung cancer.

For over thirty years he had suffered from Parkinson's disease, and this eventually killed him on 1 January 1958.
