= Post-Confederation Canada (1867–1914) =

Post-Confederation era
- 1867–1914
British colonial era	World Wars and Interwar era
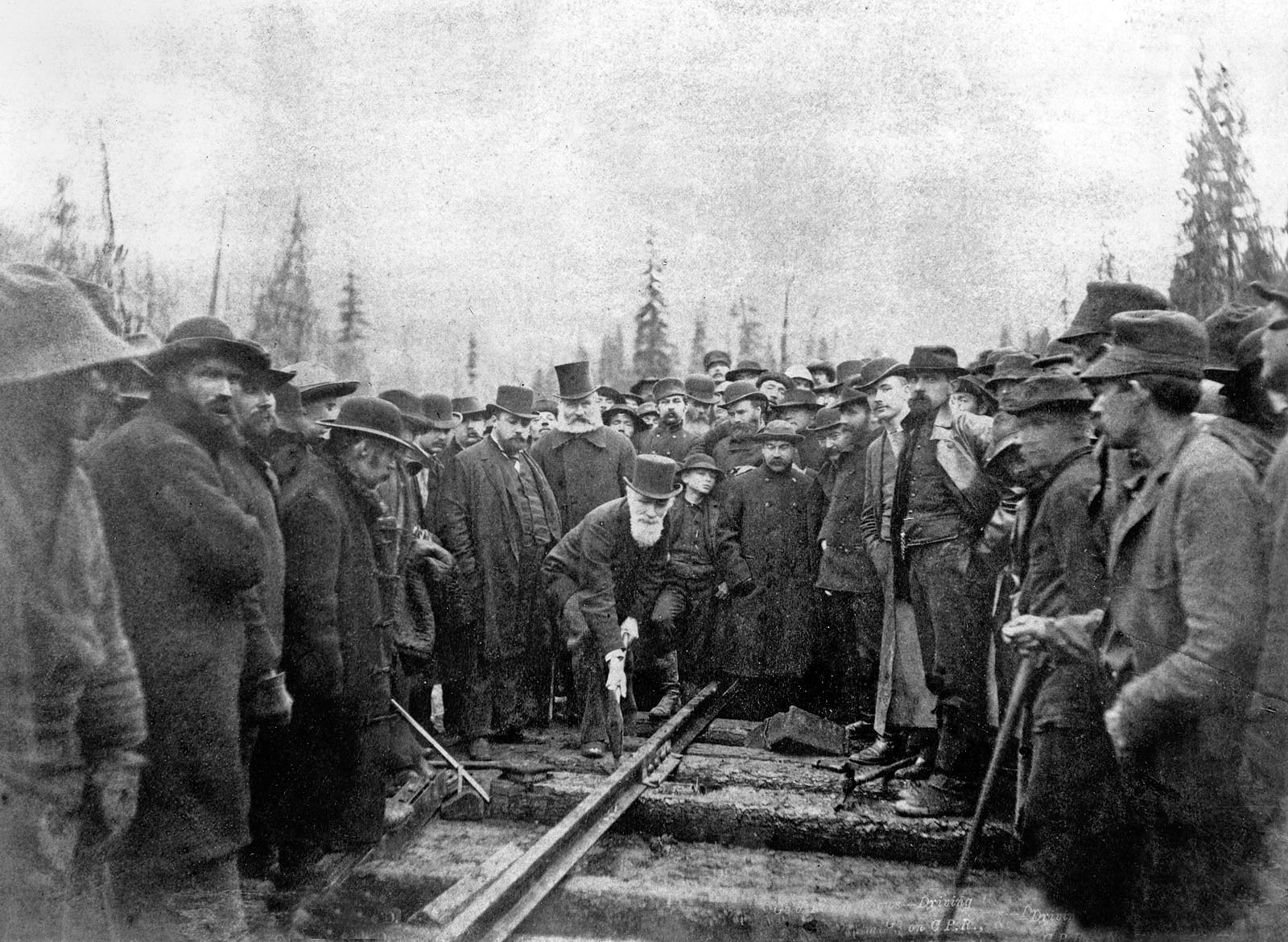
- The last, last spike of the Canadian Pacific Railway, Craigellachie, British Columbia, November 7, 1885
- Leader(s): John A. Macdonald; Wilfrid Laurier

Post-Confederation Canada (1867–1914) is history of Canada from the formation of the Dominion to the outbreak of World War I in 1914. Canada had a population of 3.5 million, residing in the large expanse from Cape Breton to just beyond the Great Lakes, usually within a hundred miles or so of the Canada–United States border. One in three Canadians were French, and about 100,000 were aboriginal (First Nation, Inuit, Métis). It was a rural country composed of small farms. With a population of 115,000, Montreal was the largest city, followed by Toronto and Quebec at about 60,000. Pigs roamed the muddy streets of Ottawa, the small new national capital.

Besides subsistence agriculture, the economy was based on exports of lumber, fish and grain, and the import of investment capital from London and New York. Factories were small, except for those making farm implements. Overall the economy prospered in the first years of Confederation, but a world-wide depression 1873–1896 severely hurt the export economy, reduced the inflow of foreign capital, and reduced the flow of immigration. Economic growth of total GNP (in constant dollars) averaged only 2.4 percent per year, 1870 to 1896, then surged to 6.2 percent, 1897–1913. Part of that increase was due to population growth. The rate of growth of GNP per capita was 1.3%, 1870 to 1896, then surged to 2.6 percent, 1897–1913. The growth rate was respectable, but lower than that of the United States, and fuelled a sense of disappointment that Confederation had not delivered on its promise of prosperity.

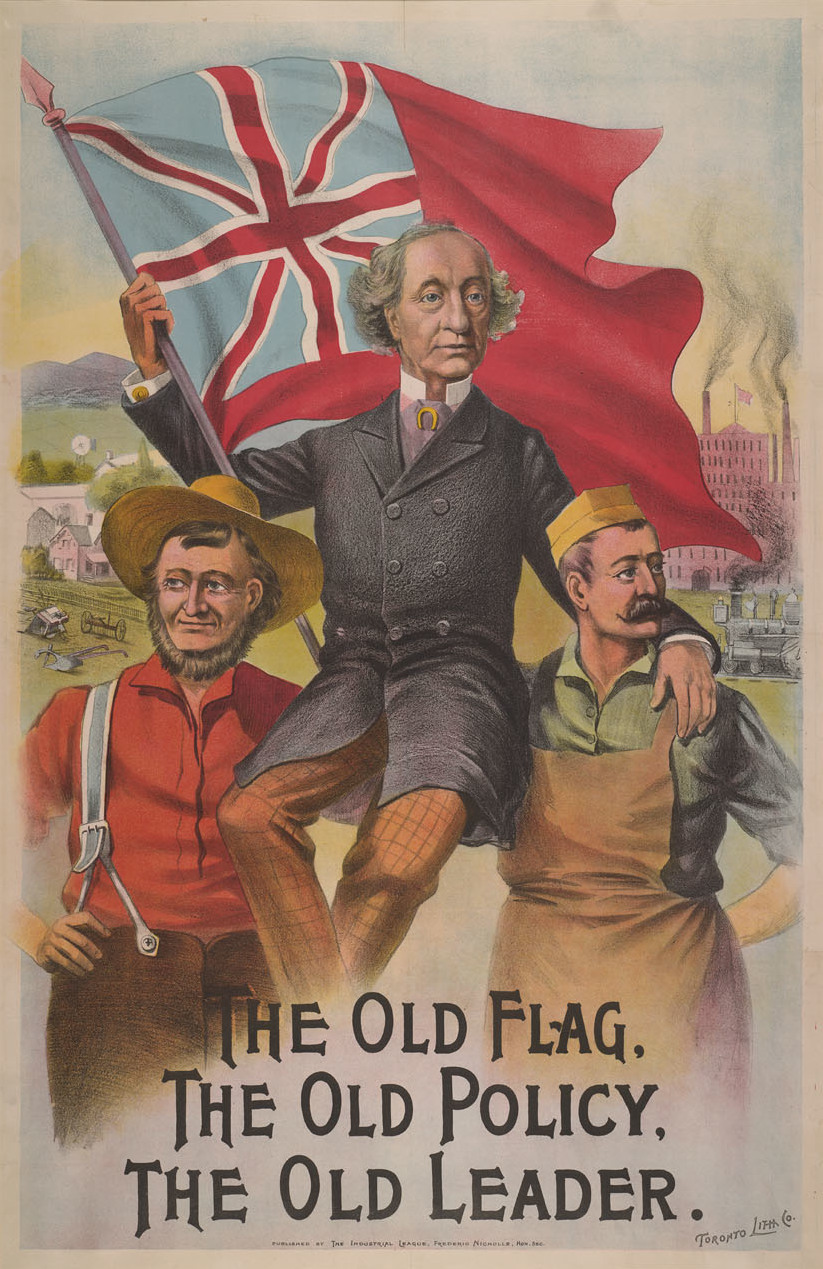
An election poster from 1891, featuring John A. Macdonald

Politically, the Father of Confederation, John A. Macdonald (1815–1891) and his Conservative Party ("Tories") dominated national politics until his death (with one interruption). The Liberals ("Grits") under Wilfrid Laurier (1841–1919) were in power 1896 to 1911, and then were ousted in a campaign based on anti-Americanism by Robert Borden.

Francophones had a distinct and traditionalistic culture, led by the landholders and the priests. The Anglophones took pride in their monarchism and in their refusal to be swallowed up by the United States. Baseball and lacrosse were favourite sports. Cultural facilities were limited. There were only two public libraries in the entire new country; half the adults in Quebec could not read. Hard drinking in all ranks was the norm; in fact, the new prime minister, John A. Macdonald, was sometimes drunk in public. Politically, the new nation was defined by its practicality, realism, and stoicism; it had little interest in theory or esthetics. Much more important was loyalty to family, church, political party, and Queen Victoria. Historians later emphasized the iconic phrase "Peace, Order and Good Government" ("paix, ordre et bon gouvernement") as founding constitutional principles, but at the time it was rarely quoted.

On the eve of the great war in 1914, the national population had reached 8.1 million. Most of the growth had taken place in the new western provinces, Manitoba, Saskatchewan, Alberta, and British Columbia, while immigration from abroad reached 400,000 annually. The great national achievement was the building of transcontinental railways that opened the prairies to settlement. The rich new farmlands, combined with technological advances enabling wheat farming at higher latitudes and increased investment from Great Britain, made Canada a major exporter of wheat. Issues of anti-imperialist nationalism versus imperial nationalism and loyalty to the Crown continued. So too did increasingly bitter disputes on language issues, especially the role of the French language outside Québec. Ethno-religious tensions flared between the French Canadians and the English Canadians, between the Catholic Irish ("greens") and the Protestant Irish ("Orange"), and between the Europeans and the Asians on the West Coast.

== Confederation ==
In the 1860s, the British were concerned with the possibility of an American assault on Canada in the wake of the American Civil War. Britain also feared that American settlers might expand to the north, into a land that was technically British but which was sparsely settled. There were also problems with raids into Canada launched by the Fenian Brotherhood, a group of Irish Americans who wanted to pressure Britain into granting independence to Ireland. Canada was already essentially a self-governing colony since the 1840s, and Britain no longer felt it was worth the expense of keeping it as a colony. Both sides would, it was felt, be better off politically and economically if Canada was independent. These factors led to the first serious discussions about real, formal political union in Canada. However, there were internal political obstacles to overcome first. The Province of Canada had little success in keeping a stable government for any period of time; the Tories, led by John A. Macdonald and George-Étienne Cartier, were constantly at odds with the "Clear Grits" led by George Brown. In 1864, the two parties decided to unite in the "Great Coalition". This was an important step towards Confederation.

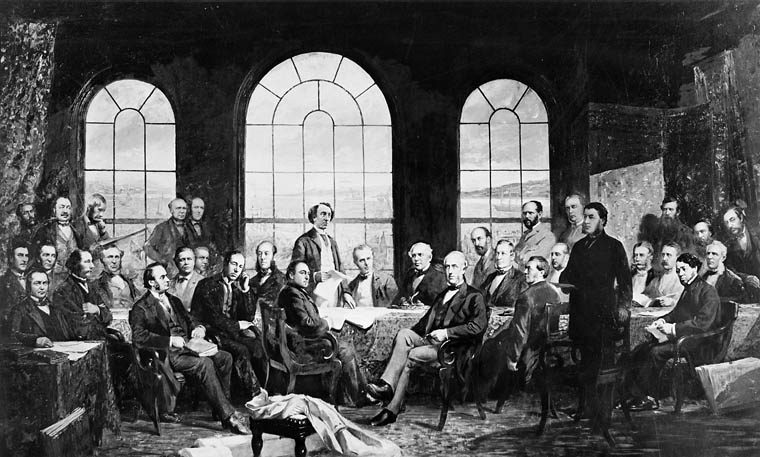
"Fathers of Confederation" meeting in Quebec City

Meanwhile, the colonies further east, Nova Scotia, New Brunswick, Prince Edward Island, and Newfoundland, were also discussing a political union with each other. Representatives from the Province of Canada joined them at the Charlottetown Conference in Charlottetown, Prince Edward Island in 1864 to discuss a union of all the colonies, and these discussions were extended into the Quebec Conference of 1864. While there was opposition in each of the colonies, only Prince Edward Island and Newfoundland decided to remain outside of the planned Confederation. In 1867, representatives of the other colonies travelled to Britain to finalize the union, which was granted by the British North America Act (BNA Act) on July 1, 1867.

Early drafts of the BNA Act showed that Macdonald and the other Fathers of Confederation had viewed the new nation as a kingdom, calling for the official name of the country to be the "Kingdom of Canada". Though it is still considered that Canada became a "kingdom in her own right" in 1867, it was felt by the Colonial Office in London that a name such as Kingdom of Canada was too "premature" and "pretentious." Instead the term "Dominion" was adopted. In 1879, July 1 was formally established as Dominion Day to celebrate Confederation. While the BNA Act gave Canada a high degree of autonomy within the British Empire, this autonomy extended only to internal affairs. External affairs, such as border negotiations with the United States, were still controlled from Britain. The new country was led by Prime Minister John A. Macdonald, leader of the Conservative Party.

== Social and political tensions ==
Canada's material condition was weak, 1867–1896, and the psychological mood became increasingly embittered. Historian Arthur Lower concludes that in the late 1880s, "never before or since has Canada reached such a low state; never has there been so little evidence among its people of national spirit." The economy grew very slowly, and large districts, especially in the Maritimes and Quebec were becoming more poor every year. Canada industrialized very slowly, and therefore generated few high-paying jobs. The hard-scrabble farms were hard-pressed to compete with American agriculture. Immigrants were bypassing Canada for the fast-growing United States, where high wages and new jobs and fresh lands were awaiting the ambitious. Many Canadians themselves emigrated to the States. Anglophones went to New York, Michigan and Minnesota. Quebeckers move south into the textile mills of New England. A half-million people left the Maritimes, and few newcomers arrived. The Fathers of Confederation had envisioned fast economic growth through building a transcontinental railroad network. But it was not finished until the late 1880s, and it seemed to produce more frustration and dismay than prosperity. In Manitoba, for example, local businessmen and speculators were outraged when the Canadian Pacific Railway suddenly shifted its operations away from the centre of the province, to the southern edge, and its lawyers and politicians blocked the opening of rival lines. Canadians distrusted their politicians, and repeatedly sought out and discovered corrupt deals, especially financial contracts made by and for the benefit of politicians. There was a widespread sense that Confederation had been a failure. Provincial politicians sought to weaken the powers of the central government, and there were few local voices speaking in support of it.

=== Battles over language ===
Religious, language and ethnic differences worsened decade by decade. European Canadians were highly religious, but the Protestants and Catholics hated each other. The Francophones saw their traditional culture under siege by the Anglophones, who controlled business and finance across Canada, including Quebec's, and systematically blocked the expansion of French language schools outside Quebec. The hanging of Louis Riel for treason in 1885 convinced Francophones they were under attack, and permanently undermined the Conservative base in Quebec. French nationalism emerged as a powerful force that is still a dominant factor in Quebec's history. Inside the Irish community, the longstanding bitterness between the Protestant Orange and the Catholic green continued unabated. The Orange boasted of the supremacy of their Anglo-Saxon civilization and Protestant culture over the backward, medieval, priest-ridden Catholicism. They ridiculed the French and Irish races as backwards and ultimately doomed. (Note: "Race” was a synonym for what the 21st century calls an ethnic group.) The ethnic-religious-language lines were sharply drawn. Intermarriage was rare and indeed friendships and casual communication were not sought after. The Catholic Irish, however, joined with Protestants to block the expansion of French schools outside Quebec, thereby causing severe tensions inside the Catholic community.

Anglophones generally trusted Britain and the British Empire, but London had different ideas. London pushed for Confederation after the American Civil War so as to avoid the enormous expense of defending Canada against a possible American invasion. In the Alaska boundary dispute it demonstrated that the goodwill of the United States outweighed Canadian interests. Many businessmen, on the other hand, wanted to join the United States, leading to political tension in the upper-class clubs and boardrooms.

Finally after 1896, with the opening of the rich Western wheat plans, did the Canadian economy recover. Immigration surged, and a spirit of optimism returned to Canada.

== First Nations ==
As part of Confederation, Canada was now responsible for existing treaty obligations with First Nations. Under Macdonald, Canada bought Rupert's Land and the North-Western Territory (NWT) from the Hudson's Bay Company in 1869. This was unceded First Nations territory and the new government continued the British policy of acquiring land through treaty negotiations with several First Nations to enable European settlement. The exception was the existing colony of British Columbia, which did not enter into treaties with the Coastal First Nations. The Numbered Treaties were negotiated by the Government of Canada and various First Nations, beginning with Treaty 1 in 1871. In these treaties, the First Nations gave up aboriginal title to vast amounts of land, in exchange for reserves for their exclusive use and various promises of schools, food and other entitlements.

There were no full-scale Indian wars such as those fought in the United States as Canada expanded into First Nations territory in the Prairies. However, the expansion was not fully peaceful. A Métis uprising led to the formation of Manitoba in 1870. In 1873, the Government of Canada established the North-West Mounted Police to police the NWT. The Métis and some First Nations allies launched the North-West Rebellion in 1885 that was put down militarily. Smaller-scale skirmishes occurred between white settlers, Canadian and American traders and native peoples.

The period after Confederation was a period of hardship for many Prairie First Nations. The 1870s saw the disappearance of the herds of wild bison on the prairie, (partly due to illnesses passed from domesticated cattle). Many natives were affected by famine and disease introduced by Europeans and sought food and medical support when signing treaties with Canada. Aid to the natives was a political issue and federal allocations for the Department of Indian Affairs to provide medical support and food destined for famine relief were reduced by Macdonald's government. The period saw epidemics of smallpox and tuberculosis among the Plains First Nations. Partly due to malnutrition, tuberculosis ravaged the reserves in the 1880s.

Under Prime Minister Alexander Mackenzie, Canada introduced the Indian Act in 1876 to govern its relations with the First Nations. Under the Act, Canada also adopted a paternalistic role towards the First Nations peoples. Canada continued the pre-Confederation policy of 'civilizing' the First Nations peoples through "enfranchisement." To become full British subjects, natives had to give up their newly-designated "Indian status" and learn English. Canada banned some First Nations customs, for example, the Potlatch ban. Under the Act, a system of elected band councils was formed, intended to replace existing traditional government. Many Canadian policies were also contradictory. For example, Canadian officials viewed reserve farming as an important practice for assimilating First Nations; however, by the late 19th century officials were enforcing a Peasant Farm Policy that restricted reserve farmers largely to using hand tools in an effort to limit the competitiveness of First Nations farmers.

The Canadian government also introduced residential schools, where First Nation children were taught to forget their languages and traditions. The policies would continue well into the 20th century. The Truth and Reconciliation Commission of Canada would later term the school system to be a case of cultural genocide.

=== The Red River Rebellion ===
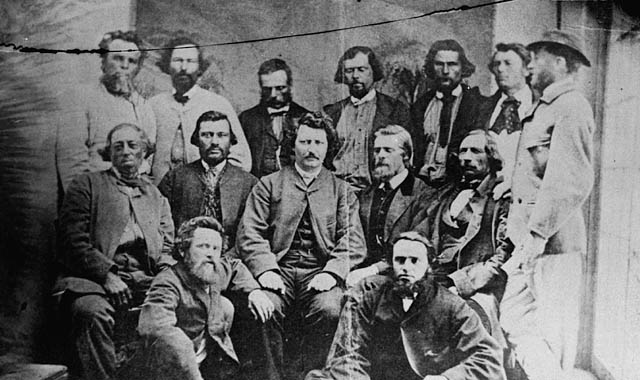
The Métis Red River Provisional Government

The new government of the confederated Canada encouraged westward settlement in the prairies. However, the people who already lived there, natives and Métis, descendants of the children of natives and French Canadian fur traders, were opposed to waves of English-speaking settlers taking their lands. The Métis of the Red River settlement (near present-day Winnipeg, Manitoba), led by Louis Riel, formed a provisional government to negotiate with the Canadian government, although these negotiations quickly fell apart. Riel led the Red River Rebellion in 1869 and 1870, during which he executed an uppity Orange Protestant Irishman, causing an uproar among Protestant English Canadians. Macdonald sent the militia to put down the rebellion, which they quickly did, and Riel fled to the United States. Many of the Métis moved west into unsettled areas of Saskatchewan.

The Rebellion led to the creation of the province of Manitoba in 1870, with laws intended to protect the rights of the natives, Métis, French-speakers and English-speakers, Catholics and Protestants.

=== The North-West Rebellion of 1885 ===
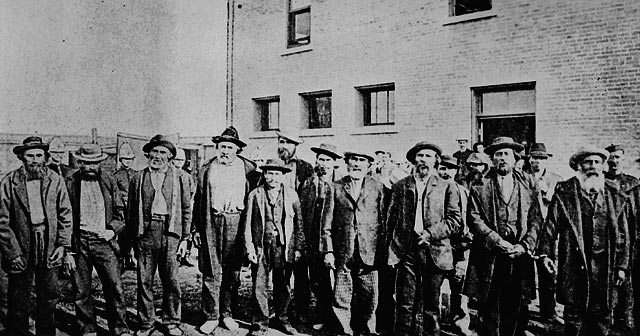
Métis and First Nation prisoners following the rebellion, August 1885

After the Red River Rebellion, many Métis moved west to what is now Saskatchewan. However, with the relentless westward expansion of the railway and the steady flow of settlers, they feared their way of life was threatened. In 1884, Riel was called upon by the Métis leadership, now based in Saskatchewan, to articulate Métis grievances to the Canadian government. Unexpectedly, he went beyond petitions and organized a military force that escalated into a small war, the North-West Rebellion of 1885. Riel was deserted by Catholic missionaries distressed by his heresies, and by all his former white allies. He was supported by the First Nations Cree and Assiniboine of Saskatchewan who joined the rebellion. Ottawa used the new rail lines to send in thousands of combat soldiers as well as Mounties and militia. They decisively defeated the rebel forces at their capital at Batoche. Some rebels escaped to the U.S. Riel was captured and convicted of high treason. Rejecting many protests and popular appeals, especially from Quebec, Prime Minister Macdonald decided to hang him. The Métis submitted sullenly; there was no further Indian war.

Riel was idealized as a heroic victim by Francophones; his execution had a lasting negative impact on Canada, polarizing the new nation along ethnic and religious lines. Riel's historical reputation has long been polarized between portrayals as a dangerous half-insane religious fanatic and rebel against the Canadian nation or by contrast a heroic rebel who fought to protect his Francophone people from the unfair encroachments of an Anglophone national government. He is increasingly celebrated as a proponent of multiculturalism, although that downplays his primary commitment to Métis nationalism and political independence.

The crisis rescued the Canadian Pacific Railway company, which was on the verge of financial collapse. It demonstrated its military value and earned enough Conservative political support for further funding to complete the line, thus realizing Macdonald's dream of a transcontinental railway to help unite Canada.

Suppressing the Rebellion was Canada's first independent military action. It cost about $5 million, plus millions more to complete the Canadian Pacific Railway. It guaranteed control of the Prairies and demonstrated the national government was capable of decisive action. However, it lost the Conservative Party most of their support in Quebec and led to a permanent distrust of the Anglophone community on the part of the Francophones.

== Expansion ==
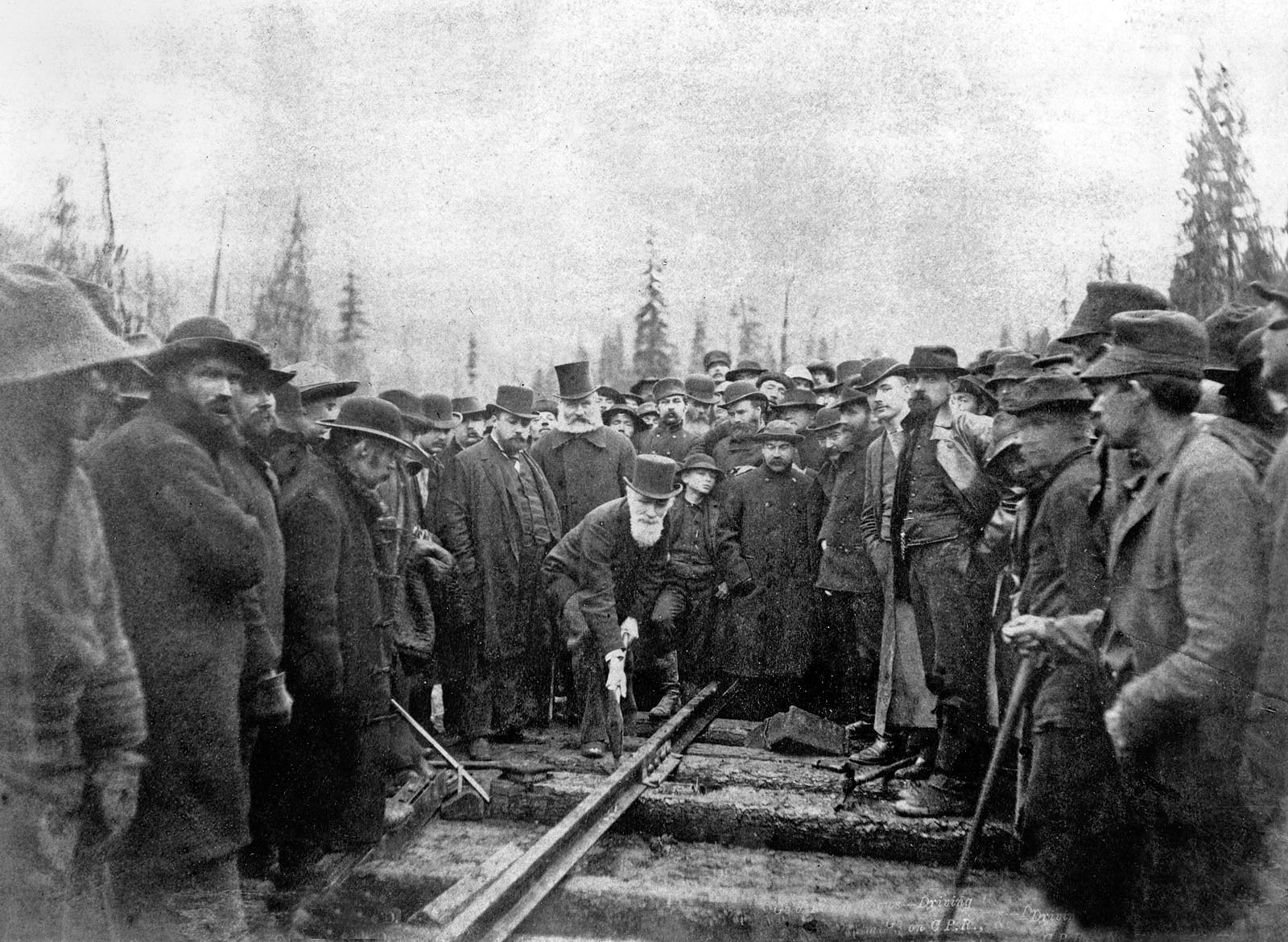
The last spike of the Canadian Pacific Railway, Craigellachie, British Columbia, November 7, 1885

In 1866, the colonies of British Columbia (formerly New Caledonia) and Vancouver's Island were united. British Columbia had been important for British control of the Pacific Ocean and was a centre of the fur trade between Britain, the United States, Russia, Spain, and China. It did not participate in the original Confederation conferences but agreed to join Canada in 1871 when Macdonald promised to build a transcontinental railroad to it. The Canadian Pacific Railway and the Dominion Land Survey were started soon after.

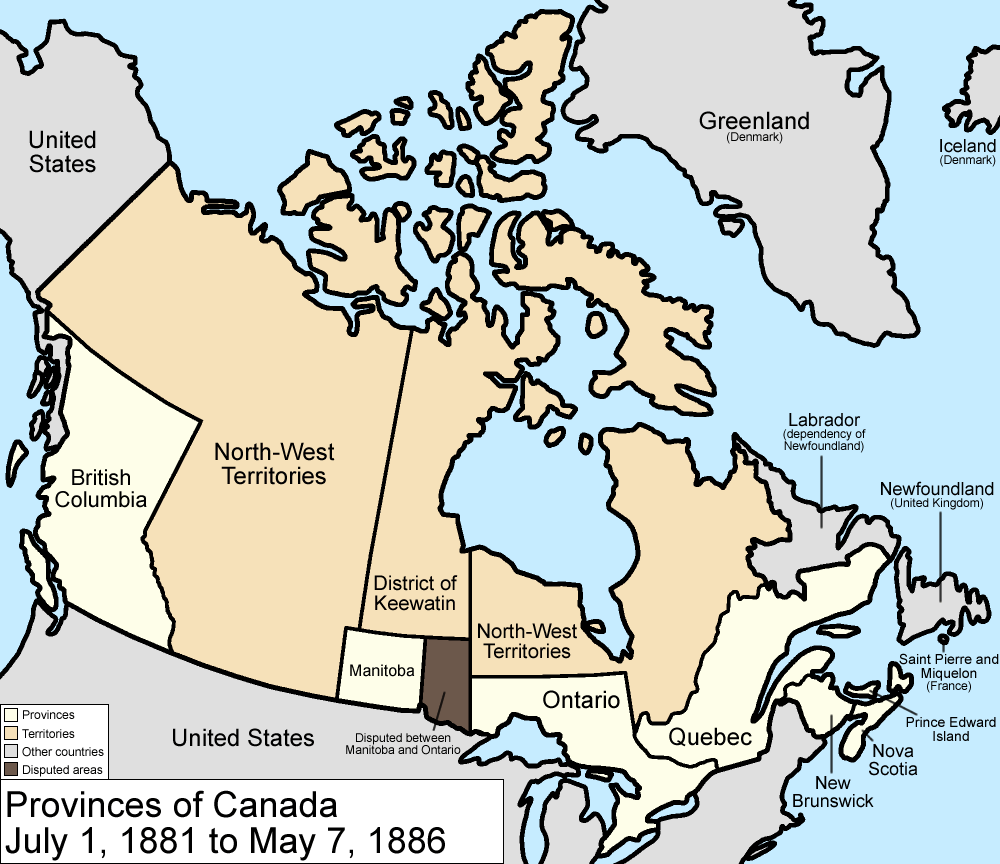
Canadian provinces, 1881–1886

In 1873, Prince Edward Island finally accepted the inducements to pay its railway debts and to buy out the last of the colony's absentee landlords. It joined the Dominion. Macdonald created the North-West Mounted Police in 1873 to help police the North-West Territories and assert Canadian independence over possible American encroachments into the sparsely populated land. The "Mounties" became legendary for keeping law and order in the West.

=== Railways ===
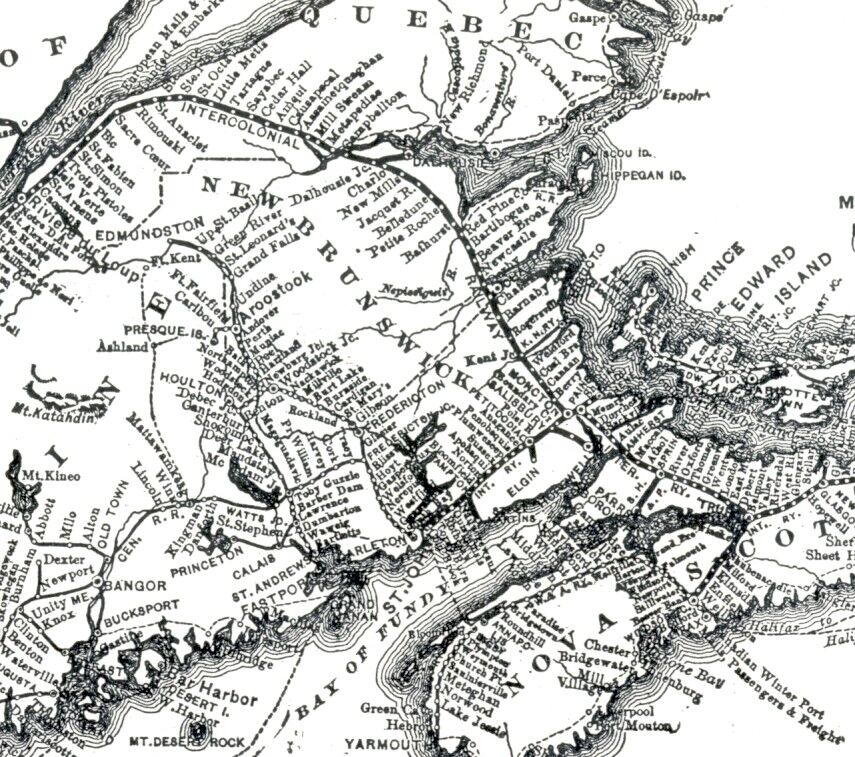
Intercolonial system map in 1877

The federal government strongly supported railway development for political goals. First, it wanted to knit the far-flung provinces together, and second, it wanted to maximize trade inside Canada and minimize trade with the United States, to avoid becoming an economic satellite. The Intercolonial Railway built 1872–1876, linked the Maritimes to Quebec and Ontario and contributed to an ice-free winter route to Britain. Diplomatically, it avoided the necessity of getting Washington's permission in wartime to ship munitions across the American state of Maine. In a larger perspective, it provided the model for a government-owned and operated railway system.

No less than three transcontinental lines were built to the west coast, but that was far more than the traffic could support, making the system simply too expensive. The priority, however, was national unity more than the national budget.

One after another, the federal government was forced to take over the lines and cover their deficits. Since most of the equipment was imported from Britain or the United States, and most of the products carried were from farms, mines or forests, there was little stimulation to manufacturing. On the other hand, the railways were essential to the growth of the wheat regions in the Prairies, and to the expansion of coal mining, lumbering, and paper-making. Improvements to the St. Lawrence waterway system continued apace, and many short lines were built to river ports.

By 1875, the government was spending a fourth of its budget on building the 4,000-kilometre-long (2,500-mile) Canadian Pacific, as well as finishing the Intercolonial. Arrangements with the Canadian Pacific Railway syndicate in 1880 brought on board the leading bankers and financiers in Canada as well as American and European bankers. Overcoming incredible geographical obstacles – rivers, swamps, mountains, and severe weather were major impediments – the line opened from Montreal to Vancouver in late 1885.

The new private syndicate started selling land through the Canada North-West Land Company, attracting settlers with model farms and promoting dry farming techniques, as well as building an irrigation system in Alberta. The railway also opened coal and lead mines, fixed establishments press service, and open telegraph lines. It created tourist hotels in the mountains, most famously at Banff and nearby Lake Louise, as well as landmark stations in major cities. The CPR built a fleet to enable fast passenger and freight service between Europe and Asia via Canada. Connections to American railways proved valuable. As the American frontier was largely closed by 1890, migrants looking to settle virgin land moved from the United States into the Prairie provinces. They shipped their wheat out by rail, and ordered supplies from Ontario.

A scandal erupted in 1873. Macdonald and the Conservative government faced a major political crisis when it was revealed that the Canadian Pacific Railway Company had helped fund Macdonald's election campaign in 1872. A new election was called in 1874, and Alexander Mackenzie became prime minister. The public's suspicion of Macdonald was overcome by 1878 when Macdonald and the Conservatives were re-elected.

=== Macdonald's "National Policy" ===
After being restored as Prime Minister, Macdonald introduced the National Policy, a system of protective tariffs meant to strengthen the Canadian economy. Part of the policy was the completion of the railroad, which would allow products to be transferred more easily across the country. It was also a response to the United States, which had a much stronger economy that threatened to overwhelm Canada; the United States had a trade reciprocity treaty with the United Province of Canada from 1854 to 1866 but abrogated the treaty before Confederation. Many people believed this policy was only beneficial to Ontario, as the Maritimes especially depended on trade with the United States. While it was somewhat beneficial for asserting Canadian independence, it was not very useful in the less industrial Maritimes and West.

=== Ontario's quest for provincial rights ===
While Macdonald may have hoped that the BNA Act would provide the central government in Ottawa with a strong hand, some of the provinces, particularly Ontario under the leadership of its premier Oliver Mowat, pushed for interpretations of the constitution that favoured provincial rather than Dominion interests. Mowat, premier from 1872 until 1896, became the "implacable enemy" of Prime Minister Macdonald as a result of a series of court decisions regarding provincial jurisdiction over liquor licences, use of streams, and mineral rights. The boundary between Ontario and Manitoba became a hotly contested matter, with the federal government attempting to extend Manitoba's jurisdiction eastward to the Great Lakes, into the areas that Ontario claimed. In 1882 Premier Mowat threatened to pull Ontario from Confederation over the issue. Mowat sent police into the disputed territory to assert Ontario's claims, while Manitoba (at the behest of the national government) did the same. The Judicial Committee of the Privy Council in Britain, serving as Canada's highest appeal court, repeatedly issued rulings taking the side of provincial rights. These decisions would to some extent neutralize the power of the central government, creating a more decentralized federation. John Ibbitson writes that by 1914:

Confederation had evolved into a creation beyond John A. Macdonald's worst nightmare. Powerful, independent provinces, sovereign within their own spheres, manipulated the rights of property, levied their own taxes—even income taxes, in a few cases—exploited their natural resources, and managed schools, hospitals, and relief for the poor, while a weak and ineffectual central government presided over not much of anything in the drab little capital on the banks of the Ottawa.

=== The Manitoba Schools Question ===
After the Red River Rebellion and the entrance of Manitoba into Confederation, settlers from English Canada arrived in the new province in greater numbers. In 1890, the provincial government passed the Manitoba Schools Act, abolishing government funding for Catholic schools and abolishing French as an official language - contrary to the Manitoba Act that created the province. This led to another federal political crisis, and by 1896, Prime Minister Mackenzie Bowell was forced to resign. Wilfrid Laurier, a Catholic from Quebec, became prime minister. Laurier developed a compromise stating that French would be used in schools when there were a significant number of French-speaking students; this compromise was denounced by both sides but was recognized as the only possible solution. However, along with the execution of Louis Riel, the Manitoba Schools Question led to an increase of French Canadian nationalism.

== Immigration to the West ==
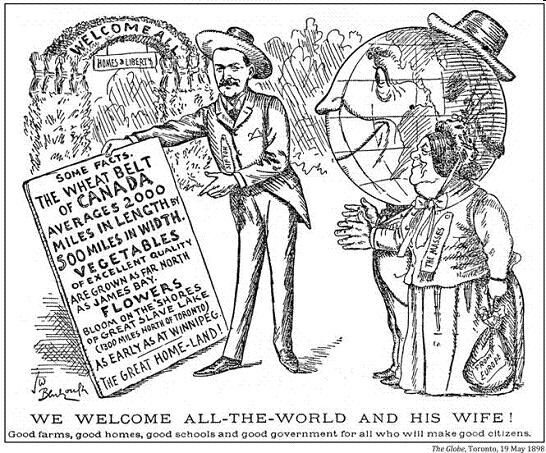
Canada sought immigrants from Europe, especially farmers; cartoon by John Wilson Bengough from Toronto Globe May 19, 1898

While the National Policy, CPR and Dominion Lands Act had been in place for several decades, mass immigration to Canada's prairie regions only got underway around 1896. Why it began then is a matter of debate among historians. John Dales argued that it was a combination of rising wheat prices, cheaper ocean transport costs, technological change, new varieties of wheat, and the scarcity of land in the United States. Norry does not view any of these developments as being important and instead argues that new methods of dry farming lead to the breakthrough. Recently, Ward had argued that technological change was the most important factor, with a number of different inventions becoming cheap and reliable enough to be widely used around this period. The period of western settlement was one of the most prosperous in Canadian history. From 1896 to 1911, Canada had the world's fastest-growing economy. Immigration from Eastern Europe and the eastern parts of the former Austro-Hungarian empire brought many old-world farmers to settle the west and despite their lack of knowledge of the English language, many adapted quickly to the farming environment which was somewhat similar to their original homelands.

=== Klondike Gold Rush ===
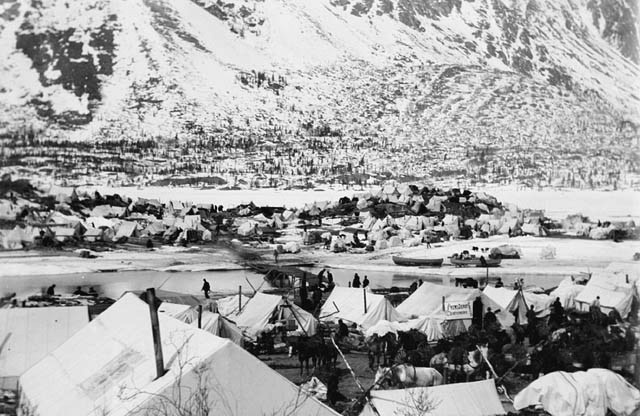
Miners' camp at the head of the Yukon River

In August 1896, a party led by Skookum Jim Mason discovered gold on a tributary of the Klondike River. After the discovery was publicized in 1897, an estimated 30,000 to 40,000 people braved numerous hardships to reach the Klondike goldfields in the winter and spring of 1897–98. With the influx of American stampeders, the government decided to relieve the North-West Territories' administration from the task of controlling the sudden boom of population, economic activity and influx of non-Canadians. On June 13, 1898, the Yukon became a separate territory. In 1901, after many had gone back, the Census put the population of the territory at 27,219, a figure that was not reached again until 1991. The influx of people greatly stimulated mineral exploration in other parts of the Yukon and led to two subsidiary gold rushes in Atlin, British Columbia and Nome, Alaska as well as a number of mini-rushes. Transportation needs to the goldfields led to the construction of the White Pass and Yukon Route.

=== Alaska boundary dispute ===
The precise Alaska-Canada boundary became important when gold was discovered in the Klondike. Miners had to enter through American Alaska to get there. Canada wanted its own Pacific port and rejected American offers to lease it one. Instead, it claimed its historic boundary with Russian Alaska included the Lynn Canal and the port of Skagway, both occupied by the U.S. The dispute went to arbitration in 1903 but, to the anger of Canadians, the British delegate sided with the Americans. It was a matter of ensuring good relations between London and Washington, at the expense of Canada. The resentment contributed to the defeat of Wilfrid Laurier and his Liberal Party in the 1911 election as they proposed a reciprocal trade treaty with the U.S. that would lower tariff barriers.

=== Rising Anti-Asian sentiment in British Columbia ===
Exclusionist cartoon in Saturday Sunset magazine, (Vancouver, August 24, 1907.) Oriental immigrants were despised (right); white immigrants were welcomed (left).

Prior to 1885, restrictions on immigration were imposed mostly in response to large waves of immigration rather than planned policy decisions, but not specifically targeted at one group or ethnicity, at least as official policy. Then came the introduction of the first Chinese Head Tax legislation passed in 1885, which was in response to a growing number of Chinese working on the Canadian Pacific Railway. Northwestern European Canadians in British Columbia grew increasingly fearful and angry about immigration from Asia that they perceived threatened their jobs and the British culture and standard of living in B.C. Problems such as opium smoking were of particular concern. In 1886, a head tax was imposed on the Chinese, with subsequent increases in 1900 and 1903 which limited Chinese immigration to Canada. The head reached as much as $500 per person to enter Canada by 1904.

After initial waves of immigration to British Columbia beginning in 1897, South Asian (primarily Punjabi Sikhs) settlers had to face an amended Immigration Act in 1908 that required Indians to have $200 on arrival in Canada, and immigration would be allowed only if the passenger had arrived by continuous journey from India, which was impossible. A year prior in 1907, provincial disenfranchisement hit South Asians in British Columbia who were thus denied the federal vote and access to political office, jury duty, professions, public-service jobs, and labour on public works.

Similar to prior riots in 1887, a major riot against East Asian Canadians took place in Vancouver, BC in 1907, days after a similar riot in Bellingham targeted South Asians. A mob of English-Canadian rioters attacked East Asian Canadian businesses but met stiff resistance from the Japanese community. Further anti-Asian sentiment was witnessed in 1914 when the Komagata Maru arrived in Vancouver with 376 Punjabis (337 Sikhs, 27 Muslims and 12 Hindus) aboard, but only 24 were admitted and the ship was ultimately forced back to India. By 1923 the dominion government passed the Chinese Immigration Act, which prohibited all Chinese immigration until it was repealed in 1947. In 1942, Japanese Canadians were rounded up and sent to inland camps for the duration of the war.

Asian-Canadians were finally given equal status and the vote in 1947. For discriminating against Chinese settlers and immigrants in past periods, an official government apology and compensations were announced on June 22, 2006. Furthermore, in 2016, the Canadian government issued a full apology in parliament for discriminating against would-be South Asian settlers and immigrants during the Komagata Maru Incident.

== Popular culture ==
Canadians in the 19th century came to believe themselves possessed of a unique "northern character", due to the long, harsh winters that only those of hardy body and mind could survive. This hardiness was claimed as a Canadian trait, and such sports as ice hockey and snowshoeing that reflected this were asserted as characteristically Canadian. Outside the arena Canadians express the national characteristics of being peaceful, orderly and polite. Inside they scream their lungs out at ice hockey games, cheering the speed, ferocity, and violence, making hockey an ambiguous symbol of Canada. Nevertheless, the most popular sport was baseball, one shared with the U.S. and promoted especially by the Irish Catholics in the cities.

== Laurier and Canada's role in the Empire ==
Laurier hoped to unite French and English Canada in a unique sense of Canadian nationalism, rather than remain unquestionably loyal to Britain. Along with some Americans, he also hoped for a shift of focus towards North America, a policy often known as "continentalism." However, in 1899, the British immediately assumed Canada would send military support to the Boer War in South Africa, and there was indeed enormous support for military action from English Canada. French Canada was strongly opposed to military support for Britain's imperialist wars. The opposition was led by Henri Bourassa, who, like Laurier, preferred a united, independent Canada. Bourassa denounced Laurier when Laurier eventually decided to allow a volunteer force to fight in the war, even though the other option would have been calling up an official army.

As Prime Minister, Laurier successfully brought Saskatchewan and Alberta into Confederation in 1905, carving those provinces out of the Northwest Territories. He felt Canada was on the verge of becoming a world power and declared that the 20th century would "belong to Canada". However, he faced even more criticism when he introduced the Naval Service Act in 1910. It was meant to make Canada less dependent on Britain and British imperialism, but Bourassa believed the British would now call on the Canadian navy whenever it was needed, just as they did with the Canadian army. Pro-British imperialists were also opposed to the attempt to remove Canada from the Empire. The Naval Service Bill led to Laurier's downfall in the election of 1911. Conservatives led by Robert Laird Borden attacked reciprocity with the United States, warning that strong economic links would weaken the Empire and allow the neighbour to increasingly take over the economy.

British politicians at the time and historians ever since have explored whether the British Empire was too expensive for the British budget. Joseph Chamberlain thought so but he had little success at the Imperial Conference of 1902 asking overseas partners to increase their contribution. Canada and Australia spoke of funding a warship—the Canadian Senate voted it down in 1913. Meanwhile, the Royal Navy adjusted its war plans to focus on Germany, economizing on defending against lesser threats in peripheral areas such as the Pacific and Indian Oceans. Defending Canada was a low priority.

== See also ==
- Heritage Minutes
- British North America
- Canadian Confederation
