= Bellechaume =

- Commune
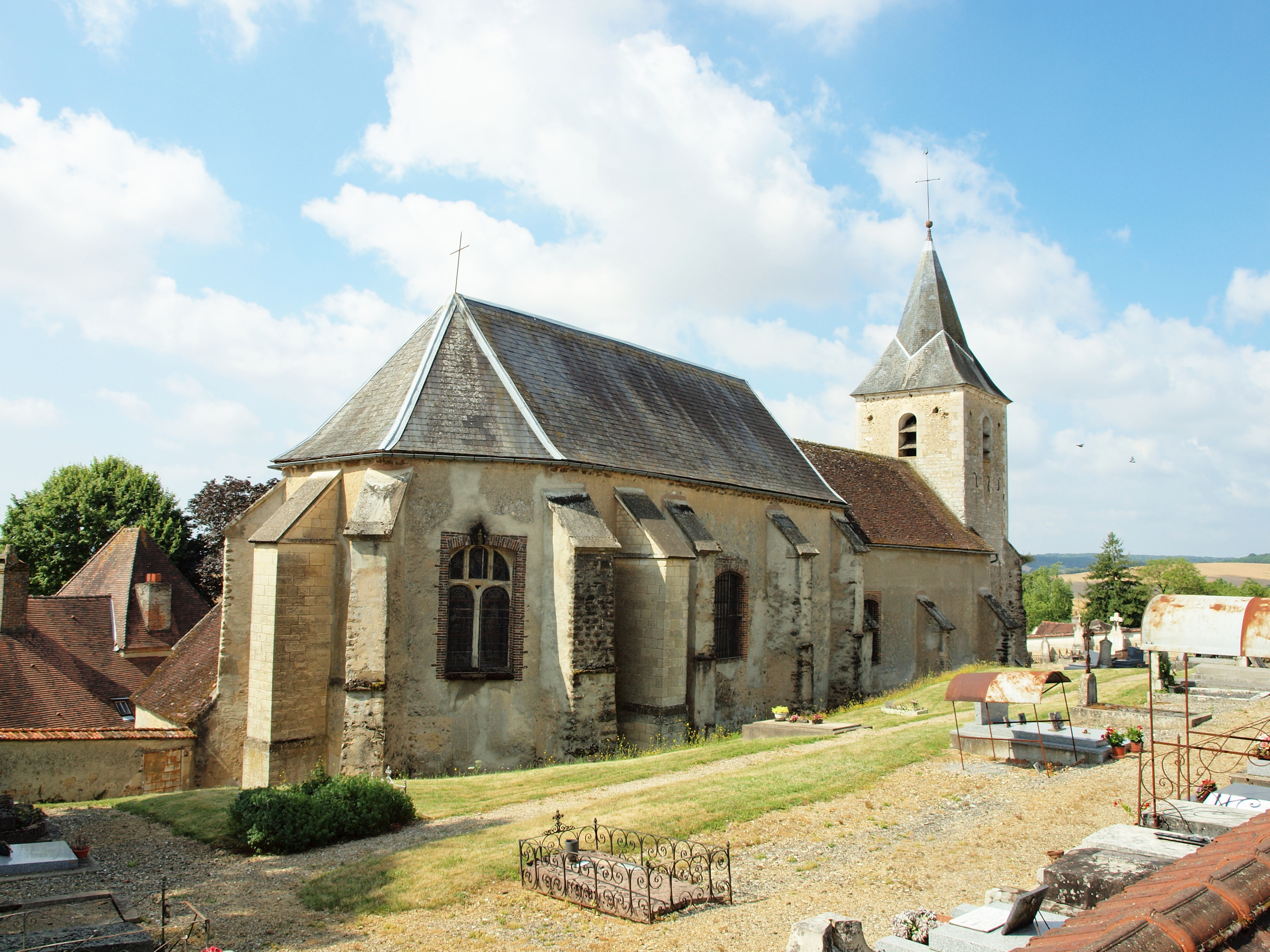
- The church in Bellechaume

- Coat of arms
- Location of Bellechaume
- Location within France Location within Bourgogne-Franche-Comté
- Coordinates: 48°02′37″N 3°36′32″E
- Country: France
- Region: Bourgogne-Franche-Comté
- Department: Yonne
- Arrondissement: Auxerre
- Canton: Brienon-sur-Armançon

Government
  - Mayor (2020–2026): Jean-Luc Delagneau
- Area^{1}: 24.51 km^{2} (9.46 sq mi)
- Highest elevation: 289 m (948 ft)
- Lowest elevation: 119 m (390 ft)
- Population (2023): 436
  - Density: 17.8/km^{2} (46.1/sq mi)
- Time zone: UTC+01:00 (CET)
  - Summer (DST): UTC+02:00 (CEST)
- INSEE/Postal code: 89035 /89210
- ^{1} French Land Register data, which excludes lakes, ponds, glaciers > 1 km^{2} (0.386 sq mi or 247 acres) and river estuaries.

Bellechaume (French pronunciation: [bɛlʃom]) is a commune in the Yonne department in Bourgogne-Franche-Comté in north-central France.

== See also ==
- Communes of the Yonne department
