= Kemal Cenap Berksoy =

Turkish politician

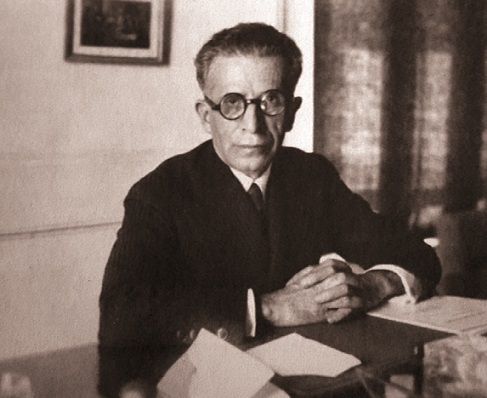

Member of the Turkish Grand National Assembly for Istanbul
- In office 8 March 1943 – 5 August 1946

Member of the Turkish Grand National Assembly for Yozgat
- In office 5 August 1946 – 28 November 1949

Personal details
- Born: 1875 Constantinople
- Died: 28 November 1949 (aged 73–74)

Kemal Cenap Berksoy (1875 – 28 November 1949) was a Turkish politician and physician.

He graduated from the Turkish Military Medicine school. He was also a distinguished (Turkish: Ordinaryüs) professor. He became a deputy from Istanbul for the 7th parliament and from Yozgat for the 8th parliament in the Grand National Assembly of Turkey. He had two children.
