= List of nominees for the Nobel Prize in Physiology or Medicine (1901–1909) =

The following is a list of people first nominated for the Nobel Prize in Physiology or Medicine between 1901 and 1909 by year of first nomination.

The Nobel Prize in Physiology or Medicine (Swedish: Nobelpriset i fysiologi eller medicin) is awarded annually by the Nobel Assembly at the Karolinska Institute to scientists who have made outstanding contributions in physiology or medicine. It is one of the five Nobel Prizes which were established by the will of Alfred Nobel in 1895.

Every year, the Nobel Committee for Physiology or Medicine sends out forms, which amount to a personal and exclusive invitation, to about three thousand selected individuals to invite them to submit nominations. The names of the nominees are never publicly announced, and neither are they told that they have been considered for the Prize. Nomination records are strictly sealed for fifty years. However, the nominations for the years 1901 to 1953 are publicly available. Despite the annual sending of invitations, the prize was not awarded in nine years (1915–1918, 1921, 1925, 1940–1942) and has been delayed for a year five times (1919, 1922, 1926, 1938, 1943).

From 1901 to 1953, 935 scientists were nominated for the prize, 63 of which were awarded either jointly or individually. 19 more scientists from these nominees were awarded after 1953. Of the 13 women nominees, only G.Th.Cori was awarded the prize. Besides some scientists from these nominees won the prizes in other fields (including years after 1953): J.Boyd Orr - Peace Prize (1949); L.C.Pauling twice - in Chemistry (1954) and Peace Prize (1962); 3 - in Physics and 20 - in Chemistry (including Fr.Sanger twice - in 1958 and 1980).

In addition, nominations of 65 scientists (including one woman) were declared invalid by the Nobel Committee.

== See also ==
- List of nominees for the Nobel Prize in Physiology or Medicine (1910–1919)
- List of nominees for the Nobel Prize in Physiology or Medicine (1920–1929)
- List of nominees for the Nobel Prize in Physiology or Medicine (1930–1939)
- List of nominees for the Nobel Prize in Physiology or Medicine (1940–1949)
- List of nominees for the Nobel Prize in Physiology or Medicine (1950–1959)

== 1901–1909 ==
Picture	Name	Born	Died	Years nominated	Notes
1901
	Emil von Behring (Note: "Discovery of serum therapy against diphtheria")	15 March 1854 Hansdorf, Kreis Rosenberg in Westpreußen, German Confederation	31 March 1917 Marburg, German Empire	1901, 1902	Won the 1901 Nobel Prize in Physiology or Medicine (Note: "for his work on serum therapy, especially its application against diphtheria, by which he has opened a new road in the domain of medical science and thereby placed in the hands of the physician a victorious weapon against illness and deaths")
	Kitasato Shibasaburō	29 January 1853 Oguni, Kumamoto, Japan	13 June 1931 Tokyo, Japan	1901	Nominated jointly (Note: "Discovery of the tetanus antitoxin. Kitasako also discovered the plague bacillus, independently of Yersin") with Emil von Behring by Árp.Bókay the only time First Asian nominated for the Nobel Prize in Physiology or Medicine
	Ronald Ross (Note: "His discovery of the development of the malaria parasite in the body of the mosquito, an observation of immense practical and scientific importance")	13 May 1857 Almora, Uttarakhand, India	16 September 1932 London, England, United Kingdom	1901, 1902, 1904	Won the 1902 Nobel Prize in Physiology or Medicine (Note: "for his work on malaria, by which he has shown how it enters the organism and thereby has laid the foundation for successful research on this disease and methods of combating it")
	Niels Ryberg Finsen (Note: "Treatment of Lupus vulgaris with concentrated light (phototherapy)")	15 December 1860 Tórshavn, Faroe Islands, Danish Realm	24 September 1904 Copenhagen, Denmark	1901, 1902, 1903, 1904	Won the 1903 Nobel Prize in Physiology or Medicine (Note: "in recognition of his contribution to the treatment of diseases, especially lupus vulgaris, with concentrated light radiation, whereby he has opened a new avenue for medical science")
	Ivan Pavlov (Note: "Work on secretion and the physiology of the digestive glands")	26 September 1849 Ryazan, Russian Empire	27 February 1936 Leningrad, Russia	1901, 1902, 1903, 1904, 1905, 1925, 1927, 1929, 1930, 1934, 1937	Won the 1904 Nobel Prize in Physiology or Medicine (Note: "in recognition of his work on the physiology of digestion, through which knowledge on vital aspects of the subject has been transformed and enlarged")
	Robert Koch (Note: "Work on malaria, and older work on anthrax, cholera and tuberculosis")	11 December 1843 Clausthal, Kingdom of Hanover, German Confederation	27 May 1910 Baden-Baden, German Empire	1901, 1902, 1903, 1904, 1905, 1906	Won the 1905 Nobel Prize in Physiology or Medicine (Note: "for his investigations and discoveries in relation to tuberculosis")
	Santiago Ramón y Cajal (Note: "Studies of the cerebral cortex, and localization of function in the brain")	1 May 1852 Petilla de Aragón, Spain	17 October 1934 Madrid, Spain	1901, 1902, 1903, 1904, 1905, 1906, 1907	Shared the 1906 Nobel Prize in Physiology or Medicine (Note: "in recognition of their work on the structure of the nervous system")
	Camillo Golgi (Note: "Extensive work on the central nervous system; mixed (chrome/silver) method of staining nerve cells")	7 July 1843 Corteno Golgi, Kingdom of Lombardy–Venetia	21 January 1926 Pavia, Italy	1901, 1902, 1903, 1904, 1905, 1906, 1907	Shared the 1906 Nobel Prize in Physiology or Medicine
	Giuseppe Muscatello (Note: "Spinal bifida, post-operative Hydrocephalie")	10 November 1866 Augusta, Kingdom of the Two Sicilies	2 August 1951 Catania, Italy	1901	Nominated with C.Golgi by Fr.D.von Recklinghausen the only time
	Alphonse Laveran (Note: "Discovery of the malaria parasite, and further work on the disease")	18 June 1845 Paris, France	18 May 1922 Paris, France	1901, 1902, 1903, 1904, 1905, 1906, 1907, 1908	Won the 1907 Nobel Prize in Physiology or Medicine (Note: "in recognition of his work on the role played by protozoa in causing diseases")
	Élie Metchnikoff (Note: "His enormous work in physiology and general pathology")	16 May 1845 Ivanovka, Kharkov Governorate, Russian Empire	15 July 1916 Paris, France	1901, 1902, 1903, 1904, 1905, 1906, 1907, 1908, 1909	Shared the 1908 Nobel Prize in Physiology or Medicine (Note: "in recognition of their work on immunity") P.Ehrlich was nominated for Nobel Prize in Chemistry too. (Note: "Work on salvarsan")
	Paul Ehrlich (Note: "Work on immunity, especially his work on the toxins ricin and abrin; work on diphtheria; studies of blood cells")	14 March 1854 Strehlen, Kingdom of Prussia, German Confederation	20 August 1915 Bad Homburg, German Empire	1901, 1902, 1903, 1904, 1905, 1906, 1907, 1908, 1909, 1912, 1913	Shared the 1908 Nobel Prize in Physiology or Medicine P.Ehrlich was nominated for Nobel Prize in Chemistry too.
	Emil Algot Holmgren (Note: "Anatomical studies of the fine structure of the nervous system ("Studien zur feineren Anatomy der Nervenzellen", Bonnet-Merkel´s Anatomische Hefte, Bd. 15, pp. 7–89, 1900)")	14 May 1866 Stockholm, Sweden	22 October 1922 Stockholm, Sweden	1901	Nominated jointly by W.Flemming the only time
	Ivar Broman (Note: "Work on the composition and structure of the Batrach sperm ("Bidrag till Kännedomen om Batrachierne-Spermiernes Byggnad", E. Malmström, Lund, SE, 1900)")	18 September 1868 Hörby, Sweden	11 May 1946 Lund, Sweden	1901	Nominated jointly by W.Flemming the only time
	Eduard Lang (Note: "Surgical treatment of Lupus vulgaris by excision of lupus and extensive transplantaion")	1 May 1841 Nemsó, Slovakia	9 June 1916 Reichenau an der Rax, Austria-Hungary	1901	Nominated by Roberto Campana (5.8.1844 Teramo – 13.1.1919 Rome)(id=1560) the only time (Note: Second choice after N.R.Finsen)
	Wilhelm Camerer (Note: "Extensive studies of metabolism in children")	17 October 1842 Stuttgart, Kingdom of Württemberg, German Confederation	25 March 1910 Bad Urach, German Empire	1901	Nominated by Otto Heubner the only time
	Gustav von Hüfner (Note: "Quantitative determination of pigmented components in blood, using a spectrophotometer (Über die gleichzeitige quantitative Bestimmung zweier Farbstoffe im Blute mit Hülfe des Spectrophotometers", Arch. f. Anat. u. Physiol.; Physiol. Abth p. 39, 1899)")	13 May 1840 Bad Köstritz, Imperial County of Reuss, German Confederation	14 March 1908 Tübingen, German Empire	1901	Nominated by Osw.Schmiedeberg the only time
	Albrecht Heinr	24 July 1866 Vienna, Austrian Empire	28 June 1922 Vienna, Austria	1901	Jointly (Note: "Study of the pathological anatomy and histology of bubonic plague, and on the bacteriology of the plague bacillus, based on work carried out in Bombay, India from 1897–1900") nominated only.
	Anton Ghon	1 January 1866 Villach, Duchy of Carinthia, Austrian Empire	23 April 1936 Prague, Czechia	1901	Jointly nominated only.
	Richard Thoma (Note: "Work on arteriosclerosis")	11 December 1847 Bonndorf im Schwarzwald, Baden, German Confederation	26 November 1923 Heidelberg, Weimar Germany	1901	Nominated by L.Schrötter R.von Kristelli the only time
	Vilmos Schulek (Note: "Work on the effect of ultraviolet rays on the eye, and construction of protective lenses, "Schutzbrillen"")	21 April 1843 Pest, Kingdom of Hungary	13 March 1905 Budapest, Austria-Hungary	1901	
	Josef von Fodor (Note: "Discovery of the bacteriocidal effect of the blood; effect of alkali substances on the immune system after injection into the bloodstream")	16 July 1843 Lakócsa, Kingdom of Hungary	20 March 1901 Budapest, Austria-Hungary	1901	Died before the only chance to be rewarded
	Endre Hőgyes (Note: "Prophylactic treatment of rabies")	30 November 1847 Hajdúszoboszló, Kingdom of Hungary	8 September 1906 Budapest, Austria-Hungary	1901, 1902	
	Carl Gegenbaur (Note: "Work in human anatomy, and publication of textbooks ("Handbuch der vergleichenden Anatomie der Wirbelthiere mit Berücksichtigung der Wirbellosen", 1898; "Das Kopfskelett der Selachier", 1877; and "Lehrbuch der Anatomie des Menschen")")	21 August 1826 Würzburg, Kingdom of Bavaria, German Confederation	14 June 1903 Heidelberg, German Empire	1901, 1902	
	Rudolf Virchow (Note: "His importance to modern medicine. Work on leukemia, and in pathology")	13 October 1821 Schivelbein, Kingdom of Prussia, German Confederation	5 September 1902 Berlin, German Empire	1901, 1902, 1903	
	Carl von Voit (Note: "Work on metabolism, and the practical use of this knowledge in planning diets for soldiers and prisoners ("Physiologie des allgem Stoffwechsels und der Ernährung", 1881, Vol. VI in Hermann´s "Handbuch d. Physiologie")")	31 October 1831 Amberg, Kingdom of Bavaria, German Confederation	31 January 1908 Munich, German Empire	1901, 1902, 1903, 1906	
	Lyder Borthen (Note: "Work on diseases of the eye in lepers, as published in his work "Die Lepra des Auges"")	4 May 1849 Trondheim, Norway	8 December 1924 Trondheim, Norway	1901, 1903	
	Bernhard Bang (Note: "Work on treating tuberculosis in livestock")	7 June 1848 Sorø, Denmark	22 June 1932 Copenhagen, Denmark	1901, 1903	
	Wilhelm His Sr. (Note: "Work in embryology, especially on the neuroblast, and the structure of the protoplasm")	9 July 1831 Basel, Switzerland	1 May 1904 Leipzig, German Empire	1901, 1904	
	Albert von Kölliker (Note: "A 60 year career in anatomy. Work on the fine structure of the nervous system")	6 July 1817 Zurich, Switzerland	2 November 1905 Würzburg, German Empire	1901, 1905	
	Theodor Wilhelm Engelmann (Note: "Physiology of the nervous system in relation to the function of the heart")	14 November 1843 Leipzig, Kingdom of Saxony, German Confederation	20 May 1909 Berlin, German Empire	1901, 1902, 1903, 1906	
	Alexandre Yersin (Note: "Work on serum against plague ("La peste bubonique", Yersin, Calmette, Barrel, Annal de l´Institut Pasteur 1895, p. 589)")	22 September 1863 Aubonne, Switzerland	1 March 1943 Nha Trang, Khánh Hòa, Vietnam	1901, 1902, 1904, 1908	
	Joseph Lister (Note: "Antiseptic and aseptic wound treatment")	5 April 1827 Newham, West Ham, England	10 February 1912 Walmer, Kent, England	1901, 1902, 1903, 1904, 1906, 1907, 1909, 1910	
	Charles Jacques Bouchard (Note: "For his work in general pathology and its effect on the development of clinical medicine")	6 September 1837 Haute-Marne, France	28 October 1915 Sainte-Foy-lès-Lyon, France	1901, 1904, 1905, 1906, 1907, 1908, 1909, 1910, 1911, 1912, 1913, 1914, 1915, 1916	
	Gustaf Retzius (Note: "Work on the sensory organs, and the nervous system of lower vertebrates and crustaceans")	17 October 1842 Stockholm, Sweden	21 July 1919 Stockholm, Sweden	1901, 1902, 1904, 1907, 1908, 1909, 1910, 1912, 1913, 1915, 1916	
	Patrick Manson (Note: "his successful work Showing the role played by the Mosquito in connexion with the production of Malarial Fever by the transmission of the Malarial Fever parasite.")	3 October 1844 Oldmeldrum, Scotland	9 April 1922 London, England	1901, 1902, 1904, 1910, 1911, 1912, 1921	
	Henry Head (Note: "The pathology of Herpes Zoster and its bearing on sensory localization ("Die Sensibilitätsstörung der Haut bei Visceralerkrankungen")")	4 August 1861 Stoke Newington, Middlesex, England	8 October 1940 Reading, Berkshire, England	1901, 1919, 1920, 1921	
	Jacques Loeb (Note: "For his work in general on physiological morphology, and in particular his work on artificial parthenogenesis")	7 April 1859 Mayen, Kingdom of Prussia, German Confederation	11 February 1924 Hamilton, Bermuda British Empire	1901, 1902, 1905, 1906, 1907, 1909, 1910, 1911, 1912, 1913, 1914, 1915, 1917, 1918, 1919, 1920, 1921, 1922, 1923, 1924	
	Giuseppe Bastianelli	25 October 1862 Rome, Papal States	30 March 1959 Rome, Italy	1901, 1902, 1905	Nominated jointly (Note: "For their work in elucidating the cause of malaria") with G.B.Grassi only.
	Amico Bignami	15 April 1862 Bologna, Kingdom of Italy	8 September 1929 Rome, Kingdom of Italy	1901, 1902, 1905	Nominated jointly with G.B.Grassi only.
	Giovanni Battista Grassi (Note: "Work on malaria")	27 March 1854 Rovellasca, Kingdom of Lombardy–Venetia	4 May 1925 Rome, Kingdom of Italy	1901, 1902, 1903, 1904, 1905, 1907, 1910, 1911, 1912, 1913, 1914, 1925	
	John Newport Langley (Note: "The physiology of the sympathetic nervous system: discovery of the nicotine method of studying cell connections of sympathetic fibers; connections and function of the nerves supplying the pelvic viscera; demonstration of "axon reflexes"")	2 November 1852 Newbury, England	5 November 1925 Cambridge, England	1901, 1905, 1907, 1908, 1910, 1911, 1912, 1914, 1916, 1918, 1919, 1920, 1924, 1925	
	Émile Roux (Note: "Work on serum against diphtheria, as described in Annales de l´Institut Pasteur")	17 December 1853 Confolens, France	3 November 1933 Paris, France	1901, 1902, 1903, 1904, 1905, 1906, 1907, 1908, 1909, 1910, 1911, 1912, 1913, 1914, 1915, 1916, 1917, 1919, 1920, 1921, 1922, 1923, 1924, 1925, 1932	
	Alexander von Korányi (Note: "Determination of the molecular concentration (by freeze-point studies) of bodily fluids (blood, urine), and work on the clinical applications of this knowledge")	18 June 1866 Pest, Kingdom of Hungary	12 April 1944 Budapest, Hungary	1901, 1902, 1931, 1937	
1902
	Albrecht Kossel (Note: "Work on physiological chemistry")	16 September 1853 Rostock, Grand Duchy of Mecklenburg-Schwerin, German Confederation	5 July 1927 Heidelberg, Weimar Germany	1902, 1903, 1904, 1905, 1909, 1910	Won the 1910 Nobel Prize in Physiology or Medicine (Note: "in recognition of the contributions to our knowledge of cell chemistry made through his work on proteins, including the nucleic substances") and nominated for Nobel Prize in Chemistry too.
	Jules Bordet (Note: "Work on agglutination and hemolysis")	13 June 1870 Soignies, Belgium	6 April 1961 Brussels, Belgium	1902, 1905, 1908, 1909, 1910, 1911, 1912, 1913, 1914, 1915, 1916, 1917, 1918, 1919, 1920, 1921	Won the 1919 Nobel Prize in Physiology or Medicine a year later (Note: "for his discoveries relating to immunity")
	Charles Scott Sherrington (Note: "Work on the central nervous system, including peripheral distribution of the fibers of nerve roots, termination of sensory fibers in muscle, conditions of muscle tonus, distribution of nerve cells in the spinal cord and the course and origin of nerve tracts in the spinal cord and medulla oblongata")	27 November 1857 Islington, Middlesex, England	4 March 1952 Eastbourne, Sussex, England	1902, 1906, 1907, 1909, 1910, 1911, 1912, 1913, 1914, 1915, 1916, 1917, 1918, 1919, 1920, 1921, 1922, 1923, 1925, 1926, 1927, 1928, 1929, 1930, 1931, 1932	Shared the 1932 Nobel Prize in Physiology or Medicine (Note: "for their discoveries regarding the functions of neurons") with Edgar Adrian
	Eduard Buchner (Note: "Discovery of Zymase (fermentation can be induced by an enzyme, even in yeast cells which have been destroyed)")	20 May 1860 Munich, Kingdom of Bavaria, German Confederation	13 August 1917 Focșani, Romania	1902, 1904, 1906	Won the 1907 Nobel Prize in Chemistry. (Note: "for his biochemical researches and his discovery of cell-free fermentation")
	Alexandre Desgrez	15 July 1863 Bannes, France	20 January 1940 Mennecy, France	1902 (Note: "Invention of an apparatus, using sodium bioxide, which allows a man to breathe for extended periods with a small amount of air")	Nominated by Ch.J.Bouchard the only time
	Victor Balthazard	1852 (1872?) Paris, France	24 December 1950 Ciboure, France	1902	Nominated by Ch.J.Bouchard the only time
	Césaire Phisalix (Note: "Discovery of a vaccine using non-bacterial components")	8 October 1852 Mouthier-Haute-Pierre, France	16 March 1906 Paris, France	1902	Nominated by Ch.J.Bouchard the only time
	James Israel	2 February 1848 Berlin, Kingdom of Prussia, German Confederation	2 February 1926 Berlin, Weimar Germany	1902	Nominated jointly (Note: "Work on surgery of the kidney (J. Israel: "der Nieren-chirurgie", Berlin, 1901. U. Kroenlein: "Zwanzig Jahre Nierenchirurgie aus der Züricher Chirurgischen Klinik", Beiträgefür kliniche Chirurgie XXXII b. Laupp, Tübingen)") by Oscar Wyss-Kienast (17 August 1840, Dietikon – 1 May 1918, Zürich) the only time
	Rudolf Ulrich Krönlein	19 February 1847 Stein am Rhein, Switzerland	26 October 1910 Zurich, Switzerland	1902	Nominated jointly by Oscar Wyss-Kienast (17 August 1840, Dietikon – 1 May 1918, Zürich) the only time
	Richard Geeff (Note: "work on the physiology and pathological anatomy of the eye")	18 June 1862 Elberfeld, Kingdom of Prussia, German Confederation	4 November 1938 Berlin, Nazi Germany	1902	Nominated by Schweiger the only time
	Domenico Lo Monaco	31 July 1863 Bagheria, Kingdom of Italy	19 April 1930 Rome, Kingdom of Italy	1902 (Note: "studies of the effects of quinine on the malaria parasite")	Nominated by L.Luciani the only time
	Luigi Panichi	Italy	Italy	1902	Nominated by L.Luciani the only time
	Antonio Dionisi (Note: "work on inoculation against malaria")	29 April 1866	19 September 1931	1902	Nominated by L.Luciani the only time
	Eduard Pflüger (Note: "Work in the field of physiology (electrotonus, reflexes, respiration), and especially his work on metabolism")	7 June 1829 Hanau, Electorate of Hesse, German Confederation	16 March 1910 Bonn, German Empire	1902, 1903, 1904, 1905, 1906, 1907, 1908, 1909, 1910	
	Carl Rabl (Note: "Research on the structure and development of the lens ("über den Bau und die Entwickelung der Linse", Zeitschrift für wissenschaftliche Zoologie, Bd 63, 65, 67, 1898–1899); studies on the evolution of the extremities ("Gedanken und Studien über den Ursprung der Extremitäten", Zeitschrift für wissenschaftliche Zoologie, Bd 70, 1901), and on the mesoderm")	2 May 1853 Wels, Austrian Empire	24 December 1917 Leipzig, German Empire	1902, 1905, 1910	Nominated by H.Chiari only
	Ernst Haeckel (Note: "Work on the morphology of organisms, and studies to further the theory of evolution. Classification based on the gastrulation process ("die Gastraeatheorie, die phylogenetische Classification des Thierreichs u. die Homologie der Keimblätter", Jen. Zeitschr. Bd. VIII, 1874; "Die Gastrula u. die Eifurchung der Thiere" Ebenda Bd. IX; "Nachträge zur Gasträatheorie". Ebenda Bd. XI)")	16 February 1834 Potsdam, Kingdom of Prussia, German Confederation	9 August 1919 Jena, Weimar Germany	1902, 1905, 1908, 1913	
	Friedrich Loeffler (Note: "Work on the etiology of diphtheria, streptococcus infections, hog cholera, red typhus and hoof and mouth disease")	24 June 1852 Frankfurt an der Oder, Kingdom of Prussia, German Confederation	9 April 1915 Berlin, German Empire	1902, 1909, 1913, 1915	
	Oswald Schmiedeberg (Note: "The founder of the modern pharmacology")	10 October 1838 Talsi, Courland Governorate, Russian Empire	12 July 1921 Baden-Baden, Weimar Germany	1902, 1908, 1909, 1910, 1911, 1912, 1913, 1914, 1915, 1917, 1918, 1920	
	Carl von Hess (Note: "Work on accommodation (of the eye)")	7 March 1863 Mainz, Grand Duchy of Hesse, German Confederation	28 June 1923 Pöcking, Weimar Germany	1902, 1919, 1921, 1923	
	Oscar Hertwig (Note: "Embryological studies as a means of following human and vertebrate development. Theories on cellular polarity, gastrulation, germination, biogenesis and "mechanics of development", and work on heredity")	21 April 1849 Friedberg, Grand Duchy of Hesse, German Confederation	25 October 1922 Berlin, Weimar Germany	1902, 1904, 1906, 1909, 1910, 1911, 1912, 1913, 1914, 1920, 1922	
	Ernest Overton (Note: "Work on osmosis in plant and animal cells, and on anesthesia")	25 February 1865 Stretton, Cheshire, England	27 January 1933 Lund, Sweden	1902, 1903, 1905, 1906, 1912, 1914, 1923	
	Felix Jacob Marchand (Note: "Work on physiological chemistry")	22 October 1846 Halle (Saale), Kingdom of Prussia, German Confederation	4 February 1928 Leipzig, Weimar Germany	1902, 1903, 1911, 1912, 1913, 1918, 1921, 1922, 1923	
	Max Rubner (Note: "Work on metabolism, especially recent work on metabolism in children")	2 June 1854 Munich, Kingdom of Bavaria, German Confederation	27 April 1932 Berlin, Weimar Germany	1902, 1903, 1904, 1909, 1910, 1911, 1912, 1913, 1914, 1916, 1917, 1919, 1920, 1921, 1923, 1924, 1925, 1926, 1928, 1930	
	Georges-Fernand Widal (Note: "Method for diagnosis of typhus")	9 March 1862 Dellys, French Algeria	14 January 1929 Paris, France	1902, 1905, 1918, 1920, 1921, 1922, 1923, 1924, 1925, 1926, 1927, 1928, 1929	
	Ferdinand Hueppe (Note: "Discovery of carbon dioxide assimilation in bacteria; disproved Virchow´s "Entität der kranken Zelle" and Pasteur/Koch´s "Entität der pathogenen Mikrobien"; introduced better hygienic methods against infectious disease")	24 August 1852 Neuwied, Kingdom of Prussia, German Confederation	15 September 1938 Dresden, Nazi Germany	1902, 1930	
	Richard Pfeiffer (Note: "Founder of the field of serum diagnostics")	27 March 1858 Zduny, Kingdom of Prussia, German Confederation	15 September 1945 Bad Landeck, Niederschlesien, now Poland	1902, 1908, 1909, 1910, 1911, 1912, 1913, 1914, 1915, 1916, 1919, 1923, 1924, 1926, 1927, 1930, 1931	
	Joseph von Mering	28 February 1849 Cologne, Kingdom of Prussia, German Confederation	5 January 1908 Halle (Saale), German Empire	1902, 1903, 1906	Nominated jointly with O.Minkowski only (Note: "Work on the relation between pancreas and glucosuria")
	Oskar Minkowski (Note: "Work on diabetes mellitus and the effects of extirpation of the pancreas")	13 January 1858 Aleksotas, Russian Empire	18 June 1931 Mecklenburg-Strelitz, Weimar Germany	1902, 1903, 1906, 1912, 1914, 1924, 1925, 1927, 1928, 1929, 1932	
	Max von Gruber (Note: "Discovery of specific agglutination of cells through blood serum")	6 July 1853 Vienna, Austrian Empire	16 September 1927 Berchtesgaden, Weimar Germany	1902, 1903, 1907, 1910	
1903
	Herbert Durham	30 March 1866 London, England	25 October 1945 Cambridge, England	1903	Nominated jointly (Note: "for their conjoint discovery of the agglutinating effect of 'immunune' sera upon the kinds of bacteria employed in producung the immunity") with M.von Gruber by R.Ross the only time
	Eugène Koeberlé (Note: "The first surgeon who adapted Pasteur´s teachings, and already in the 1860´s (before Lister) tried to create an aseptic surgical environment by disinfecting surfaces, washing hands, boiling instruments and using dry towels to wipe up blood")	4 January 1828 Sélestat, France	13 June 1915 Strasbourg, Alsace, German Empire	1903	Nominated by P.Zweifel the only time
	Magnus Blix	25 December 1849 Säbrå, Sweden	14 February 1904 Lund, Sweden	1903	Nominated jointly (Note: "Work on psychology and psychiatry, especially studies of mental energy.") by G.P.Al.von Bunge the only time
	Alfred Goldscheider	4 August 1858 Sommerfeld, Kingdom of Prussia, German Confederation	10 April 1935 Berlin, Nazi Germany	1903	Nominated jointly by G.P.Al.von Bunge the only time
	Gustav Wilhelm Wolff (Note: "Work on the regeneration of part of the eye ("Die Regeneration der Urodelenlinze", Archiv für Entwicklungsmechanik)")	14 November 1834 Hamburg, German Confederation	17 April 1913 London, England	1903	Nominated by J.Kollmann the only time
	Peter Dettweiler (Note: "The contemporary scientist who has done most for combatting tuberculosis, and whose methods of treatment are used in today´s sanitoriums")	4 August 1837 Wintersheim, Grand Duchy of Hesse, German Confederation	12 January 1904 Kronberg im Taunus, German Empire	1903	Nominated by H.Curschmann the only time
	Andrés Martínez Vargas (Note: "for his own work to improve hygiene in maternity wards in his country and on sickness in infants")	27 October 1861 Barbastro, Spain	26 July 1948 Barcelona, Spain	1903	Self-nominations
	Zaharia (U.) Samfirescu (Note: "for six own works on osteoplastic surgery")	?	8 April 1905 Iași, Romania	1903	Self-nominations
	Ludwig Wille (Note: "for own work on the relationship between prophylaxis and therapy in treatment of disease")	30 March 1834 Buchdorf, Kingdom of Bavaria, German Confederation	6 December 1912 Basel, Switzerland	1903	Self-nominations
	Karl Weigert (Note: "work on the nervous system")	19 March 1845 Münsterberg, Kingdom of Prussia, German Confederation	5 August 1904 Frankfurt, German Empire	1903	Nominated by L.Laqueur only
	Theodor Leber (Note: "work on chemotaxis and inflammation")	29 February 1840 Karlsruhe, Grand Duchy of Baden, German Confederation	7 April 1917 Heidelberg, German Empire	1903, 1908	Nominated by L.Laqueur only
	Étienne-Jules Marey (Note: "Development of graphic and chronophotographic methods to study, for example, respiration, pulse rate, motion of human cells and muscle reactions")	5 March 1830 Beaune, France	15 May 1904 Paris, France	1903, 1904	
	Walter Reed (Note: "Work on yellow fever in Cuba, leading to proof of the role played by mosquitos in transmission of the disease")	13 September 1851 Belroi, Virginia, United States	22 November 1902 Washington, D.C., United States	1903, 1905, 1906	First North American nominated (posthumously) for the Nobel Prize in Physiology or Medicine
	Louis Willems (Note: "Discovery of preventive inoculation of livestock against peripneumonia")	25 April 1822 Hasselt, Belgium	21 January 1907 Hasselt, Belgium	1903, 1907	Nominated by Ern.Masoin only
	James Carrol (Note: "Work on the conveyance of Yellow Fever")	5 June 1854 Woolwich, London, England	16 September 1907 Washington, D.C., United States	1903, 1905, 1906, 1907, 1908	
	Gerhard Armauer Hansen (Note: "The discovery of the leprosy bacillus, and methods of prevention")	29 July 1841 Bergen, Norway	12 February 1912 Florø, Norway	1903, 1908, 1911	
	Max Verworn (Note: "Studies of the physiology of the cell")	4 November 1863 Berlin, Kingdom of Prussia, German Confederation	23 November 1921 Bonn, Weimar Germany	1903, 1906, 1913, 1914, 1915,	
	Auguste Chauveau (Note: "Work in experimental pathology, physiology (electrophysiology and mechanics of the circulatory system) and metabolism")	21 November 1827 Villeneuve-la-Guyard, France	4 January 1917 Paris, France	1903, 1904, 1905, 1908, 1909, 1910, 1911, 1912, 1913, 1914, 1916	
	Aristides Agramonte (Note: "Work on yellow fever and the role of mosquitos in the transmission of the disease")	3 June 1868 Camaguey, Cuba, Spanish West Indies	19 August 1931 New Orleans, Louisiana, United States	1903, 1905, 1912, 1913, 1914, 1915, 1917	
	Ernst Alexander Homén (Note: "Work on the pathobacteriology of the nervous system. Two books are mentioned as a summary of Homéns work (1. "Die Wirkung einiger Bakterien und ihrer Toxine auf verschisdens Organe des Körpers, mit 13 Tafeln", Acta Sociatatis Scientiarum Fennicae, Tom.XXX.1902. 2. "Die Wirkung der Streptokokken und ihrer Toxine auf verschisdens Organe des Körpers, mit 10 Tafeln", Beiträge zur pathol-Anatomie und zur allg. Pathologie, Bd. XXV H.l. 1899)")	14 September 1851 Pieksämäki, Grand Duchy of Finland, Russian Empire	12 December 1926 Helsinki, Finland	1903, 1919	
1904
	Charles Richet (Note: "For their work on serum therapy")	26 August 1850 Paris, France	4 December 1935 Paris, France	1904, 1907, 1911, 1912, 1913, 1914, 1929	Won the 1913 Nobel Prize in Physiology or Medicine (Note: "in recognition of his work on anaphylaxis") and nominated for the Nobel Peace Prize (Note: "as an executive member of both the Permanent International Peace Bureau and the Inter-Parliamentary Union") too.
	Jules Héricourt	1850 France	1938 France	1904	Nominated jointly (Note: "For their work on serum therapy") with Ch.R.Richet by Louis Moreau the only time
	István Apáthy (Note: "Microscopic and other studies of the central nervous system as described in his major work published 1897 ("Das leitande Element des Nervensystems und seine topographischen Beziehungen zu den Zellen") and updated 1898, 1900, 1901, 1902 and 1903")	4 January 1863 Pest, Kingdom of Hungary	27 September 1922 Szeged, Hungary	1903, 1904, 1909	
	William Williams Keen (Note: "Author of many scientific books and papers on surgery; a distinguished anatomist and eminent scientist")	19 January 1837 Philadelphia, Pennsylvania, United States	7 June 1932 Philadelphia, Pennsylvania, United States	1904	Nominated by Edward Parker Davis (1856–1937) the only time
	Ernst von Bergmann (Note: "Introduction of aseptic methods, and for his book on surgery "über Chirurgie bei Gehirnkrankheiter"")	16 December 1836 Riga, Governorate of Livonia, Russian Empire	25 March 1907 Wiesbaden, German Empire	1904	Nominated by V.Czerny the only time
	Paulet Chauveau (probably Vincent Paulet)	9 November 1828 Montpellier, France	14 April 1906 Montpellier, France	1904	
	Pierre Marie Augustin Charpentier (Note: "Discovery that the human body emits "Blondlot" radiation" ("...pour ses researches sur l´emission de rayons Blondlet pur l´organism humain"))	15 June 1852 France	4 August 1916 France	1904	
	Hector Cristiani (Note: "Work on the thyroid and adrenal glands")	15 December 1862 Trieste, Austrian Empire	30 October 1940 Geneva, Switzerland	1904, 1909	Nominated by A.Ch.Fr.Eternod only
	Ernst Schulze (Note: "protein structure in plants")	31 July 1840 Bovenden, Kingdom of Hannover, German Confederation	15 June 1912 Zurich, Switzerland	1904	Nominated by Adam Josef Kunkel (27.11.1848 Lohr am Main – 20.8.1905 Ammerland am Starnberger See) from Würzburg the only time
	Onofrio Abbate (Note: "essay on the negative effects of eunichism in the Orient")	29 February 1824 Palermo, Kingdom of the Two Sicilies	11 October 1915 Cairo, Sultanate of Egypt	1904	Self-nomination
	César Roux (Note: "Roux is one of Europe´s greatest surgeons, the inventor of new surgical methods, especially in the gastro-intestinal tract, a skilful diagnostician, successful surgeon and eminent teacher")	23 March 1857 Mont-la-Ville, Switzerland	21 December 1934 Lausanne, Switzerland	1904, 1905	
	Eduard Hitzig (Note: "Innovative new research on the brain")	6 February 1838 Berlin, Kingdom of Prussia, German Confederation	20 August 1907 Sankt Blasien, German Empire	1904, 1905, 1906	
	William Gowers (Note: ""Manual of Diseases of the Nervous System", 3:rd ed, 1899, and "Manual and Atlas of Medical Ophthalmology", 3:rd ed, 1892. Work on Leucocythaemia and Hodgkin´s Diesease")	20 March 1845 London, England	4 May 1915 London, England	1904, 1905, 1912	
	Angelo Celli (Note: "investigated the life cycle of the malaria parasites and developed prophylactics")	25 March 1857 Cagli, Papal States	2 November 1914 Monza, Kingdom of Italy	1903, 1904, 1907, 1912, 1913,	
	Hugo Sellheim (Note: "Work in the fields of obstetrics and gynecology")	28 December 1871 Biblis, German Empire	22 April 1936 Leipzig, Nazi Germany	1904, 1927	
	David Bruce (Note: "Work on Nagana, sleeping-sickness and Malta Fever")	29 May 1855 Melbourne, Australia	27 November 1931 London, England	1904, 1907, 1908, 1909, 1911, 1912, 1913, 1914, 1915, 1917, 1918, 1919, 1921, 1922, 1925, 1926, 1929, 1930, 1931, 1932	
	Adolf Lorenz (Note: "Work on reposition of congenital hip-joint luxation")	21 April 1854 Weidenau, Austrian Empire	12 February 1946 Sankt Andrä-Wördern, Austria	1904, 1913, 1924, 1925, 1926, 1932, 1933	
	Karl Koller (Note: "his discovery of the local anesthetic power of cocaine, and his generous presentation of it to the profession without pecuniary return")	3 December 1857 Schüttenhofen, Austrian Empire	21 March 1944 New York, United States	1904, 1908, 1913, 1931, 1937	
1905
	Ernst Abbe (Note: "Work on the perfection of the microscope and work on social hygiene")	23 January 1840 Eisenach, Saxe-Weimar-Eisenach, German Confederation	14 January 1905 Jena, German Empire	1905, 1906	Died before the only chance to be rewarded but nominated earlier for Nobel Prize in Physics too.
	Sergei Tchiriew (Note: "Work on the electrical conditions in animal organs")	20 February 1850 Vitebsk, Vitebsk Governorate, Russian Empire	1915 Kyiv, Kiev Governorate, Russian Empire	1905, 1910,	
	Herman Snellen (Note: "for researches on ophthalmology")	19 February 1834 Zeist, Netherlands	18 January 1908 Utrecht, Netherlands	1905	Nominated by Francesco Falchi (28.2.1848 Chiaramonti – 1946 Sassari) the only time
	Paul Brouardel	13 February 1837 Saint-Quentin, Aisne, France	23 July 1906 Paris, France	1905	Nominated by A.N.Gilbert the only time
	N.Tschistowitsch or F.Tschistowitsch	14 December 1860 Saint Petersburg, Russian Empire	29 March 1926 Leningrad, Russia	1905	Nominated with J.J.B.V.Bordet by G.Hauser the only time
	N.Tschistowitsch or F.Tschistowitsch	1 February 1870 Saint Petersburg, Russian Empire	24 October 1942 Novosibirsk, Russia	1905	Nominated with J.J.B.V.Bordet by G.Hauser the only time
	Émile Charles Achard (Note: "Work on the regulation of fluids in the living organism")	24 July 1860 Paris, France	7 August 1944 Versailles, France	1905, 1906, 1932	
	Cesare Lombroso (Note: "The creator of a new scientific branch, criminal anthropology, which is medical in its methods, principles and histological foundations but social and judicial in its practice")	6 November 1835 Verona, Kingdom of Lombardy–Venetia	19 October 1909 Turin, Kingdom of Italy	1905, 1907, 1908, 1909	
	Giulio Vassale (Note: "Work on glands with endocrine secretion; thyroid and parathyroid glands, the hypophysis and adrenal glands")	22 June 1862 Lerici, Kingdom of Italy	3 January 1913 Modena, Kingdom of Italy	1905, 1906, 1907, 1911	
	Edoardo Bassini (Note: "The radical treatment of hernia")	14 April 1844 Pavia, Kingdom of Lombardy–Venetia	19 July 1924 Padua, Kingdom of Italy	1905, 1913, 1914, 1925	
	Henry Rose Carter (Note: "Further work on yellow fever, especially the discovery that a considerable interval must elapse between the first case of yellow fever and the subsequent outbreak or epidemic of the disease")	25 August 1852 Caroline County, Virginia, United States	14 September 1925 Washington, D.C., United States	1905, 1906, 1907	Nominated jointly with C.Finlay only
	Carlos Finlay (Note: "Work on the transmission of yellow fever")	3 December 1833 Camaguey, Cuba, Spanish West Indies	20 August 1915 Havana, Cuba	1905, 1906, 1907, 1912, 1913, 1914, 1915	
	Franz Hofmeister (Note: "Work on crystallization of proteins and swelling of colloids")	30 August 1850 Prague, Austrian Empire	26 July 1922 Würzburg, Weimar Germany	1903, 1905, 1906, 1909, 1912, 1914, 1919, 1922	
	Jacques-Arsène d'Arsonval (Note: "Investigations which have led to the discovery of a new physical agent, electrical oscillations at high frequency, which have a special effect on the organism and therefore can be used in therapy")	8 June 1851 La Porcherie, France	31 December 1940 Solignac, France	1905, 1910, 1913, 1914, 1916, 1934, 1936	
	Aldo Castellani (Note: "Original work in discovering the relation of the Trypanosome to sleeping sickness")	8 September 1874 Florence, Kingdom of Italy	3 October 1971 Lisbon, Portugal	1905, 1907, 1908, 1909, 1910, 1911, 1912, 1913, 1914, 1920, 1921, 1927, 1928, 1929, 1930, 1931, 1932, 1934, 1935, 1937, 1941, 1953	
1906
	Wilhelm Röntgen (Note: "The work done is in the physical field but among the latest discoveries, Röntgen´s has been of greatest use in medicine")	27 March 1845 Remscheid, Kingdom of Prussia, German Confederation	10 February 1923 Munich, Weimar Germany	1906, 1909, 1910, 1919, 1922	Won the 1902 Nobel Prize in Physics. (Note: "in recognition of the extraordinary services he has rendered by the discovery of the remarkable rays subsequently named after him")
	Gottlieb Burckhardt (Note: "has through pioneer surgery of the brain led the way to the cure of chronical congenital mental illness")	24 December 1836 Basel, Switzerland	6 February 1907 Basel, Switzerland	1906	
	Jesse William Lazear (Note: "Work on yellow fever")	2 May 1866 Baltimore, Maryland, United States	25 September 1900 Havana, Cuba	1906	Nominated posthumously.
	Wilbur Olin Atwater (Note: "Investigations on dietics and metabolism")	3 May 1844 Johnsburg, New York, United States	22 September 1907 Middletown, Connecticut, United States	1906	
	Leopold Freund (Note: "Work on the use of X-rays in the treatment of certain diseases")	5 April 1868 Prague, Austria-Hungary	7 January 1943 Brussels, Belgium	1906	
	John Beard (Note: "The discovery of the existence in lower vertebrates of an independent nervous system which arises and is functional during earlier embryonic stages, the discovery of the true nature of the thymus gland, demonstration of the direct morphological continuity of the germ cells of vertebrate animals")	11 November 1858 Heaton Norris, England	24 November 1924 Lancashire, England	1906	
	Ernst Viktor von Leyden (Note: "Work on internal medicine, introduction of nutritional therapy, work on the introduction and development of consumption sanatoria, and cancer research")	20 April 1832 Danzig, Kingdom of Prussia, German Confederation	5 October 1910 Berlin, German Empire	1906, 1907	
	Fritz Schaudinn (Note: "Observations on the parasites of malaria and the discovery of the spirillum of syphilis")	19 September 1871 Röseningken, German Empire	22 June 1906 Hamburg, German Empire	1906, 1907, 1909	Died before the only chance to be rewarded
	Guido Tizzoni (Note: "Work on the treatment of rabies with radium")	10 January 1853 Pisa, Grand Duchy of Tuscany	4 September 1932 Pisa, Kingdom of Italy	1906, 1910, 1911	
	Victor Hensen (Note: "Researches on the biology of the sea")	10 February 1835 Schleswig, Duchy of Schleswig	5 April 1924 Kiel, Weimar Germany	1906, 1910, 1912	
	Albert Neisser (Note: "Work on lepra (1879–1904), gonorrhea (1879–1904), syphilis (1881–1906), experimental syphilis (1904–1906) and on prostitution and the prevention of venereal diseases (1889–1905), and work on dermathology (1891–1904)")	22 January 1855 Schweidnitz, Kingdom of Prussia, German Confederation	30 July 1916 Breslau, German Empire	1906, 1908, 1910, 1911, 1912, 1913, 1914, 1915, 1916	
	Almroth Wright (Note: "Discoveries as to the coagulability of the blood")	10 August 1861 Middleton Tyas, Yorkshire, England	30 April 1947 Farnham Common, Buckinghamshire, England	1906, 1907, 1910, 1912, 1914, 1915, 1918, 1919, 1925	
	August Bier (Note: "The book "Die hyperämie als heilmittel, published 1903")	24 November 1861 Arolsen, Fürstentum Waldeck-Pyrmont, German Confederation	12 March 1949 Rietz-Neuendorf, Germany	1906, 1907, 1908, 1909, 1910, 1911, 1913, 1914, 1915, 1918, 1919, 1920, 1923, 1924, 1925, 1928, 1931, 1934, 1936	
1907
	Emil Theodor Kocher (Note: "Work on the pathology of the thyroid gland")	25 August 1841 Bern, Switzerland	27 July 1917 Bern, Switzerland	1907, 1909, 1910, 1911	Won the 1909 Nobel Prize in Physiology or Medicine. (Note: "for his work on the physiology, pathology and surgery of the thyroid gland")
	Ernst Leopold Salkowski (Note: "Highly eminent and intelligent researcher")	11 October 1844 Königsberg, Kingdom of Prussia, German Confederation	8 March 1923 Berlin, Weimar Germany	1903, 1907	
	Carl Röse (Note: "Study of the occurrence and cause of caries")	17 April 1864 Clingen, Schwarzburg-Sondershausen, German Confederation	9 March 1947 Gebesee, Germany	1907	
	Anton Dohrn (Note: "Founder of the zoological station in Naples, and for the research conducted there")	29 December 1840 Stettin, Kingdom of Prussia, German Confederation	26 September 1909 Munich, German Empire	1907	
	Otto von Schrön (Note: "Biological importance of crystals (eg uric acid), and work on tuberculosis and phthisis")	7 September 1837 Hof, Kingdom of Bavaria, German Confederation	13 May 1917 Naples, Kingdom of Italy	1907	
	Augustus Desiré Waller (Note: "for work on chloroform; for his fundamental researches on animal and plant electricity and the application of electrical methods to study the physiology of the heart and the diagnosis of heart lesions")	12 July 1856 Paris, France	11 March 1922 London, England	1907, 1922	
	Waldemar Haffkine (Note: "First to implement the method of immunity by injection of dead cultures, in vaccines against cholera and plague")	15 March 1860 Odesa, Russian Empire	26 October 1930 Lausanne, Switzerland	1902, 1907, 1908	
	Christian Bohr (Note: "Work on the chemistry of respiration")	14 February 1855 Copenhagen, Denmark	3 February 1911 Copenhagen, Denmark	1907, 1908	
	Olof Hammarsten (Note: "Work on proteins and enzymes")	21 August 1841 Norrköping, Sweden	21 September 1932 Uppsala, Sweden	1907, 1910, 1911, 1912, 1913	Nominated for Nobel prize in Chemistry too
	Ivan M Dogiel (Note: "Physiological and anatomical studies of the organs of sight and hearing, as well as the heart and blood circulation")	19 March 1830 Zales'e, Vitebsk Governorate, Russian Empire	29 August 1916 Kazan, Russian Empire	1907, 1914	
	Wilhelm Wundt (Note: "Development of psychological-medical methods of study")	16 August 1832 Mannheim, Grand Duchy of Baden, German Confederation	31 August 1920 Großbothen, Leipzig, Weimar Germany	1907, 1909, 1912, 1916	
	Vincenz Czerny (Note: "Representative award for the importance of research on the treatment of cancer")	19 November 1842 Trautenau, Austrian Empire	3 October 1916 Heidelberg, German Empire	1907, 1913, 1917	
	Hugo de Vries (Note: "Observation of transmutation and work on heredity")	16 February 1848 Haarlem, Netherlands	21 May 1935 Lunteren, Netherlands	1907, 1930	
	Camille Delezenne (Note: "Work on blood coagulation, the secretion and activation of pancreatic juice")	10 June 1868 Genech, France	7 July 1932 Paris, France	1907, 1920, 1922, 1923, 1925, 1926, 1931	
	Albert Calmette (Note: "Preventative vaccination against tuberculosis; sera against snake venom; work on bubonic plague")	12 July 1863 Nice, France	29 October 1933 Paris, France	1907, 1908, 1911, 1919, 1920, 1921, 1922, 1923, 1925, 1926, 1927, 1928, 1929, 1930, 1931, 1932, 1933, 1934	
	Erich Hoffmann (Note: "Work on the etiology of syphilis")	25 April 1868 Witzmitz, Kingdom of Prussia, German Confederation	8 May 1959 Bonn, Germany	1907, 1910, 1936	
	Leonard Rogers (Note: "Work on Kala-azar, methods of inoculation against Rinderpest (cattle plague), first experimental proof of the transmission of Surra by the bites of horse flies and investigation of snake venoms")	18 January 1868 Helston, Cornwall, England	16 September 1962 Truro, Cornwall, England	1907, 1917, 1929, 1930, 1931, 1934, 1935, 1940	
1908
	Emil Fischer (Note: "Work on protein chemistry")	9 October 1852 Euskirchen, Kingdom of Prussia, German Confederation	15 July 1919 Berlin, Weimar Germany	1903, 1908, 1909, 1910, 1915, 1919	Won the 1902 Nobel Prize in Chemistry (Note: "in recognition of the extraordinary services he has rendered by his work on sugar and purine syntheses")
	Angelo Mosso (Note: "Extensive work in physiology, especially studies of blood circulation, the bladder, temperature regulation of the brain, use of the plethysmograph and ergograph, and physiology of residents of the Alps")	30 May 1846 Turin, Kingdom of Sardinia	24 November 1910 Turin, Kingdom of Italy	1906, 1908	
	Oskar Langendorff (Note: "Studies of the heart of warm-blooded animals, and methods for prolonging life of the heart after removal from the body")	1 February 1853 Breslau, Kingdom of Prussia, German Confederation	10 May 1908 Rostock, German Empire	1908	Died before the only chance to be rewarded
	Arthur von Hippel (Note: "for his method of corneal transplant, and other advances in eye surgery")	24 October 1841 Fischhausen, Kingdom of Prussia, German Confederation	26 October 1916 Göttingen, German Empire	1908	Nominated by Ad.Vossius the only time
	M.V.Galtier (Note: "Studies of the effects of injection of rabies virus into the circulatory system. Rabies is possibly transmitted through ingestion of contaminated material")	15 October 1846 Langogne, France	24 April 1908 La Mulatière, France	1908	Nominated by M.Bouley from Paris the only time but died before the only chance to be rewarded
	Carlo Ruata (Note: "own work on tuberculosis and his efforts to improve sanitary and hygiene conditions in Europe")	25 June 1849 Montaldo Roero, Kingdom of Sardinia	8 March 1918 Perugia, Kingdom of Italy	1908	Self-nomination on: "Own work on tuberculosis and his efforts to improve sanitary and hygiene conditions in Europe"
	Victor Horsley (Note: "Investigations on the functions of the central nervous system and their practical use in the surgery of the central nervous system")	14 April 1857 Kensington, London, England	16 July 1916 Amarah, Ottoman Iraq	1908, 1909, 1910, 1911, 1913	
	Guido Baccelli (Note: "for introduction of medicaments in the veins")	25 November 1830 Rome, Papal States	10 January 1916 Rome, Kingdom of Italy	1905, 1906, 1908, 1910, 1911, 1912, 1913, 1914,	
	Ewald Hering (Note: "Work on physiological optics")	5 August 1834 Gersdorf, Kingdom of Saxony, German Confederation	26 January 1918 Leipzig, German Empire	1908, 1909, 1911, 1912, 1913, 1914, 1915, 1916, 1917	
	Franz E. C. Neumann (Note: "Work on diseases of the blood, and the discovery of the bone marrow´s function in the formation of blood")	30 January 1834 Königsberg, Kingdom of Prussia, German Confederation	6 March 1918 Königsberg, German Empire	1908, 1909, 1917	
	Carl Ludwig Schleich (Note: "Introduction of local anaesthesia in practice")	19 July 1859 Stettin, Kingdom of Prussia, German Confederation	7 March 1922 Bad Saarow, Weimar Germany	1908, 1913, 1915, 1920	
	Wilhelm Roux (Note: "Work on the mechanics of development")	9 June 1850 Jena, Saxe-Weimar-Eisenach, German Confederation	15 September 1924 Halle (Saale), Weimar Germany	1908, 1909, 1910, 1911, 1913, 1914, 1915, 1916, 1918, 1919, 1920, 1921, 1922, 1923	
	Jacques-Louis Reverdin (Note: "Work on transplantations and the discovery of surgical myxoedema")	28 August 1842 Cologny, Switzerland	9 January 1929 Pregny-Chambésy, Switzerland	1908, 1913, 1920, 1925	
	Theobald Smith (Note: "Contributions to the biochemistry of bacteria; production of immunity by filtered bacterial cultures (hog cholera); work on Texas fever")	31 July 1859 Albany, New York, United States	10 December 1934 New York, United States	1908, 1909, 1910, 1912, 1913, 1914, 1915, 1916, 1917, 1918, 1920, 1921, 1922, 1923, 1925, 1926, 1930, 1931, 1932, 1934	
1909
	Allvar Gullstrand (Note: "Work on optical imaging")	5 June 1862 Landskrona, Sweden	28 July 1930 Stockholm, Sweden	1909, 1911, 1912	Won the 1911 Nobel Prize in Physiology or Medicine (Note: "for his work on the dioptrics of the eye") and nominated for Nobel Prize in Physics too
	David Ferrier (Note: "Research on the localization of cerebral faculties")	13 January 1843 Woodside, Aberdeen, Scotland	19 March 1928 London, England	1909	
	Julius Kollmann	24 February 1834 Holzheim am Forst, Kingdom of Bavaria, German Confederation	24 June 1918 Basel, Switzerland	1909	Nominated jointly by A.Rauber the only time (Note: "Early development of the human race ("... Arbeiten über die vorgeschichtlichen Menschenrassen; dieser durch die in mehrehen Schriften verfochtene Theorie der Abstammung des Menschen von kleinen Menschenrassen." Tartu, Estonia)")
	Gustav Albert Schwalbe	1 August 1844 Quedlinburg, Kingdom of Saxony, German Confederation	23 April 1916 Strasbourg, Alsace, German Empire	1909	Nominated jointly by A.Rauber the only time
	Richard Hertwig	23 September 1850 Friedberg, Grand Duchy of Hesse, German Confederation	3 October 1937 Schlederloh, Bavaria, Nazi Germany	1909	Nominated jointly (Note: "Work on the fertilization process and embryology") with O.Hertwig by A.Rauber the only time
	Theodor Boveri (Note: "Work on the chemistry of fertilization")	12 October 1862 Bamberg, Kingdom of Bavaria, German Confederation	15 October 1915 Würzburg, German Empire	1909	Nominated jointly (Note: "Work on cytology") with J.Loeb by A.Rauber the only time
	August Weismann	17 January 1834 Free City of Frankfurt, German Confederation	5 November 1914 Freiburg im Breisgau, German Empire	1909	Nominated jointly with J.Loeb by A.Rauber the only time
	John Collins Warren Jr. (Note: "Has done more for the advancement of surgery and medical teaching than any man in America")	4 May 1842 Boston, Massachusetts, United States	3 November 1927	1909	Nominated by R.Park the only time
	Antonin Poncet (Note: "Work on tuberculosis and tuberculous rheumatism")	28 March 1849 Saint-Trivier-sur-Moignans, France	16 September 1913 Culoz, France	1909	Nominated by Emile Laget the only time
	Karl von Bardeleben (Note: "for contributions to the anatomical, medical and surgical sciences")	7 March 1849 Giessen, Grand Duchy of Hesse, German Confederation	19 December 1919 Jena, Weimar Germany	1909	Nominated with Hector Cristiani by A.Ch.Fr.Eternod the only time
	Demosthenes	?	?	1909	Self-nomination
	Luigi Luciani (Note: "Work on the functions of the brain")	23 November 1842 Ascoli Piceno, Papal States	23 June 1919 Rome, Kingdom of Italy	1909, 1913, 1914, 1916, 1918, 1919	
	William C. Gorgas (Note: "The demonstration that yellow fever and malaria could be banished from the Isthmus of Panama")	3 October 1854 Toulminville, Alabama, United States	3 July 1920 London, England	1909, 1914, 1915, 1916, 1918, 1919	
	Heinrich Quincke (Note: "Work on lumbar puncture")	26 August 1842 Frankfurt an der Oder, Kingdom of Prussia, German Confederation	19 May 1922 Frankfurt am Main, Weimar Germany	1909, 1910, 1911, 1912, 1913, 1914, 1918, 1919, 1920, 1922	
	Carl Flügge (Note: "Work on the transmission of tuberculosis")	12 September 1847 Hanover, Kingdom of Hanover, German Confederation	10 December 1923 Berlin, Weimar Germany	1909, 1911, 1914, 1919, 1920, 1922	
	Emil Kraepelin (Note: "Kraepelin has reformed the areas of scientific and practical psychiatry")	15 February 1856 Neustrelitz, Grand Duchy of Mecklenburg-Strelitz, German Confederation	7 October 1926 Munich, Weimar Germany	1909, 1911, 1917, 1918, 1923, 1925, 1926	
