= Camerer =

Camerer may mean:

- Rudolf Jakob Camerarius, (1665-1721), German botanist and physician (latinization of "Camerer")
- Colin Camerer (b. 1959), US economist
- Sheila Camerer, South African politician
- Wilhelm Camerer, (1842-1910), German pediatrician
