= List of nominees for the Nobel Prize in Physiology or Medicine (1940–1949) =

The following is a list of people first nominated for the Nobel Prize in Physiology or Medicine between 1940 and 1949 by year of first nomination.

The Nobel Prize in Physiology or Medicine (Swedish: Nobelpriset i fysiologi eller medicin) is awarded annually by the Nobel Assembly at the Karolinska Institute to scientists who have made outstanding contributions in physiology or medicine. It is one of the five Nobel Prizes which were established by the will of Alfred Nobel in 1895.

Every year, the Nobel Committee for Physiology or Medicine sends out forms, which amount to a personal and exclusive invitation, to about three thousand selected individuals to invite them to submit nominations. The names of the nominees are never publicly announced, and neither are they told that they have been considered for the Prize. Nomination records are strictly sealed for fifty years. However, the nominations for the years 1901 to 1953 are publicly available. Despite the annual sending of invitations, the prize was not awarded in nine years (1915–1918, 1921, 1925, 1940–1942) and has been delayed for a year five times (1919, 1922, 1926, 1938, 1943).

From 1901 to 1953, 935 scientists were nominated for the prize, 63 of which were awarded either jointly or individually. 19 more scientists from these nominees were awarded after 1953. Of the 13 women nominees, only G.Th.Cori was awarded the prize. Besides some scientists from these nominees won the prizes in other fields (including years after 1953): J.Boyd Orr - Peace Prize (1949); L.C.Pauling twice - in Chemistry (1954) and Peace Prize (1962); 3 - in Physics and 20 - in Chemistry (including Fr.Sanger twice - in 1958 and 1980).

In addition, nominations of 65 scientists (including one woman) were declared invalid by the Nobel Committee.

== See also ==
- List of nominees for the Nobel Prize in Physiology or Medicine (1901–1909)
- List of nominees for the Nobel Prize in Physiology or Medicine (1910–1919)
- List of nominees for the Nobel Prize in Physiology or Medicine (1920–1929)
- List of nominees for the Nobel Prize in Physiology or Medicine (1930–1939)
- List of nominees for the Nobel Prize in Physiology or Medicine (1950–1959)

== 1940–1949 ==
| Picture | Name | Born | Died | Years nominated | Notes |
|---|---|---|---|---|---|
1940
| | Arne Wilhelm Kaurin Tiselius (Note: "Development of the method of electrophoresis, and advances in the study of proteins") | August 10, 1902 Stockholm, Sweden | October 29, 1971 Uppsala, Sweden | 1940, 1946, 1948, 1949 | Won the 1948 Nobel Prize in Chemistry (Note: “for his research on electrophoresis and adsorption analysis, especially for his discoveries concerning the complex nature of the serum proteins”) |
| | Noël Armand Fiessinger (Note: "Studies on the physiopathology of the liver") | December 24, 1881 Thaon-les-Vosges, France | January 15, 1946 Paris, France | 1940 | Nominated by Edmond Benhamou (30.3.1882 Algiers - 14.11.1973 Paris) the only time |
| | George Van Siclen Smith | September 17, 1900 New York, United States | 1984 | 1940 | Nominated jointly (Note: "Investigation of a possible hormonal cause of toxemia of pregnancy") by Frank Arthur Pemberton the only time |
| | Olive Watkins Smith | April 29, 1901 Worcester, Massachusetts, United States | 1983 | 1940 | Nominated jointly by Frank Arthur Pemberton the only time |
| | Willis Cohoon Campbell (Note: "New advances in joint surgery") | 1880 Jackson, Mississippi, United States | 1941 Memphis, Tennessee, United States | 1940 | Nominated by William Thomas Pride (b. 28.10.1881 Huntsville - ?) the only time |
| | Paul Gyorgy (Note: "Work on vitamins, especially vitamins B2 and B6") | April 7, 1893 Nagyvárad, Austria-Hungary | March 1, 1976 Morristown, New Jersey, United States | 1940 | Nominated by G.Popovici the only time |
| | Robley Cook Williams (Note: "Isolation and study of vitamin B1") | October 13, 1908 Santa Rosa, California, United States | January 3, 1995 Oneonta, New York, United States | 1940 | Nominated for the Nobel Prize in Chemistry too |
| | Hans Zinsser (Note: "Development of methods for large-scale production of a vaccine against typhus") | November 17, 1878 New York, United States | September 4, 1940 New York, United States | 1940, 1941 | Died before the only chance to be rewarded |
| | Josef Klarer (Note: "for preparation of sulphonamide compounds, and their introduction in therapy") | January 10, 1898 Munich, German Empire | June 21, 1953 Wuppertal-Elberfeld, Germany | 1940 | Nominated by professor Agostino Crosti (1896-1988) from the University of Perugia the only time |
| | Maurizio Ascoli (Note: "for treatment of malaria and tumours of the spleen by intravenous injection of adrenalin") | July 14, 1876 Trieste, Austria-Hungary | August 4, 1958 Palermo, Italy | 1940 | Nominated by V.Ang.Borrino the only time |
| | Hans Berger (Note: "Development of the electroencephalograph") | May 21, 1873 Neuses, Saxe-Coburg and Gotha, German Empire | June 1, 1941 Jena, Nazi Germany | 1940, 1942, 1947, 1950 | |
| | Jan Boeke (Note: "Work on the micro-anatomy of the sympathetic nervous system, especially the discoveries of the fundamental plexus and the periterminal network") | October 23, 1874 Hengelo, Netherlands | September 12, 1956 Bandung, Indonesia | 1940, 1945, 1951 | |
1941
| | Carl Peter Henrik Dam (Note: "The discovery of vitamin K") | February 21, 1895 Copenhagen, Denmark | April 17, 1976 Copenhagen, Denmark | 1941, 1942, 1943, 1944 | Shared the 1943 Nobel Prize in Physiology or Medicine with Edw.Ad.Doisy a year later (Note: “for his discovery of vitamin K”) |
| | Herman James Almquist | March 3, 1903 Helena, Montana, United States | January 15, 1994 | 1941 | Nominated jointly (Note: "Studies on vitamin K") with Edw.Ad.Doisy and L.Fr.Fieser by J.P.Strömbeck the only time |
| | Louis Frederick Fieser | April 7, 1899 Columbus, Ohio, United States | July 25, 1977 Belmont, Massachusetts, United States | 1941 | Nominated for the Nobel Prize in Chemistry too |
| | René Albert Gutmann (Note: "Work on stomach cancer") | December 25, 1885 Paris, France | December 22, 1981 | 1941 | Nominated by Luis Carlos Cadavid the only time |
| | Theophilus Shickel Painter (Note: "Studies of chromosomes, especially in the salivary glands of insects, notably in Drosophila") | August 22, 1889 | October 5, 1969 | 1941 | Nominated by H.J.Chr. de Winiwarter the only time |
| | Jesse Louis Bollman | February 19, 1896 Springfield, Illinois, United States | February 9, 1979 Olmsted County, Minnesota, United States | 1941 | Nominated jointly (Note: "Work on the role of the liver in carbohydrate and protein metabolism") with Fr.Ch.Mann by Albert Compton Broders (8.8.1885 Fairfax – 26.3.1964 Temple) the only time |
| | Thomas Byrd Magath | January 28, 1895 Oxford, Georgia, United States | January 30, 1981 Rochester, Minnesota, United States | 1941 | Nominated jointly with Fr.Ch.Mann by Albert Compton Broders (8.8.1885 Fairfax – 26.3.1964 Temple) the only time |
| | Alberto Leonardo Barton Thompson (Note: "for the discovery of b. Bertonella") | August 12, 1870 Buenos Aires, Argentina | October 25, 1950 Lima, Peru | 1941 | Nominated by C.Enr.Paz Soldán the only time |
| | Hilding Berglund | June 2, 1887 Karlskrona, Sweden | May 12, 1962 Engelbrekt Parish, Sweden | 1941 | Nominated jointly (Note: "Preparation of crystalline secretin, and its use in diagnosis of pancreatic function") with E.Hammarsten by B.P.Babkin the only time |
| | Gunnar Ågren | February 1, 1907 Nacka, Sweden | November 15, 1982 Uppsala, Sweden | 1941 | Nominated jointly with E.Hammarsten by B.P.Babkin the only time |
| | Irvine Heinly Page (Note: "Studies on experimental arterial hypertension; Isolation of renin and angiotonin") | January 7, 1901 Indianapolis, United States | June 10, 1991 Hyannis Port, Massachusetts, United States | 1941, 1942, 1945 | Nominated with H.Goldblatt only |
| | Niels Christian Klendshoj | February 1, 1902 Denmark | ? | 1941 | Nominated jointly (Note: "Work concerning blood typing, and additives to create a truly universal blood for transfusions") with E.Witebsky by Frederick James Parmenter (24.11.1880 Buffalo - 1962) the only time |
| | Ernst Witebsky (Note: "1. Fundamental work on biological specificity such as organ specificity and cancer specificity. 2. Fundamental work on the immunology of the blood groups and the Rh factors and his discovery of the nature of the O and B substances. 3. Studies on the serodiagnosis of infectious diaseses especially syphilis, gonorrhoea, tuberculosis and trichinosis") | September 3, 1901 Frankfurt am Main, German Empire | December 7, 1969 | 1941, 1950 | |
| | Arthur Stoll (Note: "Chemical composition of heart glycosides, especially scillarens, digitalins and strophanthidins") | January 8, 1887 Schinznach-Dorf, Switzerland | January 13, 1971 Dornach, Switzerland | 1941, 1952, 1953 | Nominated for the Nobel Prize in Chemistry too |
| | Einar Hammarsten | January 4, 1889 Norrköping, Sweden | February 16, 1968 Solna, Sweden | 1941, 1955 | |
1942
| | Ernst August Friedrich Ruska (Note: "Development of the method of electrophoresis, and advances in the study of proteins") | December 25, 1906 Heidelberg, German Empire | May 27, 1988 West Berlin, Germany | 1942 (Note: "Development of the electron microscope") | Shared the 1986 Nobel Prize in Physics (Note: “for his fundamental work in electron optics, and for the design of the first electron microscope”) with G.Binnig and H.Rohrer |
| | Bodo von Borries | May 22, 1905 Herford, German Empire | July 17, 1956 Aachen, Germany | 1942 | Nominated for the Nobel Prize in Physics too |
| | Frederic Andrews Gibbs | February 9, 1903 Baltimore, United States | October 18, 1992 Deerfield, Illinois, United States | 1942 | Nominated jointly (Note: "Work on electroencephalography") by L.Benedek the only time |
| | William Gordon Lennox | July 18, 1884 Colorado Springs, United States | July 21, 1960 Middlesex County, Massachusetts, United States | 1942 | Nominated jointly by L.Benedek the only time |
| | Georges de Morsier (Note: "Studies of the physiology and anatomy of the brain. Treatment of diseases of the brain") | February 25, 1894 Paris, France | January 9, 1982 Geneva, Switzerland | 1942 | Nominated by Charles Ladame (19.06.1871, Le Locle - 28.10.1949) the only time |
| | Raoul de Seigneux (Note: "Practical teaching aids, especially for obstetrics and gynecology") | October 27, 1865 Morges, Switzerland | March 25, 1947 | 1942 | Nominated by Charles Ladame (19.06.1871, Le Locle - 28.10.1949) the only time |
| | Rudolph Schoenheimer (Note: "Isotope techniques to study intermediary metabolism") | May 10, 1898 Berlin, German Empire | September 11, 1941 Yonkers, New York, United States | 1942 | Nominated posthumously and for the Nobel Prize in Chemistry too |
| | John Augustine English Eyster (Note: "Study of electrical potentials in cardiac muscle") | July 31, 1881 Augusta County, Virginia, United States | March 5, 1960 Fort Myers, Florida, United States | 1942 | Nominated with J.Erlanger and H.Sp.Gasser only |
| | Eliot Round Clark (Note: "for in situ studies of tissues in live mammals") | November 13, 1881 Shelburne, Massachusetts, United States | 1963 | 1942 | Nominated by Cl.L.P.Masson the only time |
| | Richard Benedict Goldschmidt (Note: "for the elucidation of the nature of sex; bridging the sciences of physiology and genetics") | April 12, 1878 Frankfurt am Main, German Empire | April 24, 1958 Berkeley, California, United States | 1942 | Nominated by R.Cr.Punnett the only time |
| | Colin Leslie Hewett | August 19, 1909 London, England | December 22, 1976 Glasgow, Scotland | 1942 | Nominated jointly (Note: "for the discovery of carcinogenic hydrocarbons") with W.V.Mayneord by S.Bayne-Jones the only time |
| | William Joseph Elford | January 4, 1900 Malmesbury, England | February 14, 1952 | 1942 | Nominated jointly (Note: "for methods for determining the size of virus particles") with Ern.W.Goodpasture by Níels P. Dungal (14.6.1897 Ísafjörður - 29.10.1965 Reykjavík) the only time |
1943
| | Vincent du Vigneaud (Note: "Demonstrated the process of transmethylation as carried out in the animal body. Studies of the structure of the biotin molecule") | May 18, 1901 Chicago, United States | December 11, 1978 White Plains, New York, United States | 1943, 1948, 1949, 1950, 1951, 1954, 1955, 1956 | Won the 1955 Nobel Prize in Chemistry (Note: “for his work on biochemically important sulphur compounds, especially for the first synthesis of a polypeptide hormone”) |
| | Stephen Walter Ranson (Note: "Studies of the central nervous system, especially the relation of the diencephalon to the posterior pituitary and the sympathetic system") | August 28, 1880 Dodge Center, Minnesota, United States | August 30, 1942 | 1943 | Nominated posthumously the only time with J.Barcroft and H.Goldblatt by W.Br.Cannon |
| | Lionel Ernest Howard Whitby (Note: "Work on new active sulphonamide compounds, especially on the activity of Sulphapyridine against pneumococcus. Studies of the mode of action of these drugs") | May 8, 1895 Yeovil, England | November 24, 1956 London, England | 1943 | Nominated by Robert Hughes Parry (3.1.1895 - 1.5.1986) the only time |
| | Samuel Ottmar Mast (Note: "Discovery of an animal which synthesizes protoplasma from mineral matter without the use of chlorophyll or light") | October 5, 1871 Washtenaw County, Michigan, United States | February 3, 1947 | 1943 | Nominated by Eduard Carl Adolf Uhlenhuth (19.7.1885 Wolkersdorf, Austria - 5.5.1961) the only time |
| | Harvey Ellsworth Billig Jr. | June 16, 1907 Grand Junction, Colorado, United States | ? | 1943 | Nominated jointly (Note: "Studies of nerve-muscle function; reinnervation of muscle") by Harlan Shoemaker the only time |
| | Anthonie H. van Harreveld | February 16, 1904 Haarlem, Netherlands | August 14, 1987 | 1943 | Nominated jointly by Harlan Shoemaker the only time |
| | Cornelis Adrianus Gerrit Wiersma | October 10, 1905 Naaldwijk, Netherlands | May 18 (or 19), 1979 Pasadena, United States | 1943 | Nominated jointly by Harlan Shoemaker the only time |
| | Giuseppe Pagano (Note: "Function of nucleus caudatus, work on vasosensibility, and localization in the brain") | September 21, 1872 Palermo, Kingdom of Italy | August 9, 1959 Palermo, Italy | 1943, 1944 | |
| | Ladislas Joseph Meduna (Note: "Cardiazol-induced shock treatment of schizophrenia") | March 27, 1896 Budapest, Austria-Hungary | October 31, 1964 Chicago, United States | 1943, 1950, 1952, 1953 | Nominated with M.J.Sakel only |
| | Ugo Cerletti (Note: "Electroshock treatment of schizophrenia") | September 26, 1877 Conegliano, Kingdom of Italy | July 25, 1963 Rome, Italy | 1943, 1947, 1948, 1949, 1950, 1951, 1952, 1953, 1955 | |
| | Alexander Fleming (Note: "Discovery and development of the new chemotherapeutic agent "penicillin"") | August 6, 1881 Lochfield farm near Darvel, Scotland | March 11, 1955 London, England | 1943, 1944, 1945, 1946, 1952 | Shared the 1945 Nobel Prize in Physiology or Medicine (Note: “for the discovery of penicillin and its curative effect in various infectious diseases”) |
| | Baron Howard Walter Florey | September 24, 1898 Adelaide, Australia | February 21, 1968 London, England | 1943, 1944, 1945, 1946 | Shared the 1945 Nobel Prize in Physiology or Medicine |
| 1944 | | | | | Shared the 1945 Nobel Prize in Physiology or Medicine |
| | E.B.Chain (Note: “Discovery of penicillin (Fleming) and its curative effect in various infectious diseases (Chain and Florey)”) | June 19, 1906 Berlin, German Empire | August 12, 1979 Castlebar, Ireland | 1944, 1945 | Shared the 1945 Nobel Prize in Physiology or Medicine |
| | Arthur Lawrie Tatum (Note: "Discovery of arsenoxide (mapharsen); use of mapharsen in treatment of syphilis") | May 17, 1884 Wall Lake, Iowa, United States | November 11, 1955 Madison, Wisconsin, United States | 1944 | Nominated by George Byron Roth (22.5.1879 Mount Eaton – ?) the only time |
| | Hermann Mooser (Note: "Work on the pathology and etiology of Mexican typhus (murine typhus)") | May 3, 1891 Maienfeld, Switzerland | June 20, 1971 Zürich, Switzerland | 1944 | Nominated by H.Schinz the only time |
| | Torald Herman Sollman | February 10, 1874 Kolberg, German Empire | February 11, 1965 | 1944 | Nominated jointly (Note: "for "The relation of the absorption, fate and excretion of bismuth preparations to their therapeutic effectiveness"") by professor of pharmacology Clinton H. Thienes (9.8.1896 Evansville - 18.5.1976) from Los Angeles the only time |
| | Paul John Hanzlik | July 24, 1885 near Shueyville, Iowa, United States | February 1, 1951 San Mateo, California, United States | 1944 | Nominated jointly by professor of pharmacology Clinton H. Thienes (9.8.1896 Evansville - 18.5.1976) from Los Angeles the only time |
| | Ichiji Tasaki | October 10, 1910 Japan | January 4, 2009 | 1944 | Nominated jointly (Note: "for work on the physiology of the nervous system, as well as work on isolation of single nerve fibers and muscle fibers and demonstration of the existence of reflex excitatory fibers and reflex inhibitory fibers") with G.Kato by A.L.von Muralt the only time |
| | Alfred Vogt | October 31, 1879 Menziken, Switzerland | December 10, 1943 Zürich, Switzerland | 1944 | Nominated posthumously jointly with W.R.Hess by A.L.von Muralt the only time |
| | Mariano Rafael Castex | June 10, 1886 Buenos Aires, Argentina | June 30, 1968 Buenos Aires, Argentina | 1944 | Nominated without motivation by J.Belbey the only time |
| | Edwin Bennett Astwood (Note: "Treatment of thyrotoxicosis with thiourea and thiouracil") | December 19, 1909 Hamilton, Bermuda | February 17, 1976 Hamilton, Bermuda | 1944, 1947, 1948 | |
| | René Jules Dubos (Note: "Demonstrated that soil bacteria can destroy pathogenic bacteria") | February 20, 1901 Saint-Brice-sous-Forêt, France | February 20, 1982 New York, United States | 1944, 1945, 1946, 1949 | |
1945
| | Kouchakoff, Paul Grigor'evich (Note: "Work on digestional leucocytosis") | 1881 Uman, Russian Empire | August 4, 1946 Lausanne, Switzerland | 1945 | Nominated by Charles Perret (1880 or 1881 – 1960) the only time |
| | Wilton Robinson Earle (Note: "for the successful transformation in vitro of normal mammalian cells into cancer cells") | June 22, 1902 Greenville, South Carolina, United States | May 30, 1964 Burtonsville, Maryland, United States | 1945 | Nominated with Alexander Fleming and Ern.W.Goodpasture by professor of ophthalmology William Thornwall Davis (14.1.1877 Little Rock - 16.6.1944 Washington) from Washington, D.C. the only time |
| | Torbjörn Oskar Caspersson (Note: "Discovery of the function of the nucleolus in nucleotide-protein synthesis") | October 15, 1910 Motala, Sweden | December 7, 1997 Salem, Sweden | 1944, 1945, 1951, 1953, 1956 | Nominated for the Nobel Prize in Chemistry too |
| | Homer William Smith (Note: "Work on the physiology of the kidneys") | January 2, 1895 Denver, United States | March 25, 1962 New York, United States | 1945, 1946, 1948, 1950, 1955, 1956 | |
1946
| | Carl Ferdinand Cori (Note: "Enzymatic synthesis of glycogen and starch, effect of the anterior pituitary extract and of insulin on the hexokinase reaction") | December 5, 1896 Prague, Austria-Hungary | October 20, 1984 Cambridge, Massachusetts, United States | 1946, 1947 | Shared the 1947 Nobel Prize in Physiology or Medicine (Note: “for their discovery of the course of the catalytic conversion of glycogen”) with B.Alb.Houssay |
| | Gerty Theresa Cori | August 15, 1896 Prague, Austria-Hungary | October 26, 1957 Glendale, Missouri, United States | 1946, 1947 | Shared the 1947 Nobel Prize in Physiology or Medicine with B.Alb.Houssay |
| | Selman Abraham Waksman (Note: "Work on soil micro-organisms, development of streptothricin and streptomycin") | July 22, 1888 Nova Pryluka, Kyiv Governorate, Russian Empire | August 16, 1973 Woods Hole, Massachusetts, United States | 1946, 1947, 1948, 1949, 1950, 1951, 1952 | Won the 1952 Nobel Prize in Physiology or Medicine (Note: “for his discovery of streptomycin, the first antibiotic effective against tuberculosis”) and nominated for the Nobel Prize in Chemistry too |
| | Hans Adolf Krebs (Note: "Discovery of the mechanism of urea formation in mammals, oxidative decomposition of d-amino acids and carbohydrates") | August 25, 1900 Hildesheim, Kingdom of Prussia, German Empire | November 22, 1981 Oxford, England | 1946, 1949, 1950, 1951, 1952, 1953 | Shared the 1953 Nobel Prize in Physiology or Medicine (Note: “for his discovery of the citric acid cycle”) with Fr.Alb.Lipmann and nominated for the Nobel Prize in Chemistry too |
| | Ragnar Arthur Granit (Note: "Physiology of the retina") | October 30, 1900 Riihimäki, Finland, Russian Empire | March 12, 1991 Stockholm, Sweden | 1946, 1947, 1948, 1949, 1951, 1952, 1953, 1955, 1956 | Shared the 1967 Nobel Prize in Physiology or Medicine with H.K.Hartline and G.Wald (Note: “for their discoveries concerning the primary physiological and chemical visual processes in the eye”) |
| | Paul Läuger (Note: "Work on DDT") | January 16, 1896 Basel, Switzerland | June 4, 1959 Gentilino, Switzerland | 1946 | Nominated for the Nobel Prize in Chemistry too |
| | Oscar Riddle (Note: "Discovery and production of the lactotropic hormone of the anterior hypophysis") | September 27, 1877 Cincinnati, Indiana, United States | November 29, 1968 Plant City, Florida, United States | 1946 | Nominated by Fr.Verzár the only time |
| | Engelgardt, Vladimir Aleksandrovich | December 3, 1894 Moscow, Russian Empire | July 10, 1984 Moscow, Russia | 1946 | Nominated jointly (Note: "The chemistry of muscle; discovery of the enzymatic properties of myosin) by L.Abg.Orbeli the only time |
| | Ljubimova, Militsa Nikolaevna | January 7, 1899 Kazan (?), Russian Empire | December 22, 1975 Moscow, Russia | 1946 | Nominated jointly by L.Abg.Orbeli the only time |
| | Frédéric Hippolyte Jean Bosc (Note: "for his work on parasitic epithelioma") | 1867 Aubin, France | October 1, 1945 Montpellier, France | 1946 | Nominated posthumously by Georges Massabuau from the University of Montpellier the only time |
| | Max Maurice Strumia (Note: "for work on plasma and human blood fractionation and its great use in the Armed Forces of the US") | September 23, 1896 Turin, Kingdom of Italy | January 13, 1972 Bryn Mawr, Pennsylvania, United States | 1946 | Nominated by Joseph Cooper Birdsall from the University of Pennsylvania the only time |
| | Manuel Dias de Abreu (Note: "Introduction of collective radiology photography, "abreuography"") | January 4, 1892 São Paulo, Brazil | January 30, 1962 Rio de Janeiro, Brazil | 1946, 1951, 1953 | |
| | Philip Levine (Note: "Correlation between the Rh factor and erythroblastosis foetalis") | September 10, 1900 Kletsk, Russian Empire | October 18, 1987 New York, United States | 1946, 1950, 1952, 1953 | |
| | William Cumming Rose (Note: "Work on amino acids") | April 4, 1887 Greenville, South Carolina, United States | September 25, 1985 Urbana, Illinois, United States | 1946, 1947, 1949, 1955 | Nominated for the Nobel Prize in Chemistry too |
| | Alexander Solomon Wiener (Note: "Discovery of the Rh factor") | March 16, 1907 New York, United States | November 6, 1976 New York City, United States | 1946, 1949, 1950, 1951, 1952, 1953, 1955 | |
1947
| | John Boyd Orr (Note: "Work on nutritional physiology, and the importance of the application of these findings to human health and nutrition (Three publications are mentioned: 1. "The national food supply and its influence on public health", Chadwick Lecture, 1934; 2. "The economics of diet", Presidential Address to British Association, 1935; 3. "Food, Health and Income", book, 1936)") | September 23, 1880 Kilmaurs, Scotland | June 25, 1971 Edzell, Scotland | 1947 | Won the 1949 Nobel Peace Prize (Note: “for his lifelong effort to conquer hunger and want, thereby helping to remove a major cause of military conflict and war”) |
| | Norbert Goormaghtigh (Note: "...sa découverte des cellules musculaires afibrillaires, qui seraient à l´origine de l´hypertension artérielle d´origine rénale") | February 14, 1890 Ostende, Belgium | January 2, 1960 Sint-Martens-Latem, Belgium | 1946, 1947 | |
| | Gabriel Emil Bertrand (Note: "Constitution of enzymes and their catalythic elements") | May 17, 1867 Paris, France | June 20, 1962 Paris, France | 1947 | Nominated for the Nobel Prize in Chemistry too |
| | Neil Hamilton Fairley (Note: "Incidence transmission and control of malaria in the Southwest Pacific") | July 15, 1891 Inglewood, Victoria, Australia | April 19, 1966 Sonning, England | 1947 | |
| | Thomas Graham Brown (Note: "The interaction of "half-centers" as a basic explanation of rhythmic progression movements and breathing") | March 27, 1882 Edinburgh, Scotland | October 28, 1965 Edinburgh, Scotland | 1947 | Nominated by Robert E. Gesell (23.6.1886 Alma - 19.4.1954 Ann Arbor) the only time |
| | Irvin Forest Huddleson (Note: "Work on brucellos") | October 17, 1893 Murphysville, Mason County, Kentucky, United States | May 26, 1964 | 1947 | Nominated by Pedro Pablo Pinero Garcia (19.2.1885 Rosario - 21.7.1949) the only time |
| | Thomas Francis Jr. (Note: "Studies of the nature of Influenza and procedures for the prevention and control of the disease") | July 15, 1880 Gas City, Indiana, United States | October 1, 1969 Ann Arbor, Michigan, United States | 1947 | Nominated by John Sundwall (12.6.1880 Fairview - 13.12.1950 Ann Arbor) the only time |
| | Daniel Cody Darrow (Note: "Behavior of intracellular and extracellular water and electrolytes and treatment of badly dehydrated infants by the inclusion of potassium salts in the replenishment fluids") | February 18, 1895 Fargo, North Dakota, United States | June 20, 1965 | 1947 | Nominated by Arild (or Alfred?) Edsten Hansen (2.6.1899 Minneapolis - 16.10.1962 Oakland) the only time |
| | Alan Gregg (Note: "Fostering of medical research and medical education") | July 11, 1890 Colorado Springs, United States | June 19, 1957 Big Sur, United States | 1947 | Nominated by Bradley Merrill Patten (1889-1971) the only time |
| | Samuel Phillips Bedson (Note: "Mechanism of immunity to virus diseases and the morphology of viruses (psittacosis virus)") | December 1, 1886 Newcastle upon Tyne, England | May 11, 1969 | 1947 | Nominated by H.M.Turnbull the only time |
| | Horton Corwin Hinshaw Sr. | August 1, 1902 Iowa Falls, United States | December 28, 2000 San Rafael, California, United States | 1947 | Nominated jointly (Note: "Identification of streptomycin and experimental and clinical investigation of its properties and of other antibiotic agents") with S.Abr.Waksman and W.H.Feldman only |
| | William Hugh Feldman (Note: "The basis for use of streptomycin against turberculosis") | November 30, 1892 Glasgow, Scotland | January 15, 1974 Rochester, Minnesota, United States | 1947, 1951 | |
| | Melvin Henry Knisely (Note: "Agglutination of erythrocytes in vivo in mammals") | June 17, 1904 Hillman, Michigan, United States | March 30, 1975 Charleston, South Carolina, United States | 1947, 1948, 1949, 1951 | |
| | Jacques Charpy (Note: "Treatment of lupus with vitamin D2") | March 13, 1900 Montluçon, France | August 1957 Is-sur-Tille, France | 1947, 1951, 1952 | |
| | James-Paul Reilly (Note: "Role of the neurotrophism of the typhoidendotoxin and the vegetative nervous system for the symptoms of typhus and for the mechanism of the infection and immunitysystem") | March 6, 1887 Landerneau, France | December 24, 1974 Paris, France | 1947, 1952, 1953 | |
| | Edward Charles Dodds (Note: "Discovery of synthetic oestrogens, especially stilboestrol (diethylstilbestrol, DES) and their effects") | October 13, 1899 Liverpool, England | December 16, 1973 Paddington, London, England | 1947, 1948, 1954 | Nominated for the Nobel Prize in Chemistry too |
| | John Joseph Bittner (Note: "Spontaneous cancer in mice, mother´s milk as carcinogenic factor") | February 25, 1904 Meadville, Pennsylvania, United States | December 14, 1961 | 1947, 1948, 1951, 1955 | |
| | Alfred Blalock (Note: "Surgical treatment of malformations of the heart") | April 5, 1899 Culloden, Georgia, United States | September 15, 1964 Baltimore, United States | 1947, 1948, 1949, 1950, 1951, 1952, 1953, 1955, 1956 | |
| | Helen Brooke Taussig (Note: "Inborn malformation in the heart") | May 24, 1898 Cambridge, Massachusetts, United States | May 20, 1986 Kennett Square, Pennsylvania, United States | 1947, 1949, 1950, 1951, 1952, 1953, 1955, 1956 | |
1948
| | Paul Hermann Müller (Note: "Discovery of the potent insecticidal effect of DDT") | January 12, 1899 Olten, Switzerland | October 13, 1965 Basel, Switzerland | 1946, 1948 | Won the 1948 Nobel Prize in Physiology or Medicine (Note: “for his discovery of the high efficiency of DDT as a contact poison against several arthropods”) |
| | Fritz Albert Lipmann (Note: "Studies on the energetic importance of phosphoric acid in the functioning of muscle") | June 12, 1899 Königsberg, German Empire | July 24, 1986 Poughkeepsie, New York, United States | 1948, 1949, 1951, 1953 | Shared the 1953 Nobel Prize in Physiology or Medicine (Note: “for his discovery of co-enzyme A and its importance for intermediary metabolism”) with H.Ad.Krebs and nominated for the Nobel Prize in Chemistry too |
| | George Wells Beadle (Note: "Microbiological methods, particularly methods utilizing mutants of Neurospora, for determining amino acids, vitamins and their precursors") | October 22, 1903 Wahoo, Nebraska, United States | June 9, 1989 Pomona, California, United States | 1948, 1949, 1950, 1952, 1953, 1955, 1956 | Shared the 1958 Nobel Prize in Physiology or Medicine (Note: “for their discovery that genes act by regulating definite chemical events”) with J.Lederberg and nominated for the Nobel Prize in Chemistry too |
| | Edward Lawrie Tatum | December 14, 1909 Boulder, Colorado, United States | November 5, 1975 New York, United States | 1948, 1953, 1954, 1955, 1956 | Shared the 1958 Nobel Prize in Physiology or Medicine with J.Lederberg and nominated for the Nobel Prize in Chemistry too |
| | Frank Macfarlane Burnet (Note: "A new principle in treating viral diseases: destruction of the substrate through which virus particles enter susceptible cells") | September 3, 1899 Traralgon, Australia | August 31, 1985 Port Fairy, Australia | 1948, 1949, 1950, 1953, 1954, 1955, 1956 | Shared the 1960 Nobel Prize in Physiology or Medicine with P.Br.Medawar (Note: “for discovery of acquired immunological tolerance”) |
| | Karl Ritter von Frisch (Note: "Color and sound perception in fish; color perception in bees and bee´s methods of communication") | November 20, 1886 Vienna, Austria-Hungary | June 12, 1982 Munich, Germany | 1948, 1951, 1954, 1956 | Shared the 1973 Nobel Prize in Physiology or Medicine with K.Z.Lorenz and N.Tinbergen (Note: “for their discoveries concerning organization and elicitation of individual and social behaviour patterns”) |
| | Jaroslav Heyrovský (Note: "The polarographic method and its biological applications") | December 20, 1890 Prague, Austria-Hungary | March 27, 1967 Prague, Czechia | 1948, 1949, 1953 | Won the 1959 Nobel Prize in Chemistry (Note: “for his work on biochemically important sulphur compounds, especially for the first synthesis of a polypeptide hormone”) and nominated for the Nobel Prize in Physics too |
| | Karl Lenggenhager (Note: "Coagulation and thrombosis of blood, especially plasmaprokinin and plasmakinin as well as thrombocatalysin") | April 19, 1903 Chur, Switzerland | July 25, 1989 Bern, Switzerland | 1948 | Nominated by Ed.Glanzmann the only time |
| | Jan Wolf (Note: "Development of the "micro relief method" for microscopic study of tissue surfaces") | May 13, 1894 Nový Bydžov, Austria-Hungary | January 10, 1977 Prague, Czechia | 1948 | Nominated by Karel Hübschmann (Prague: 13.8.1890-22.8.1981) the only time |
| | Ernest Basil Verney (Note: "Described factors controlling release of the antidiuretic hormone") | August 22, 1894 Cardiff, Wales | August 19, 1967 Cambridge, England | 1948, 1950, 1952 | |
| | Lucio Bini (Note: "Work concerning electroshock treatment of psychosis") | September 18, 1908 Rome, Kingdom of Italy | August 15, 1964 Rome, Italy | 1948, 1949, 1950, 1952 | |
| | Chester Hamlin Werkman | June 17, 1893 Fort Wayne, Indiana, United States | September 10, 1962 Ames, Iowa, United States | 1948, 1949 | Nominated jointly (Note: "Discovery of the carbon dioxide assimilation process in heterotrophic organisms") and for the Nobel Prize in Chemistry too |
| | Harland Goff Wood | September 2, 1907 Delavan, Minnesota, United States | September 12, 1991 Cleveland, United States | 1948, 1949, 1953 | Nominated jointly and for the Nobel Prize in Chemistry too |
| | Clarence Crafoord (Note: "Surgical treatment of isthmus aortae") | May 28, 1899 Hudiksvall, Sweden | February 25, 1984 Danderyd, Sweden | 1948, 1951, 1953, 1955, 1956 | |
| | Georgios Nikolaou Papanikolaou (Note: "Development of a cytologic method for early diagnosis of uteral cancer") | May 13, 1883 Kymi, Greece | February 19, 1962 Miami, United States | 1948, 1949, 1951, 1953, 1954, 1955, 1956 | |
| | Maurice Sourdille | October 25, 1885 Nantes, France | September 20, 1961 Paris, France | 1948, 1949, 1950, 1951, 1953 | Often nominated jointly (Note: "Surgical treatment of otosclerosis") or by each other |
| | Nils Gunnar Frithiofsson Holmgren | August 27, 1875 Uppsala, Sweden | September 6, 1954 Hedvig Eleonora Parish, Sweden | 1948, 1949, 1953, 1955 | Often nominated jointly or by each other |
1949
| | Julius Lempert | July 4, 1890 Lublin, Lublin Governorate, Russian Empire | December 14, 1968 New York, United States | 1949, 1950, 1951, 1953, 1955 | Nominated jointly (Note: "Work on otosclerosis, and a surgical means for the restoration of practical hearing in certain cases of clinical otosclerosis") with or by N.G.Fr.Holmgren only |
| | Haldan Keffer Hartline (Note: "Work on the electro-physiology of the eye") | December 22, 1903 Bloomsburg, Pennsylvania, United States | March 17, 1983 Fallston, Maryland, United States | 1949, 1951 | Shared the 1967 Nobel Prize in Physiology or Medicine with R.A.Granit and G.Wald |
| | William Mansfield Clark | August 17, 1884 Tivoli, New York, United States | January 19, 1964 Baltimore, United States | 1949 | Nominated jointly (Note: "Work in the fields of oxidation-reduction equilibria and pH measurement") with L.Michaelis by Eric Glendinning Ball (12.7.1904 Coventry - 4.9.1979 Falmouth) the only time |
| | André Gratia (Note: "Work on antibiotics, especially from species of Actinomyces and intestinal bacteria. Studies on bacteriophages, ultravirus and infra-cellular particles") | July 8, 1893 Saint-Gilles, Belgium | October 6, 1950 Nyon, Switzerland | 1946, 1949, 1950 | |
| | Karl August Folkers (Note: "Work on the chemistry of streptomycin") | September 1, 1906 Decatur, Illinois, United States | December 7, 1997 New London, Connecticut, United States | 1949, 1951, 1952 | Nominated for the Nobel Prize in Chemistry too |
| | Hallowell Davis (Note: " "All-or-None Law" of the nerve impulse. Work on the physiology of hearing") | August 31, 1896 New York, United States | August 22, 1992 St. Louis, United States | 1949 | Nominated jointly with R.Lorente de Nó by Al.Forbes the only time |
| | Rafael Lorente de Nó (Note: "Electrophysiology of the nervous system") | April 8, 1902 Zaragoza, Spain | April 2, 1990 Tucson, United States | 1949, 1950, 1952, 1953 | |
| | Hans Mauß | April 16, 1901 Barmen, German Empire | April 5, 1953 Wuppertal-Barmen, Germany | 1949, 1952 | Nominated jointly (Note: "Discovery of Atabrin (quinocrin hydrochloride), an antimalarial agent") with Fr.Mietzsch only |
| | Walter Kikuth | December 21, 1896 Riga, Governorate of Livonia, Russian Empire | July 5, 1968 Düsseldorf, Germany | 1949, 1952, 1953 | Nominated jointly with Fr.Mietzsch only |
| | Norman McAlister Gregg (Note: "Discovery that maternal rubella was responsible for congenital cataract. Work on other disorders such as deafness and dementia paralytica") | March 7, 1892 Burwood, New South Wales, Australia | July 27, 1966 Woollahra, Australia | 1949, 1953, 1954, | |
| | Fritz Mietzsch | May 28, 1896 Dresden, German Empire | November 29, 1958 Wuppertal-Elberfeld, Germany | 1940, 1949, 1952, 1953 | |
| | Paul Rufus Burkholder (Note: "Discovery of Chloromycetin") | February 1, 1903 Orrstown, Pennsylvania, United States | August 11, 1972 | 1949 | Nominated jointly with S.Abr.Waksman and B.M.Duggar by Ch.H.Stuart-Harris the only time |
| | Benjamin Minge Duggar (Note: "Discovery of Aureomycin") | September 1, 1872 Gallion, Alabama, United States | September 10, 1956 New Haven, Connecticut, United States | 1949, 1955 | |
| | Rudolph Albert Peters (Note: "Work on dimercaptopropanol and its importance in protection against poisoning by certain metals") | April 13, 1889 Kensington, London, England | January 29, 1982 Cambridge, England | 1949, 1950, 1953, 1954, 1955 | Nominated for the Nobel Prize in Chemistry too |
| | Claude Schaeffer Beck | November 8, 1894 Shamokin, Pennsylvania, United States | October 14, 1971 Cleveland, United States | 1949, 1952 | Nominated jointly (Note: "Experimental studies, and surgical treatment of malformations of the heart") with Alfr.Blalock, H.Br.Taussig and R.Edw.Gross by G.H.Whipple only |
| | Robert Edward Gross | July 2, 1905 Baltimore, United States | October 11, 1988 Plymouth, Massachusetts, United States | 1949, 1951, 1952, 1955, 1956 | Nominated with Alfr.Blalock only |
| | Edward Joseph Conway (Note: "Work on the permeability of the cell wall for ions, and ionic equilibrium") | July 3, 1894 Nenagh, Ireland | December 29, 1968 | 1949, 1955, 1956 | Nominated for the Nobel Prize in Chemistry too |
| | Choh Hao Li | April 21, 1913 Guangzhou, China | November 28, 1987 United States | 1949, 1952, 1956 | Nominated for the Nobel Prize in Chemistry too |
| | János Hugo Bruno "Hans" Selye (Note: "Work on endocrinology, and especially the adaptation syndrome") | January 26, 1907 Vienna, Austria-Hungary | October 16, 1982 Montreal, Quebec, Canada | 1949, 1950, 1951, 1952, 1953, 1955, 1956 | |
