= Paravertebral block =

Technique used in medicine in order to ease chest pain

Paravertebral block (often known as PVB) is a technique used in medicine in order to ease chest pain. An analgetic agent, usually Bupivacaine or morphine, is injected into a narrow space that lies next to the spine. A fine tube is left in place in order to re-administer the local anesthetic whenever necessary. Complications of the paravertebral block are rare. They include vascular or lung injury, hypotension and pneumothorax. Paravertebral block is used in thoracic surgery (lung resections, rib fractures), general surgery (as in cholecystectomy, inguinal hernia surgery, liver surgery and breast surgery).

== Uses ==
PVB is can be employed whenever relief from acute or chronic pain is required or anticipated in the chest or abdomen. It is particularly beneficial in scenarios involving breast, thoracic, renal, or abdominal surgery, as it can effectively alleviate pain. Additionally, PVB can prove valuable in managing acute pain conditions, such as rib trauma, as well as in cases of chronic pain.

== History ==
Paravertebral block was initially described by Hugo Sellheim of Leipzig in 1905, but the technique was rarely used until the 1980s, when new interest on the technique arose. It gained further popularity in the last two decades.

== Bibliography ==
- Batra, Ravinder Kumar; Krishnan, Krithika; Agarwal, Anil (2011). "Paravertebral Block". Journal of Anaesthesiology Clinical Pharmacology. 27 (1). Wolters Kluwer -- Medknow Publications: 5–11. doi:10.4103/0970-9185.76608. PMC 3146159. PMID 21804697.
- Ardon, Alberto E; Lee, Justin; Franco, Carlo D.; Riutort, Kevin T.; Greengrass, Roy A. (2020-10-01). "Paravertebral block: anatomy and relevant safety issues". Korean Journal of Anesthesiology. 73 (5). The Korean Society of Anesthesiologists: 394–400. doi:10.4097/kja.20065. ISSN 2005-6419. PMC 7533185. PMID 32172551.
- Slinchenkova, Kateryna; Lee, Kay; Choudhury, Shivaditya; Sundarapandiyan, Divya; Gritsenko, Karina (2023-06-09). "A Review of the Paravertebral Block: Benefits and Complications". Current Pain and Headache Reports. 27 (8). Springer Science and Business Media LLC: 203–208. doi:10.1007/s11916-023-01118-1. ISSN 1531-3433. PMID 37294514. S2CID 259118459.
- D’Ercole, Francine; Arora, Harendra; Kumar, Priya A. (2018). "Paravertebral Block for Thoracic Surgery". Journal of Cardiothoracic and Vascular Anesthesia. 32 (2). Elsevier BV: 915–927. doi:10.1053/j.jvca.2017.10.003. ISSN 1053-0770. PMID 29169795.
- Karmakar, Manoj K. (2001-09-01). "Thoracic Paravertebral Block". Anesthesiology. 95 (3). Ovid Technologies (Wolters Kluwer Health): 771–780. doi:10.1097/00000542-200109000-00033. ISSN 0003-3022. PMID 11575553.
- Tighe, SQM; Greene, Michelle D; Rajadurai, Nirmal (2010). "Paravertebral block". Continuing Education in Anaesthesia Critical Care & Pain. 10 (5). Elsevier BV: 133–137. doi:10.1093/bjaceaccp/mkq029. ISSN 1743-1816.
