= Samuel Ottmar Mast =

American zoologist

Samuel Ottmar Mast (5 October 1871 – 3 February 1947) was an American zoologist who studied behavioural physiology, particularly the response to light in protozoa. He also proposed the tail-contraction model of sol-gel based amoeboid locomotion. He served as a professor of zoology at Johns Hopkins University.

Mast was born in Washtenaw County, Michigan to German immigrants Ferdinand Friedrich Gottlob and Beata Agnes née Staebler. He went to local schools before joining the State Normal College, Ypsilanti, Michigan where he received a teaching certificate in 1897. He received a BS from the University of Michigan in 1899 and worked on a PhD in zoology at Harvard after which he was involved in teaching, at Hope College, Holland (1899-1908) followed by Goucher College (1909-1911) after which he was invited to join Johns Hopkins University by Herbert Spencer Jennings, directing the zoology department in 1938 just before retiring.

Mast's major contributions included a study of locomotion in amoebae. He suggested that the cytoplasm underwent changes in its qualities in different parts, coining the terms plasmasol and plasmagel. He also examined reactions to light in protozoa and invertebrates including analyses of the spectral sensitivity. He published a book on the topic of light and phototropisms in 1911.

Mast received the Cartwright Prize of 1901 and a M.Pd. degree from Michigan in 1919. Mast married Grace Rebecca Tennent sister of David Hilt Tennent in 1908 and they had three daughters.

== See also ==
- List of nominees for the Nobel Prize in Physiology or Medicine (1940–1949)
