= August Rauber =

German anatomist and embryologist

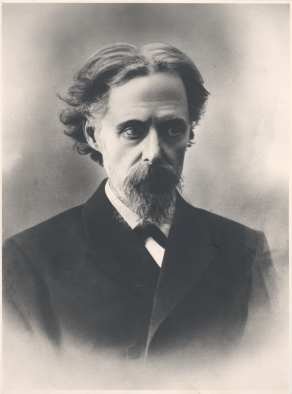
August Rauber (1841–1917)

August Rauber (9 March 1841 – 16 February 1917) was a German anatomist and embryologist who worked for many years at the University of Dorpat (Tartu), in present-day Estonia.

Rauber was born in Obermoschel in the Rhineland-Palatinate, the fourth of five children to Stephan Rauber and Rosalie née Oberlé. He studied medicine at the Ludwig-Maximilians-Universität München, obtaining his doctorate in 1865. At the Ludwig-Maximilians-Universität München, his instructors included Theodor Bischoff (1807–1882), Nicolaus Rüdinger (1832–1896) and Julius Kollmann (1834–1918).

== Career ==
In 1869, he obtained his habilitation, and in 1872 worked as a dissector at the University of Basel. Shortly afterwards, he relocated to Leipzig University, where he worked under Wilhelm His (1831–1904). From 1873 to 1886, he was an associate professor of anatomy and anthropology at Leipzig University.

In 1886, he became a professor of anatomy and head of the anatomical institute at the University of Dorpat. He worked as a professor in Tartu (Dorpat) for 25 years and also started the anatomy collection of the University of Tartu.

In his studies involving the embryonic development of birds and mammals, Rauber is credited with combining comparative embryology and histology with phylogenetic analysis. The eponymous "Rauber's layer" bears his name, being defined as a trophoblastic membrane over the embryonic disk in developing animals.

Rauber's wife was an Estonian, they had a son. He is buried to the New St. John's Cemetery in Tartu.

== Partial list of publications ==
- Vater'sche Körperchen der Bänder- und Periostnerven und ihre Beziehung zum sog. Muskelsinne (1865).
- Untersuchungen über das Vorkommen und die Bedeutung der Vaterschen Körperchen (1867).
- Elasticität und Festigkeit der Knochen, 1876 - Elasticity and strength of bones.
- Über den Ursprung der Milch und die Ernährung der Frucht im Allgemeinen (1879).
- Urgeschichte der Menschen, (two volumes) 1884 - Prehistory of man.
- Homo sapiens ferus (1885) - Homo sapiens ferus.
- Oder die Zustände der Verwilderten und ihre Bedeutung für Wissenschaft, Politik und Schule (1885).
- Über die Bedeutung der wissenschaftlichen Anatomie, 1886 - On the importance of scientific anatomy.
- Atlas der Krystallregeneration (four volumes), 1896/97 - Atlas of "crystal regeneration".
- Die Aufgaben des Lebens (1896).
- Lehrbuch der Anatomie des Menschen (two volumes) - Textbook of human anatomy - (5th edition 1897/98), continued by Friedrich Wilhelm Kopsch (1868-1955).

== Bibliography ==
- Maie Toomsalu, The Legend is Alive: August Antonius Rauber, Professor of Anatomy, University of Tartu, Tartu 2020, pp. 183
