= Friedrich Wilhelm Kopsch =

German anatomist (1868–1955)

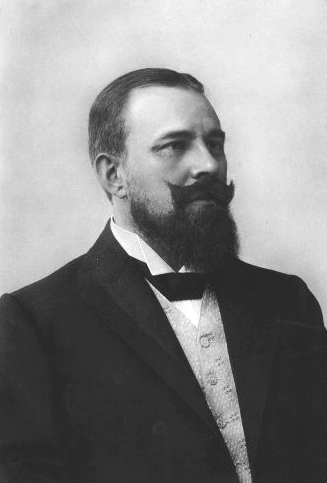
Friedrich Wilhelm Kopsch (1868-1955)

Friedrich Wilhelm Theodor Kopsch (4 March 1868 in Saarbrücken - 24 January 1955 in Berlin) was a German anatomist born in Saarbrücken.

== Life ==
He studied under Heinrich Wilhelm Waldeyer (1836-1921) at the University of Berlin, obtaining his medical doctorate in 1892 with a thesis on the ciliary body and iris of the reptilian eye. In 1898 he received his habilitation in Berlin, and in 1935 was appointed full professor of histology, embryology and anatomy at the institute of Hermann Stieve (1886-1952).

Kopsch published numerous works on comparative anatomy and embryology, and with August Rauber (1841-1917) was co-author of the Lehrbuch und Atlas der Anatomie des Menschen. After Rauber's death, he was its sole author.

== Selected writings ==
- Untersuchungen über Gastrulation and Embryobildung bei den Chordaten (Investigations of gastrulation and embryo formation in chordates), 1904.
- Die morphologische Bedeutung des Keimhautrandes und die Embryobildung bei der Forelle (1904).
- Nervensystem (Nervous system), with August Rauber (1907).
- Die Entwicklung des braunen Grasfrosches Rana fusca Roesel (Development of the brown grass frog), 1952.
- "Nomina anatomica" by Friedrich Kopsch and Karl-Heinrich Knese.
