= Hugo Sellheim =

German physician (1871–1936)

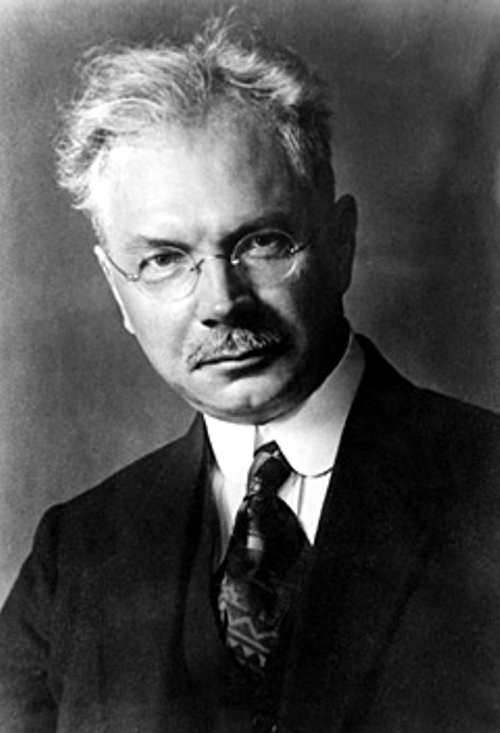
Hugo Sellheim

Hugo Sellheim (December 28, 1871, Biblis bei Worms – April 22, 1936, Leipzig) was a pioneering physician in the field of gynecology and obstetrics. He is credited with performing the first thoracic paravertebral block in 1905, an early contribution to regional anesthesia techniques (Culp & Culp, 2005).

Sellheim became known internationally for his experimental studies on birth mechanics and for introducing inoovative obstetrical teaching models designed to simulate the process of childbirth (Schlünder, 2025)

He was Professor and Chairman of OB/Gyn at the University of Leipzig from 1926 until his death in 1936. He served as the 21st president of the German Society of Gynecology and Obstetrics. He maintained professional relationships with other physicians of his time, including Robert Meyer, with whom he shared interests in reproductive pathology (Meyer, 1948).

Before his appointment at Leipzig, Sellheim trained and worked at the University Women's Clinic in Freiburg under Alfred Hegar, where he became associated with the growing movement of "physiologization" in obstetrics, which emphasized experimentation and the study of normal physiological process rather than only pathological conditions (Schlünder, 2025)

Sellheim was an early investigator into chemical pregnancy tests, the establishment of paternity, the mechanism of rotation of the fetal head during birth, and he conducted experimental studies using models to better understand the mechanics of childbirth (Schlünder, 2025).

Unlike many earlier obstetricians who focused primarily on measurements of the bony pelvis and fetal skull, Sellheim emphasized soft tissues, muscular movement, and the dynamic phsyiological processes involved during labor (Schlünder, 2025)

He also experimented with mechanical models designed to simulate childbirth, although these had limitations in accurately reproducing human birth processes (Harris & Nott, 2020).

One of Sellheim's most famous experiments involved a large glass birthing machine in which his assistant August Mayer attempted to crawl through soap-covered glass tubes to imitate fetal rotation during childbirth. The experiment became well known after Mayer became stuck inside The apparatus (Schlünder, 2025).

These experiments were intended to demonstrate Sellheim's theory that the fetus rotates through the birth canal according to the "law of least constraint," describing how fetal movement adapts to the curved anatomy of the maternal pelvis during labor.

Historians of medicine have identified Sellheim's birthing machines and obstetric phantoms as important predecessors to modern obstetric simulators used in medical education today (Harris & Nott, 2020).

Sellheim also advocated for the use of standardized anatomical terminology in medicine, favoring directional terms such as dorsal, ventral, proximal, and distal in obstetrics instead o less precise positional descriptions (Buklijas, 2017).

His support for standardized anatomical language contributed to broader discussions surrounding the reform of the Nomina Anatomica during the early twentieth century (Buklijas, 2017).

Modern Historians regard Sellheim as an important figure not only in obstetrics and gynecology, but also in the history of medical simultaion, experimental physiology, and material culture in medicine (Schlünder, 2025)
