= Noël Fiessinger =

French physician

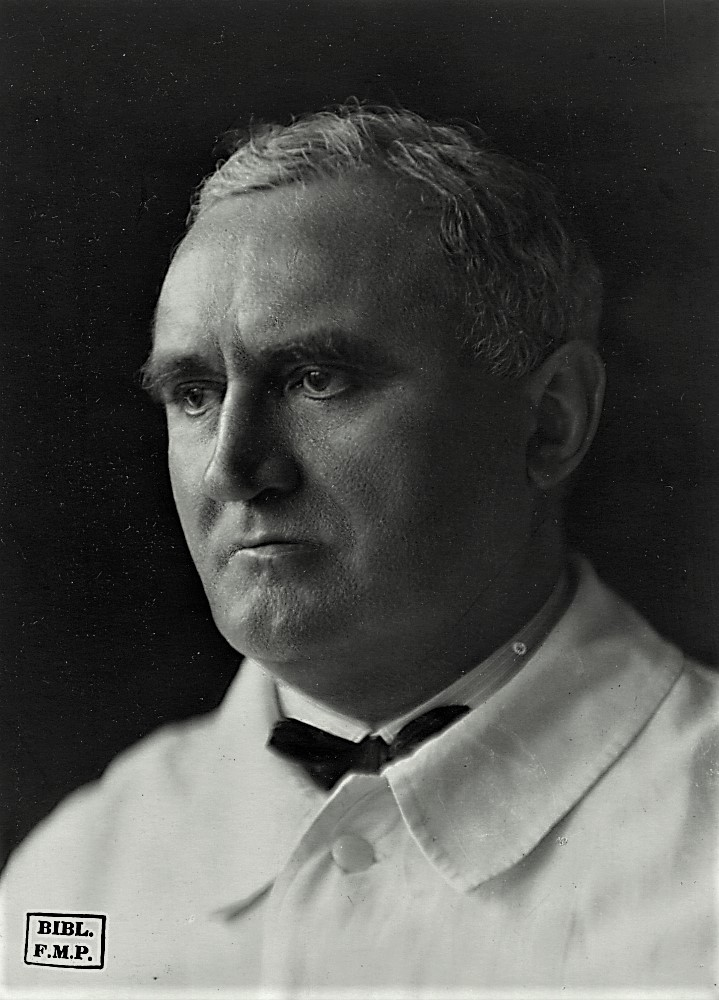

Noël Armand Fiessinger (24 December 1881 – 15 January 1946) was a French physician, educator, and author. He was well known for his books on endocrinology.
