= Wintersheim =

- Municipality
- Coat of arms

- Location of Wintersheim within Mainz-Bingen district
- Interactive map of Wintersheim
- Location within Germany Location within Rhineland-Palatinate
- Coordinates: 49°46′42″N 8°16′49″E
- Country: Germany
- State: Rhineland-Palatinate
- District: Mainz-Bingen
- Municipal assoc.: Rhein-Selz

Government
  - Mayor (2019–24): Thomas Bischmann

Area
  - Total: 3.83 km^{2} (1.48 sq mi)
- Elevation: 190 m (620 ft)

Population (2025-12-31)
  - Total: 302
  - Density: 78.9/km^{2} (204/sq mi)
- Time zone: UTC+01:00 (CET)
  - Summer (DST): UTC+02:00 (CEST)
- Postal codes: 67587
- Dialling codes: 06733
- Vehicle registration: MZ
- Website: www.wintersheim.de

Wintersheim (German pronunciation: [ˈvɪntɐshaɪm]) is an Ortsgemeinde – a municipality belonging to a Verbandsgemeinde, a kind of collective municipality – in the Mainz-Bingen district in Rhineland-Palatinate, Germany.

== Geography ==
=== Location ===
The municipality lies in Rhenish Hesse about 9 km west of the Rhine, between Mainz and Worms. It belongs to the Verbandsgemeinde Rhein-Selz.

== History ==
=== 8th century ===
In 766, Wintersheim had its first documentary mention in the Lorsch codex. On 17 June 766, a man named Hairdin made the first gift to the Lorsch Abbey of a vineyard that yielded 4 Ohm – about 160 L – of wine. Following over the next 40 years were 17 further donations of vineyards. Winegrowing, therefore, must have played an important rôle in the Wintersheim municipal area in the 8th century.

=== 15th to 18th century ===
In 1467, Landgrave Hesso von Leiningen-Dagsburg died. His holdings fell to his sister Margarethe von Leiningen-Westerburg. Her brothers, who were styled von Leiningen-Hartenburg, raised fierce opposition to this, and Margarethe had to call on Elector Palatine Friedrich I for help. She promised the Elector in a partition agreement in 1471 half of the disputed 19 villages for his successful support. After Margarethe's death, her son Reinhard I of Leiningen sold Elector Palatine Philip “the Upright” a share of the villages in question. Among the sold villages was Wintersheim, which thereby became Palatine. Wintersheim received in 1589 a court and village charter. It can be found in the Hessian State Archive, Darmstadt (Hessisches Staatsarchiv Darmstadt) in the “Weistümer” collection under the number 118. In the framework of the Napoleonic Wars, there came the first invasion by French Revolutionary troops. The end of Electoral Palatinate rule came after 1796. Wintersheim was assigned to the canton of Oppenheim.

=== 19th century ===
Wintersheim, Eimsheim and Dolgesheim were united in 1801 at the lowest level of French administration and were given a common mayoralty. With the adoption of the Act of German Confederation, Wintersheim passed with the third province, later known as the Province of Rhenish Hesse (Provinz Rheinhessen), to the Grand Duchy of Hesse. Samuel Dettweiler became Wintersheim's first mayor in 1836. The founding of the Dorn-Dürkheim-Wintersheim savings and load association followed in 1872, and of the consumer association in 1873. In 1875 came the founding of the singing club Einigkeit (“Unity”)

=== 20th century ===
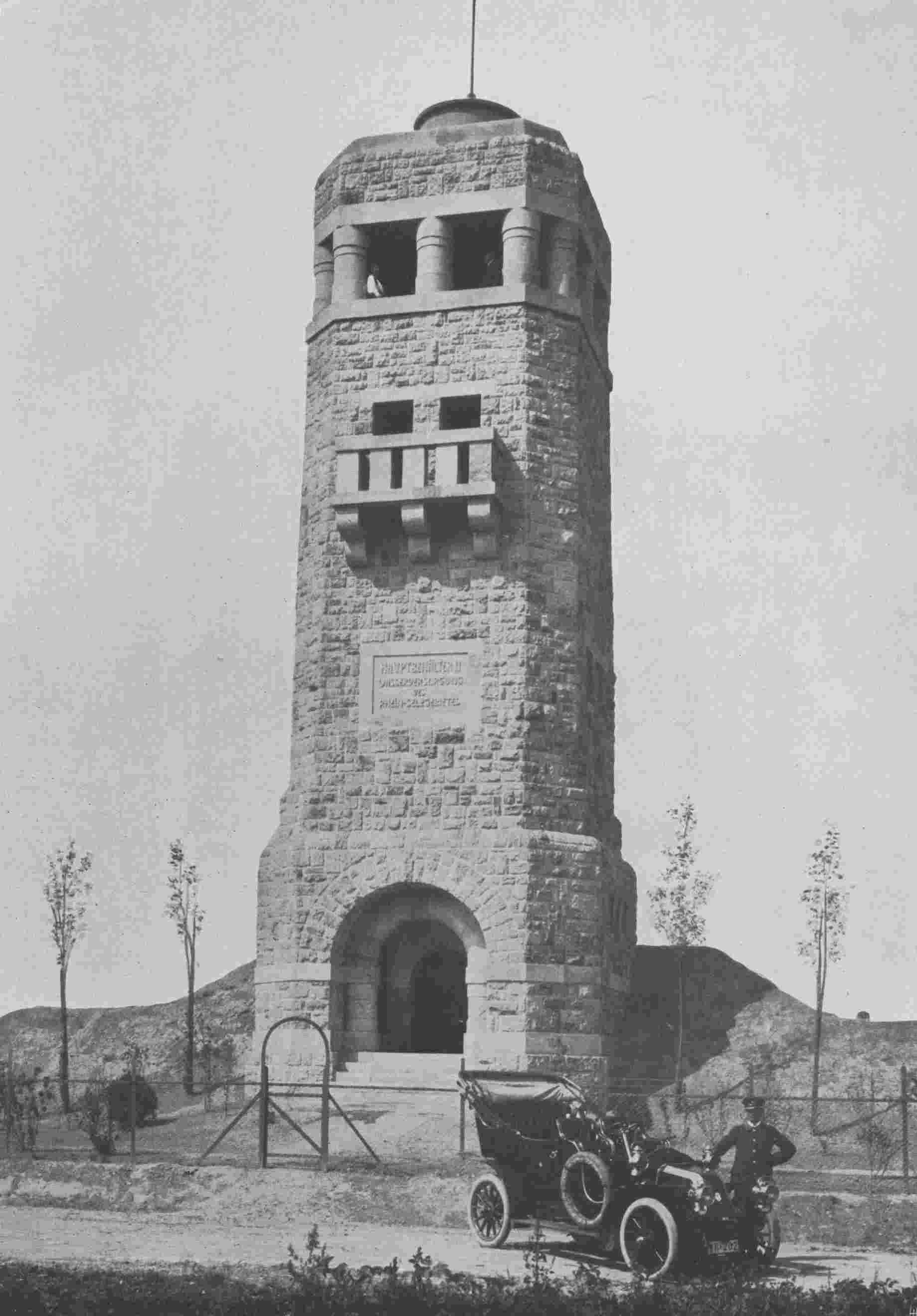
Wintersheim watertower (1907)

- 1906 Building of the water supply network and the Wintersheim watertower
- 1913 Connection to the electricity grid
- 1926 Gymnastic club's founding
- 1954-1958 Flurbereinigung
- 1972 Assignment to the Verbandsgemeinde of Guntersblum
- 1976 Wintersheim gets its own Dorfgemeinschaftshaus (“village community house”)
- 1988 Canal and road building
- 1989 Renovation of the Town Hall (built 1829)

== Politics ==
=== Mayor ===
Thomas Bischmann is the Ortsbürgermeister, elected in May 2019.

=== Coat of arms ===
The municipality's arms might be described thus: Azure a windmill's windshaft and four sails attached thereto in saltire argent.

== Culture and sightseeing ==
=== Buildings ===
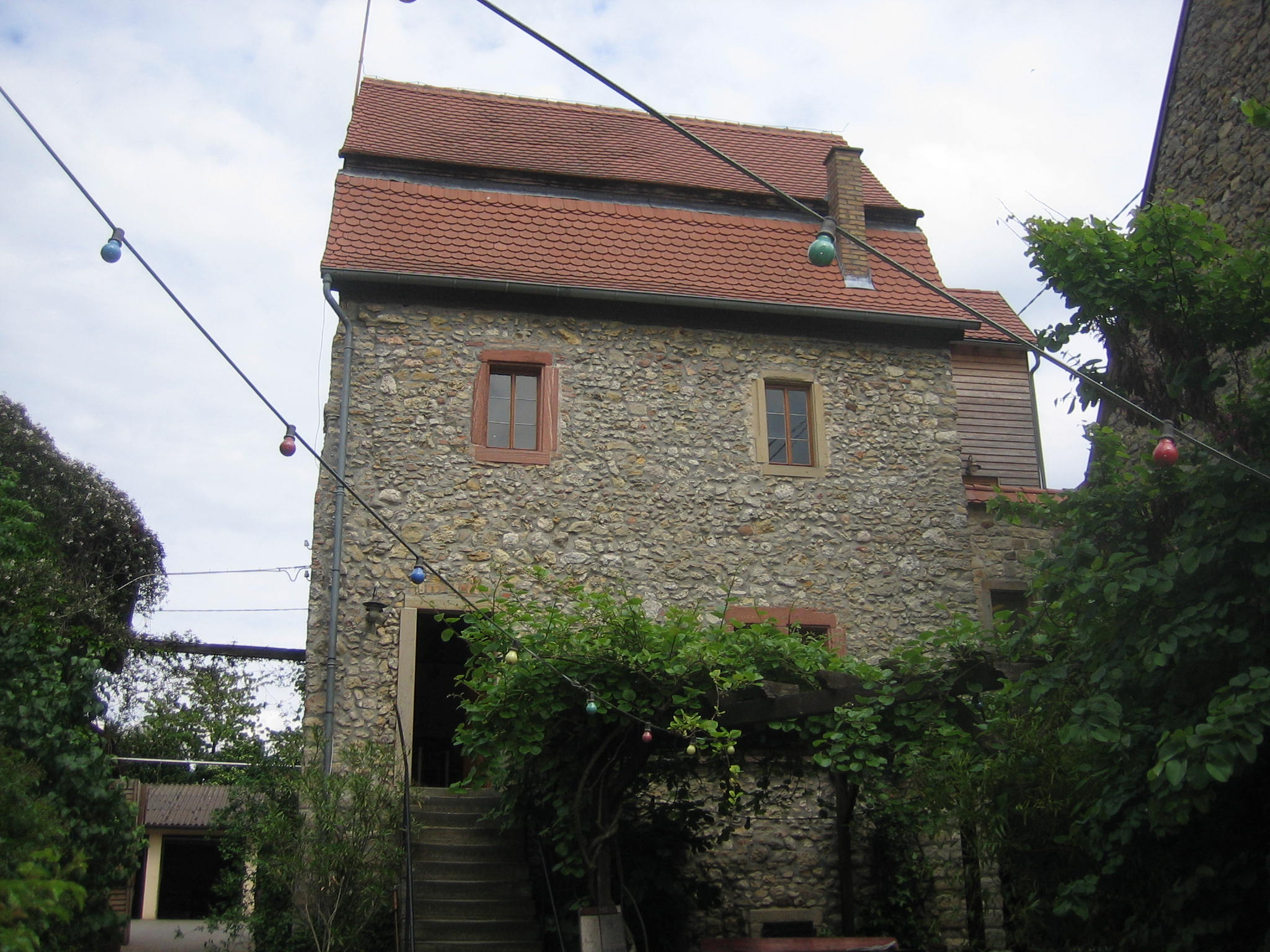
Tower house at the Dätwyl winery

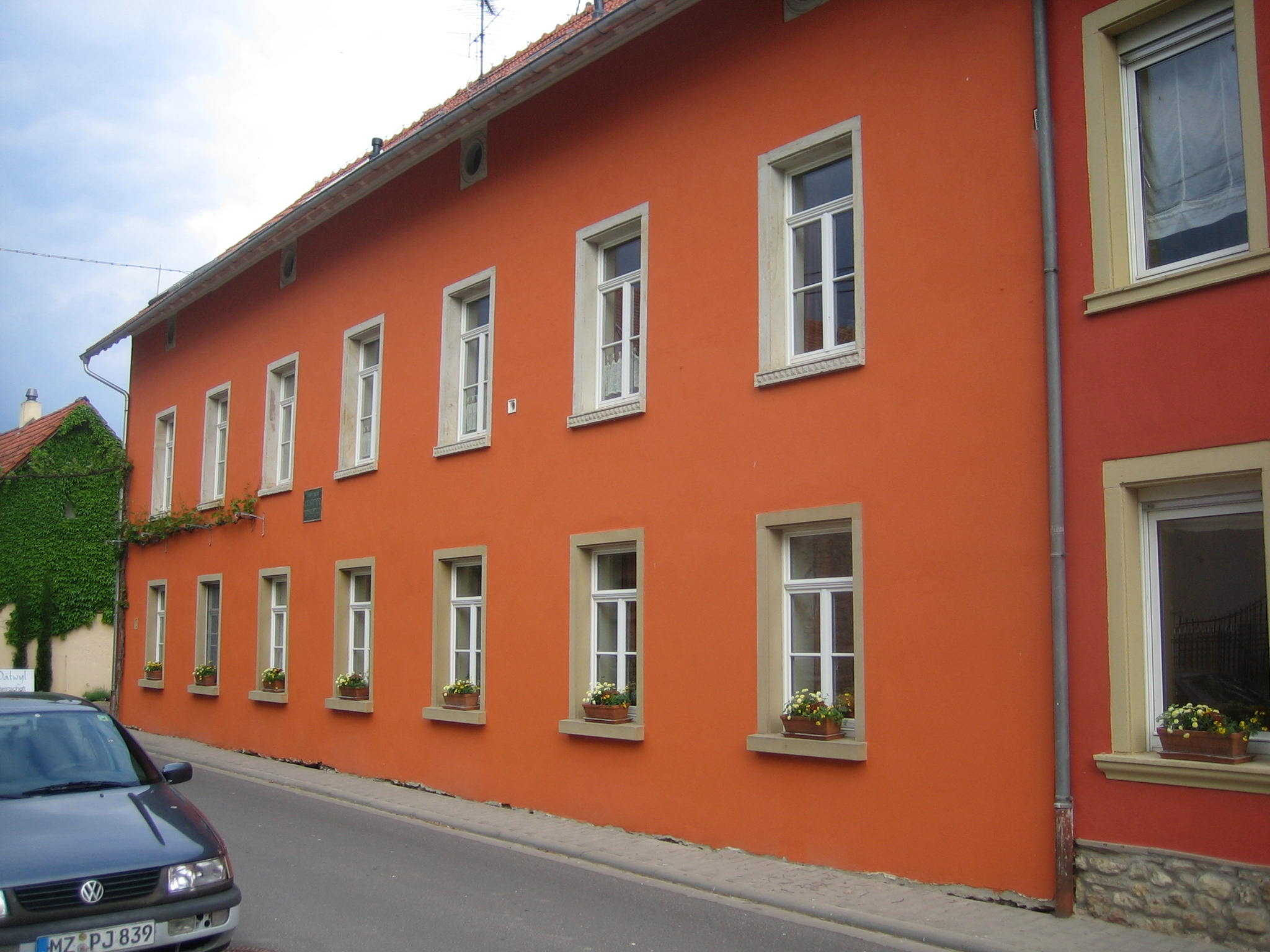
House where German goat-raising pioneer Christian Dettweiler was born

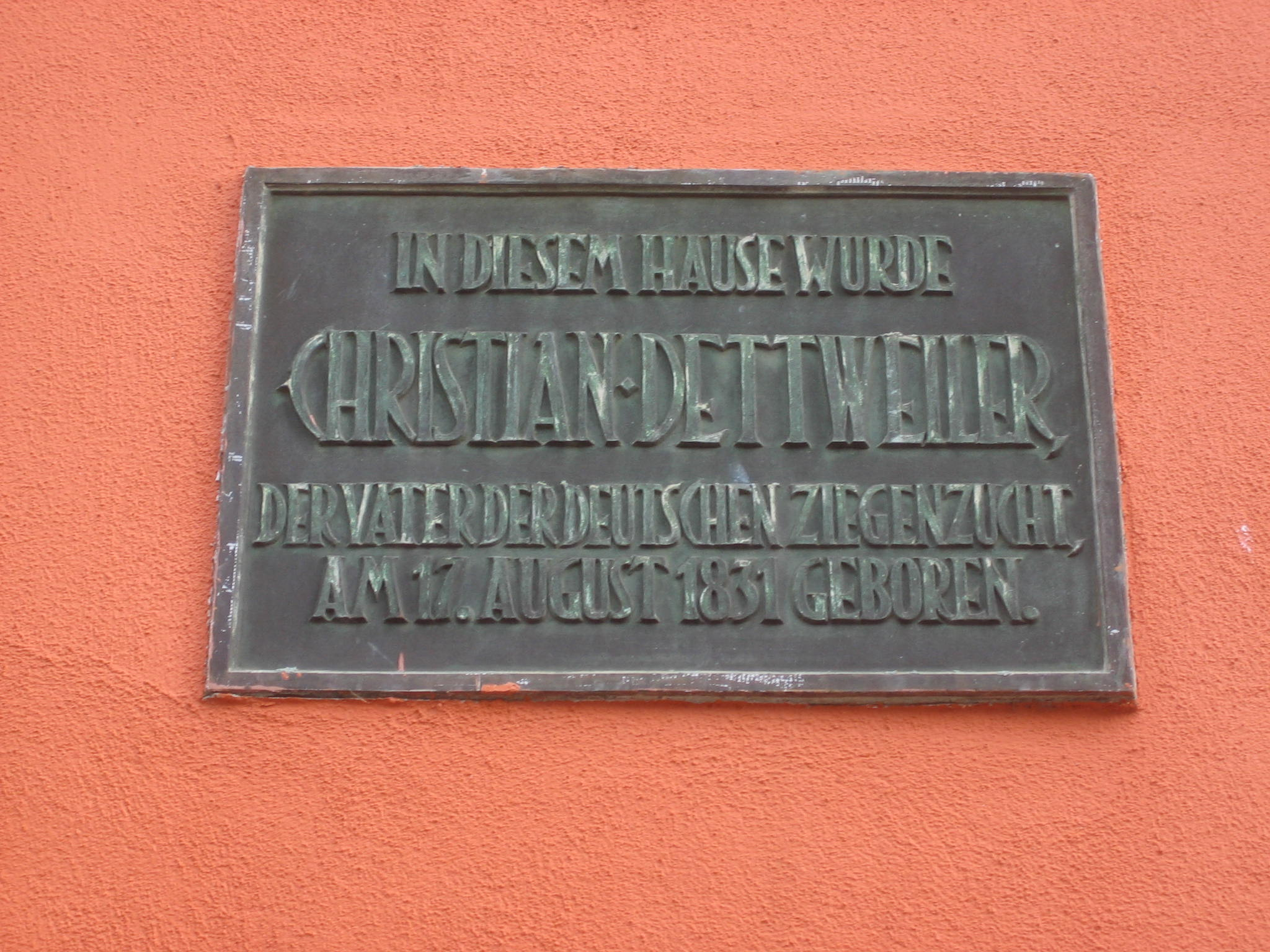
Plaque on the house

A former late mediaeval tower house made of quarrystones comes from the 15th century. In the 18th century it was converted and given a Mansard roof. The tower's cellar dates from 1754. The complex stands at the Dätwyl winery and is still used today as the estate's public house.

The former palatial estate of the Barons of Frayss is a complex whose yard is fully enclosed by buildings, a building form called a Vierseithof (“four-side-yard”) in German. The manor house with its hip Mansard roof comes partly from 1618 (the portal). In the first half of the 18th century it was given a Baroque makeover. Adjoining the complex is a walled garden.

An estate complex that includes a small house with “shield gables” (that is, gables that form part of the façade) from about 1600 together with outbuildings stands at Seilenbachgasse 2. The Town Hall is found in a former school from 1829. It is built with Late Classicist plasterwork with flèches. Rheinhessische Weingewölbe (“Rhenish-Hessian Wine Vaulting”), that is, a cowshed with vaulting resting on columns, from the mid 19th century can be found at Eimsheimer Straße 11.

The Evangelical church was built in 1896 and 1897 by August Ermel, Worms. It is a Gothic Revival “room” church built of hewn stone with a three-sided apse and a hipped roof with a flèche.

=== Regular events ===
The Wintersheimer Weinwandertag (“Wintersheim Wine Hiking Day”) was traditionally held in September as part of the village's kermis (church consecration festival, locally known as the Kerwe). Local winegrowers organized guided walks through the vineyards, where participants could sample regional wines and Sekt. The walking routes typically took between two and a half and three hours and followed paved paths, making them accessible after rainfall. Tours of local wineries were also offered.

== Famous people ==
=== Sons and daughters of the town ===
- Christian Dettweiler (b. 17 August 1831), agriculturalist and father of German goat-raising
- Peter Dettweiler (1837–1904), German lung specialist and sanatorium leader
