= Wilhelm Camerer =

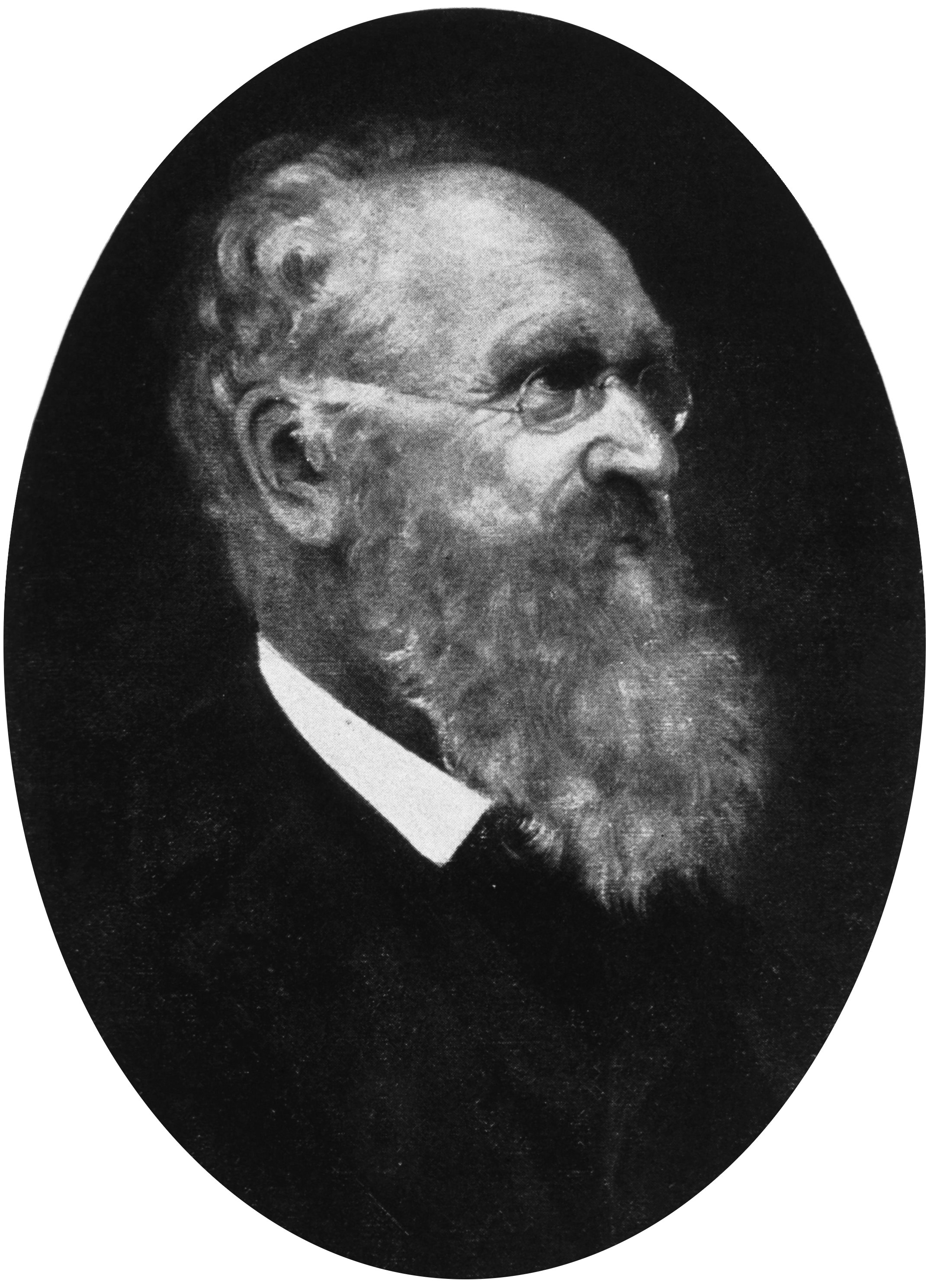
Johann Friedrich Wilhelm Camerer

Johann Friedrich Wilhelm Camerer (17 October 1842 – 25 March 1910) was a German physician born in Stuttgart. Camerer was a pioneer in the field of pediatric medicine.

He studied medicine at the universities of Tübingen and Vienna. At Tübingen he was a student of physiologist Karl von Vierordt (1818–1884). From 1867 to 1876 he was a general practitioner in several communities throughout Württemberg, afterwards working as a physician in the town of Riedlingen (1876–1884). During the Austro-Prussian War (1866) and Franco-Prussian War (1870–71), he served as a military physician.

From 1884 onward, he was a physician based in Urach, where he was later appointed Oberamtsarzt (medical officer). In 1895 he received an honorary degree in natural sciences from the University of Tübingen.

Camerer is remembered for his studies of infant nutrition and psychophysics as well as research involving metabolism in children. In 1894 he published an influential work on childhood metabolism called "Der Stoffwechsel des Kindes", etc. His work in pediatrics included important research on the composition of breast milk.

== Associated eponym ==
- "Camerer's law": Law which states that "children of the same weight have the same food requirements regardless of their ages".
