= Julius Kollmann =

German anatomist, zoologist and anthropologist

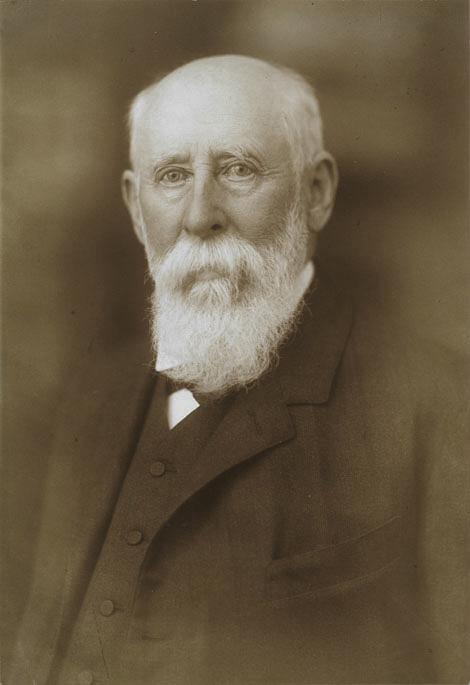
Julius Kollmann

Julius Kollmann (24 February 1834, Holzheim am Forst – 24 June 1918, Basel) was a German anatomist, zoologist and anthropologist.

He studied at the Ludwig-Maximilians-Universität München and the Friedrich Wilhelm University of Berlin, then furthered his education in London and Paris. In 1859, he received his doctorate, qualifying as lecturer at the Ludwig-Maximilians-Universität München in 1862. Beginning in 1878, he served as a full professor of anatomy at the University of Basel. In 1888, he was chosen as university rector.

Known for his work in the fields of descriptive anatomy and histology, he eventually became associated with studies involving evolutionary theory, developmental history and anthropology. In 1884 Kollmann introduced the term "neoteny" to define the transformation process where animals such as newts mature sexually while still in the larval form. As an anthropologist, he conducted analyses of prehistoric skulls found at Auvernier and Schweizersbild.

== Selected works ==
- "Ueber den Verlauf des Lungenmagennerven in der Bauchhöhle", in: Zeitschrift für wissenschaftliche Zoologie, vol. 10, Leipzig 1860, pp. [413]–448.
- Die Entwicklung der Adergeflechte. Ein Beitrag zur Entwicklungsgeschichte des Gehirnes, Leipzig 1861.
- Atlas der allgemeinen thierischen Gewebelehre, 1861 (with Theodor von Hessling and Joseph Albert) – Atlas of general animal histology.
- Mechanik des menschlichen Körpers, München 1874 – Mechanics of the human body.
- Plastische Anatomie des menschlichen Körpers. Ein Handbuch für Künstler und Kunstfreunde, 1886 – Plastic anatomy and the human body.
- Schädel aus alten Gräbern bei Genf (Corsier, Vernier, La Cluse, Petit Sacconez): Zwei Schädel aus Pfahlbauten und die Bedeutung desjenigen von Auvernier für die Rassenanatomie, 1886 – Skulls from ancient burial sites near Geneva.
- Lehrbuch der Entwickelungsgeschichte des Menschen, 1898 - Textbook on the developmental history of humans.
- Der Mensch vom Schweizersbild, 1901 – The human remains from Schweizersbild.
- Pygmaeen in Europa und Amerika, 1902 – Pygmies in Europe and America.
- Handatlas der Entwicklungsgeschichte des Menschen, 1907 – Hand-atlas on the developmental history of humans.
