= List of nominees for the Nobel Prize in Physiology or Medicine (1950–1959) =

The following is a list of people first nominated for the Nobel Prize in Physiology or Medicine between 1950 and 1959 by year of first nomination.

The Nobel Prize in Physiology or Medicine (Swedish: Nobelpriset i fysiologi eller medicin) is awarded annually by the Nobel Assembly at the Karolinska Institute to scientists who have made outstanding contributions in physiology or medicine. It is one of the five Nobel Prizes which were established by the will of Alfred Nobel in 1895.

Every year, the Nobel Committee for Physiology or Medicine sends out forms, which amount to a personal and exclusive invitation, to about three thousand selected individuals to invite them to submit nominations. The names of the nominees are never publicly announced, and neither are they told that they have been considered for the Prize. Nomination records are strictly sealed for fifty years. However, the nominations for the years 1901 to 1953 are publicly available. Despite the annual sending of invitations, the prize was not awarded in nine years (1915–1918, 1921, 1925, 1940–1942) and has been delayed for a year five times (1919, 1922, 1926, 1938, 1943).

From 1901 to 1953, 935 scientists were nominated for the prize, 63 of which were awarded either jointly or individually. 19 more scientists from these nominees were awarded after 1953. Of the 13 women nominees, only G.Th.Cori was awarded the prize. Besides some scientists from these nominees won the prizes in other fields (including years after 1953): J.Boyd Orr - Peace Prize (1949); L.C.Pauling twice - in Chemistry (1954) and Peace Prize (1962); 3 - in Physics and 20 - in Chemistry (including Fr.Sanger twice - in 1958 and 1980).

In addition, nominations of 65 scientists (including one woman) were declared invalid by the Nobel Committee.

== See also ==
- List of nominees for the Nobel Prize in Physiology or Medicine (1901–1909)
- List of nominees for the Nobel Prize in Physiology or Medicine (1910–1919)
- List of nominees for the Nobel Prize in Physiology or Medicine (1920–1929)
- List of nominees for the Nobel Prize in Physiology or Medicine (1930–1939)
- List of nominees for the Nobel Prize in Physiology or Medicine (1940–1949)

== 1950–1959 ==
Picture	Name	Born	Died	Years nominated	Notes
1950
	George Elmer Shambaugh Jr.	June 29, 1903 Chicago, United States	February 7, 1999 Sandwich, Illinois, United States	1950, 1951, 1953	Nominated with J.Lempert and jointly (Note: "Surgical treatment of otosclerosis") with M.Sourdille and with or by N.G.Fr.Holmgren only
	Philip Showalter Hench (Note: "For his studies of the rheumatic disorders")	February 28, 1896 Pittsburgh, Pennsylvania, United States	March 30, 1965 Ocho Rios, Jamaica	1950, 1951	Shared the 1950 Nobel Prize in Physiology or Medicine with Edw.C.Kendall (Note: "for their discoveries relating to the hormones of the adrenal cortex, their structure and biological effects") T.Reichstein nominated for the Nobel Prize in Chemistry too
	Tadeusz Reichstein (Note: "Work on sterins")	July 20, 1897 Włocławek, Warsaw Governorate, Russian Empire	August 1, 1996 Basel, Switzerland	1950	Shared the 1950 Nobel Prize in Physiology or Medicine with Edw.C.Kendall T.Reichstein nominated for the Nobel Prize in Chemistry too
	Georg von Békésy (Note: "Work on the physiology of hearing")	June 3, 1899 Budapest, Austria-Hungary	June 13, 1972 Honolulu, Hawaii, United States	1950, 1954, 1955, 1956	Won the 1961 Nobel Prize in Physiology or Medicine (Note: “for his discoveries of the physical mechanism of stimulation within the cochlea”) and nominated for the Nobel Prize in Physics too
	Charles Brenton Huggins (Note: "Treatment of prostatic cancer with castration and injection of estrogen")	September 22, 1901 Halifax, Nova Scotia, Canada	January 12, 1997 Chicago, United States	1950, 1951, 1955, 1956	Shared the 1966 Nobel Prize in Physiology or Medicine (Note: “for his discoveries concerning hormonal treatment of prostatic cancer”) with Fr.P.Rous
	Archer John Porter Martin (Note: "Discoveries and development of new chemical separation methods based on "counter-current extraction and partition chromatography")	March 1, 1910 London, England	July 28, 2002 Llangarron, England	1950, 1952	Shared the 1952 Nobel Prize in Chemistry (Note: “for their invention of partition chromatography”)
	Richard Laurence Millington Synge	October 28, 1914 Liverpool, England	August 18, 1994 Norwich, England	1950	Shared the 1952 Nobel Prize in Chemistry
	Lyman Creighton Craig	June 12, 1906 Palmyra Township, near Carlisle, Iowa, United States	July 7, 1974 Glen Rock, New Jersey, United States	1950	Nominated jointly with A.J.P.Martin and R.L.M.Synge and for the Nobel Prize in Chemistry too
	David P.C. Lloyd (Note: "Work on the functional organization of the spinal cord and on post-effects in neurons")	September 23, 1911 Auburn, Alabama, United States	April 20, 1985 Carmel, United States	1950	Nominated with R.Lorente de Nó by G.von Bonin the only time
	Georg Rudolf Lieske (Note: "Work on Actinomycetal systematics and lytic action on bacteria")	September 6, 1886 Dresden, German Empire	July 16, 1950 Hamburg, Germany	1950	Died before the only chance to be rewarded
	Gustav Ehrhart (Note: "Work on analgetic and spasmolytic substances, and antihistamine")	December 21, 1894 Ludwigshafen, German Empire	December 11, 1971 Mainz, Germany	1950	Nominated with G.R.Lieske and G.Ramon by H.Ot.Fr.Schlossberger the only time
	Wilbur Augustus Sawyer (Note: "Vaccination against yellow fever")	August 7, 1879 Appleton, Wisconsin, United States	November 12, 1951 Berkeley, California, United States	1950	Nominated with M.Theiler by Antonio S. Navarro the only time
	George Soulié de Morant (Note: "Work on acupuncture")	December 2, 1878 Paris, France	May 10, 1955 Neuilly-sur-Seine, France	1950	Nominated by E.Mériel the only time
	Ludwik Hirszfeld (Note: "Work on blood groups (inheritance, anthropological importance, and "heterospecific pregnancy")")	August 5, 1884 Warsaw, Russian Empire	March 7, 1954 Wrocław, Poland	1950	Nominated by Ernst Witebsky the only time
	Vladimir Filatov (Note: "Work on corneal transplantation and on tissue transplantations in other ocular and some dermal diseases")	February 27, 1875 Mikhailovka village, Penza Governorate, Russian Empire	October 30, 1956 Odesa, Ukraine	1950	Nominated by Gh.Năstase the only time
	Henricus Jacobus Marie (Hak) Weve (Note: "Diathermal coagulation in connection with eye diseases")	April 19, 1888 Nijmegen, Netherlands	January 3, 1962 Utrecht, Netherlands	1950	Nominated by J. P. Maurice Appelmans (1902 Gooik - 1993 Leuven) the only time
	Karl Friedrich Meyer (Note: "Work on brucellosis, coccidiomycosis, encephalitis, and botulismus")	May 19, 1884 Basel, Switzerland	April 27, 1974 San Francisco, United States	1950	
	Babkin, Boris Petrovitch (Note: "Physiology of the digestive glands; his work, "Secretory mechanism of Digestive Glands"")	January 17, 1877 Kursk, Russian Empire	May 3, 1950 train from Atlantic City to Montreal, Canada	1950	Nominated by J.Kaulbersz the only time
	John Tileston Edsall	November 3, 1902 Philadelphia, United States	June 12, 2002 Cambridge, Massachusetts, United States	1950	Nominated jointly (Note: "Work on fractionation and therapeutic applications of plasma proteins") with E.J.Cohn by K.A.A.O.Felix the only time
	Juan César Mussio-Fournier (Note: "Work on endocrinology (treatment of ocular diseases with instillation of pituitary and muscle extracts)")	February 7, 1890 Montevideo, Uruguay	January 1, 1961	1950	Nominated by V.P.Fontana the only time
	Ernst Peter Pick (Note: "Work on antibody production against protein-free iodine-compounds, on sleep-inducing drugs, and on the liver vein barrier")	May 18, 1872 Jermer, Austria-Hungary	January 15, 1960 New York, United States	1950	Nominated by L.Arzt the only time
	Barend Coenraad Petrus Jansen (Note: "The crystallization of vitamin B 1")	April 1, 1884 Zwolle, Netherlands	October 18, 1962 Amsterdam, Netherlands	1950	Nominated with Edw.L.Rickes and E.L.Smith by Bruno Mendel (3.11.1897 Essen - 23.8.1959 Bussum) the only time
	Alfred Georges Bourguignon	August 6, 1876 Paris, France	January 19, 1963 Paris, France	1950, 1951	Nominated jointly (Note: "Work on "chronaxy" and its applications in medicine and neuromuscular physiology") with L.Éd.Lapicque only
	Robert Rössle (Note: "Work on inflammation and allergy")	August 19, 1876 Augsburg, German Empire	November 21, 1956 Berlin, Germany	1950, 1951	
	Frank Norman Wilson (Note: "Fundamental theoretical and practical investigations on the electric phenomena of the heart")	November 19, 1890 Livonia, Michigan, United States	September 11, 1952 Stockbridge, Michigan, United States	1950, 1952	
	Oskar Wintersteiner (Note: "Work on the nature of adrenocortical hormones")	November 19, 1890 Bruck an der Mur, Austria-Hungary	September 11, 1952 Graz, Austria	1950, 1952	
	Timofeev-Ressovsky, Nikolay Vladimirovich (Note: "Work on "Radiation genetics"")	September 20, 1900 Moscow, Russian Empire	March 28, 1981 Obninsk, Russia	1950	Nominated with M.Hartmann by B.Rajewsky the only time
	Max Hartmann (Note: "Work on compounds (gamones) promoting fertilization in vertebrates and invertebrates")	June 7, 1876 Lauterecken, German Empire	October 11, 1962 Buchenbühl, Germany	1950, 1951, 1952, 1953	
	Charles Herbert Best (Note: "Dietary factors in the protection of liver and kidney")	February 27, 1899 West Pembroke, Maine, United States	March 31, 1978 Toronto, Canada	1950, 1951, 1952, 1953	
	Edward Lawrence Rickes	August 31, 1912 New York, United States	November 1982 Rahway, New Jersey, United States	1950, 1951, 1953	Nominated jointly (Note: "Work on vitamin B 12") mainly
	Ernest Lester Smith	August 7, 1904 Teddington, England	November 6, 1992 Bradfield St George, England	1950, 1951, 1952, 1953, 1954	Nominated jointly mainly
	Jancsó Miklós (Note: "His work in the field of reticulo-endothelial pharmacology and for his achievements in the study of chemotherapeutic agents")	April 27, 1903 Kolozsvár, Austria-Hungary	April 16, 1966 Szeged, Hungary	1950, 1956	
	Carl Gustav Jung (Note: "Psychoanalysis")	July 26, 1875 Kesswil, Switzerland	June 6, 1961 Küsnacht, Switzerland	1950, 1956	Nominated for the Nobel Prize in Literature too
1951
	Daniel Bovet (Note: "Synthetic antihistamines")	March 23, 1907 Fleurier, Switzerland	April 8, 1992 Rome, Italy	1951, 1953, 1956	Won the 1957 Nobel Prize in Physiology or Medicine (Note: “for his discoveries relating to synthetic compounds that inhibit the action of certain body substances, and especially their action on the vascular system and the skeletal muscles”)
	Stanford Moore	September 4, 1913 Chicago, United States	August 23, 1982 New York, United States	1951 (Note: "Chromatographic analysis of amino acids")	Shared the 1972 Nobel Prize in Chemistry (Note: “for their contribution to the understanding of the connection between chemical structure and catalytic activity of the active centre of the ribonuclease molecule”) with Chr.B.Anfinsen Jr.
	William Howard Stein	June 25, 1911 New York, United States	February 2, 1980 New York City, United States	1951	Shared the 1972 Nobel Prize in Chemistry with Chr.B.Anfinsen Jr.
	Israel Davidsohn (Note: "Analysis of serum sickness, infectious mononucleosis and hemaglutination ")	April 20, 1895 Tarnopol, Austria-Hungary	December 3, 1979	1951	Nominated by Ellis Benjamin Freilich (1891-1971) the only time
	Alfred Auguste Roger Vendrely (Note: "Relationship between the genes and a protein in DNA")	August 15, 1910 Champagney, Haute-Saône, France	August 17, 1988 Paris, France	1951	Nominated jointly by Bożydar Szabuniewicz (1901-1986) the only time
	Miriam Friedman Menkin	August 8, 1901 Riga, Governorate of Livonia, Russian Empire	June 8, 1992 Boston, United States	1951 (Note: "Fertilization and cell division of human ova in vitro")	Nominated jointly by Bożydar Szabuniewicz (1901-1986) the only time
	John Charles Rock	March 24, 1890 Marlborough, Massachusetts, United States	December 4, 1984 Peterborough, New Hampshire, United States	1951	Nominated jointly by Bożydar Szabuniewicz (1901-1986) the only time
	Marius Nygaard Smith-Petersen (Note: "Treatment of femoral collum fractures")	November 14, 1886 Grimstad, Norway	June 16, 1953 Boston, United States	1951	Nominated by Sigmund Weil (20.4.1881 Stuttgart – 20.8.1961 Heidelberg) the only time
	Karl Gustav Vilhelm Nylin	December 18, 1892 London, England	August 6, 1961 Stockholm, Sweden	1951	Nominated jointly (Note: "Surgical treatment of isthmus aortae") with Cl.Crafoord by Niels Dungal the only time
	Remmert Korteweg (Note: "The role of extrachromosomal genetic factors in the development of breast cancer")	November 15, 1884 Wormerveer, Netherlands	1961	1951	Nominated with J.J.Bittner by N.O.J.Goormaghtigh the only time
	Walter Henry Seegers (Note: "Blood coagulation, in particular purification of prothrombin and thrombin")	January 4, 1910 Fayette County, Iowa, United States	April 19, 1996	1951	Nominated by J.M.Dorsey the only time
	Roland Metzler Klemme (Note: "Parkinsons disease and its treatment by extirpation of the premotor cortex")	May 17, 1896 Belleville, Illinois, United States	November 21, 1957 Salinas, California, United States	1951	Nominated by Eugene Towner Senseney (St. Louis: 29.8.1880 - 10.2.1954) the only time
	Arthur Felix (Note: "Typhus fever, in particular serological and bacteriological diagnosis")	April 3, 1887 Andrichau, Austria-Hungary	January 17, 1956 England	1951	Nominated by Adrianus Pijper (11.3.1886 Kimswerd - 12.1.1964 Pretoria) the only time
	Folke Henschen (Note: "Morgagni's syndrome")	November 7, 1881 Uppsala, Sweden	December 22, 1977 Stockholm, Sweden	1951	Nominated by Sherwood Moore the only time
	Fritz Verzár (Note: "The role of physphorylation in intestinal resorption and the relationship to the adrenal cortex function")	September 16, 1886 Budapest, Austria-Hungary	March 13, 1979 Arlesheim, Switzerland	1951	Nominated by Miklos Melczer (Budapest: 3.12.1891-7.3.1985) the only time
	Gustav (Gösta) Per Engelbert Häggqvist (Note: "Polyploidic frogs and mammals")	October 18, 1891 Parish of Rödön, Sweden	March 28, 1972 Danderyd Parish, Sweden	1951	
	Jacob Jongbloed (Note: "A mechanical device for heart function during cardiac surgery of malformations")	March 11, 1895 Joure, Netherlands	July 21, 1974 Utrecht, Netherlands	1951	
	Robert Berthold Janker (Note: "X-ray chinematographic image production")	March 12, 1894 Munich, German Empire	October 22, 1964 Bonn, Germany	1951	
	Bernard Naftali Halpern (Note: "Synthetic antihistamine compounds")	November 9, 1872 Tarnoruda, Austria-Hungary	August 12, 1952 Paris, France	1951	Nominated for the Nobel Prize in Chemistry too
	Richard Ernst Wilhelm Otto (Note: "Active and passive anaphylaxia and antianaphylaxia")	November 2, 1904 Zimmerhausen, German Empire	September 23, 1978 Frankfurt am Main, Germany	1951	Nominated by G.R.Blumenthal the only time
	Peter Boysen Jensen (Note: "Plant growth hormones")	January 18, 1883 Hjerting, Denmark	November 21, 1959 Diakonissestiftelsen, Denmark	1951	Nominated by Carl Larsen Krebs (2.5.1892-12.6.1979) (Note: "Co-nominator was Aage Th B Jacobsen, prof medicine, Aarhus") the only time
	Cecil Reginald ("Bill") Burch (Note: "Reflection microscopy")	May 12, 1901 Leeds or Oxford, England	July 19, 1983	1951	Nominated by Hendrik Berkelbach van der Sprenkel (21.4.1890 Breda - 6.8.1969 Bilthoven) the only time
	Henry Edward Shortt (Note: "The pre-erythrocytic stage of human malarial plasmodia")	April 15, 1887 Dhariwal, India, British Empire	November 9, 1987 United Kingdom	1951	Nominated by Alexander Kennedy (16.1.1909 London - 11.6.1960) the only time
	Madge Thurlow Macklin (Note: "The inheritance of deafness and the proband method of analysis of human pedigree for inheritance of recessive traits")	February 6, 1893 Philadelphia, United States	March 4, 1962	1951	Nominated by her husband Charles Clifford Macklin (23.10.1883-23.11.1959) the only time
	Paul Buchner	April 12, 1886 Nürnberg, German Empire	October 19, 1978 Ischia, Campania, Italy	1951, 1952	Nominated jointly (Note: "Intracellular symbiosis") only
	Umberto Pierantoni	September 25, 1876 Caserta, Kingdom of Italy	July 31, 1952 Naples, Italy	1951, 1952	Nominated jointly only
	Karel Šulc	September 3, 1872 Dvůr Králové nad Labem, Austria-Hungary	October 19, 1978 Brno, Czechia	1951, 1952	Nominated jointly only
	Joachim Wilhelm Robert Feulgen (Note: "Reactions identifying thymic acid and acetal phosphatides")	September 2, 1884 Werden, Essen, German Empire	October 24, 1955 Giessen, Germany	1951, 1952	
	James Arthur Reyniers (Note: "Germ-free animals")	April 16, 1908 Mishawaka, Indiana, United States	November 3, 1967 Tampa, Florida, United States	1951, 1954	
	Jörgen Erik Lehmann (Note: "Paraaminosalicylic acid in chemotheraphy of tuberculosis")	January 15, 1898 Copenhagen, Denmark	December 26, 1989	1951, 1952, 1955	
	Frédéric Bremer (Note: "Neurophysiology, in particular the physiological basis of electroencephalography")	June 28, 1892 Arlon, Belgium	April 7, 1982 Brussels, Belgium	1951, 1952, 1953, 1956	
	Richard Wagner (Note: "Sensory physiology, muscle innervation, and mechanics of pulmonary circulation")	October 23, 1893 Augsburg, German Empire	December 19, 1970 Munich, Germany	1951, 1952, 1956	
	Axel Edvard Westman (Note: "Neurohumoral regulation of female sexual functions and tubal egg transport")	December 29, 1894 Stockholm, Sweden	May 29, 1960 Stockholm, Sweden	1951, 1956	
	Karl Paul Gerhard Link (Note: "Dicoumarol and related compounds")	January 31, 1901 LaPorte, Indiana, United States	November 21, 1978 Madison, Wisconsin, United States	1951, 1952	Nominated for the Nobel Prize in Chemistry too
1952
	Johan Erik Jorpes	July 15, 1894 Kökar, Grand Duchy of Finland, Russian Empire	July 10, 1973 Stockholm, Sweden	1952	Nominated with K.P.G.Link only
	John Franklin Enders	February 10, 1897 West Hartford, Connecticut, United States	September 8, 1985 Waterford, Connecticut, United States	1952, 1953, 1954	Shared the 1954 Nobel Prize in Physiology or Medicine with Th.H.Weller and Fr.Ch.Robbins (Note: “for their discovery of the ability of poliomyelitis viruses to grow in cultures of various types of tissue”)
	Ulf Svante von Euler	February 7, 1905 Stockholm, Sweden	March 9, 1983 Stockholm, Sweden	1952, 1954, 1955, 1956	Shared the 1970 Nobel Prize in Physiology or Medicine with B.Katz and J.Axelrod (Note: “for their discoveries concerning the humoral transmitters in the nerve terminals and the mechanism for their storage, release and inactivation”)
	Melvin Ellis Calvin	April 8, 1911 St. Paul, Minnesota, United States	January 8, 1997 Berkeley, California, United States	1952	Won the 1961 Nobel Prize in Chemistry (Note: “for his research on the carbon dioxide assimilation in plants”)
	Andrew Alm Benson	September 24, 1917 Modesto, California, United States	January 16, 2015 La Jolla, United States	1952	Nominated with M.Ell.Calvin only including for the Nobel Prize in Chemistry too
	James Lawder Gamble	July 18, 1883 Millersburg, Kentucky, United States	May 28, 1959	1952	Nominated by Öd.Kerpel-Fronius the only time
	Robert Brinkman	June 27, 1894 Coevorden, Netherlands	January 26, 1994 Velp, Gelderland, Netherlands	1952	Nominated by Leendert Daniel Eerland (25.2.1897 Rotterdam - 29.6.1977 Groningen) the only time
	Albert Hustin	July 15, 1882 Virton, Belgium	September 12, 1967 Brussels, Belgium	1952	Nominated by Maurice De Laet (1891-1964) the only time
	Charles Oberling	July 31, 1895 Metz, France	March 11, 1960 Neuilly-sur-Seine, France	1952	Nominated by M.Josserand the only time
	Viktor Freiherr von Weizsäcker	April 21, 1886 Stuttgart, German Empire	January 9, 1957 Heidelberg, Germany	1952	Nominated by Ramón A. Brandán (1890-1969) the only time
	Owen Harding Wangensteen	September 21, 1898 Lake Park, Minnesota, United States	January 13, 1981 Minneapolis, Minnesota, United States	1952	Nominated by M.B.Visscher the only time
	Erich Frank	June 28, 1884 Berlin, German Empire	February 13, 1957 Istanbul, Turkey	1952	Nominated by Ed.O.Melchior the only time
	Arturo Rosenblueth Stearns	October 2, 1900 Ciudad Guerrero, Mexico	September 20, 1970 Mexico City, Mexico	1952	Nominated by Ign.G.Guzmán the only time
	Thomas Francis Dougherty	March 27, 1915 Forman, North Dakota, United States	February 5, 1974 Salt Lake City, United States	1952	Nominated by Edwin Alonzo Lawrence (22.5.1910 Norwalk - 1956) the only time
	Hans Karl Heinrich Adolf Lohmann	April 10, 1898 Bielefeld, German Empire	April 22, 1978 Berlin, Germany	1952	
	Hugo Wilhelm Knipping	July 9, 1895 Dortmund, German Empire	December 25, 1984 Bonn, Germany	1952	Nominated by Fr.Külbs the only time
	Karl Kleist	January 31, 1879 Mulhouse, Alsace, German Empire	December 26, 1960 Frankfurt am Main, Germany	1952	Nominated with O.Vogt by Ant.C. de A.F.Egas Moniz the only time
	Elizabeth Bugie Gregory	October 5, 1920	April 10, 2001	1952	Nominated with S.Abr.Waksman and J.Er.Lehmann by J.Nedeljković (Јеврем Недељковић, 1888-1977) the only time
	Albert Israel Schatz	February 2, 1920 Norwich, Connecticut, United States	January 17, 2005 Philadelphia, United States	1952	Nominated with S.Abr.Waksman and J.Er.Lehmann by J.Nedeljković (Јеврем Недељковић, 1888-1977) the only time
	David Nachmansohn	March 17, 1899 Yekaterinoslav, Yekaterinoslav Governorate, Russian Empire	November 2, 1983 New York, United States	1952	Nominated for the Nobel Prize in Chemistry too
	Toshiyuki Kurotsu	November 12, 1898 Kyoto Prefecture, Japan	November 16, 1992	1952	Nominated by N.Yoshii the only time
	Paul Hoffmann	July 1, 1884 Dorpat, Estonia, Russian Empire	March 9, 1962 Freiburg im Breisgau, Germany	1952, 1953	
	Werner Theodor Otto Forßmann	August 29, 1904 Berlin, German Empire	June 1, 1979 Schopfheim, Germany	1952, 1953, 1955, 1956	Shared the 1956 Nobel Prize in Physiology or Medicine with D.W.Richards Jr. (Note: “for their discoveries concerning heart catheterization and pathological changes in the circulatory system”)
1953					Shared the 1956 Nobel Prize in Physiology or Medicine with D.W.Richards Jr.
	André Frédéric Cournand	September 24, 1895 Paris, France	February 19, 1988 Great Barrington, Massachusetts, United States	1953, 1954, 1955, 1956	Shared the 1956 Nobel Prize in Physiology or Medicine with D.W.Richards Jr.
	John Carew Eccles	January 27, 1903 Melbourne, Australia	May 2, 1997 Tenero-Contra, Switzerland	1953, 1954, 1955, 1956	Shared the 1963 Nobel Prize in Physiology or Medicine with A.F.Huxley (Note: “for their discoveries concerning the ionic mechanisms involved in excitation and inhibition in the peripheral and central portions of the nerve cell membrane”)
	Alan Lloyd Hodgkin	February 5, 1914 Banbury, England	December 20, 1998 Cambridge, England	1953, 1954, 1955	Shared the 1963 Nobel Prize in Physiology or Medicine with A.F.Huxley
	Feodor Felix Konrad Lynen	April 6, 1911 Munich, German Empire	August 6, 1979 Munich, Germany	1953, 1955, 1956	Shared the 1964 Nobel Prize in Physiology or Medicine with K.Em.Bloch (Note: “for their discoveries concerning the mechanism and regulation of the cholesterol and fatty acid metabolism”) and nominated for Nobel Peace in Chemistry too
	Konrad Zacharias Lorenz	November 7, 1903 Vienna, Austria-Hungary	February 27, 1989 Vienna, Austria	1953	Shared the 1973 Nobel Prize in Physiology or Medicine with K.R. von Frisch and N. "Niko" Tinbergen (Note: “for their discoveries concerning organization and elicitation of individual and social behaviour patterns”)
	Linus Carl Pauling	February 28, 1901 Portland, Oregon, United States	August 19, 1994 Big Sur, United States	1953	Won the 1954 Nobel Prize in Chemistry (Note: “for his research into the nature of the chemical bond and its application to the elucidation of the structure of complex substances”) and the 1962 Nobel Peace Prize (Note: “for his fight against the nuclear arms race between East and West”)
	Frederick Sanger	August 13, 1918 Rendcomb, United Kingdom	November 19, 2013 Cambridge, England	1953, 1955, 1956	Won the 1958 (Note: “for his work on the structure of proteins, especially that of insulin”) and shared the 1980 (with P.Berg and jointly (Note: “for their contributions concerning the determination of base sequences in nucleic acids”) with W.Gilbert) Nobel Prizes in Chemistry
	Paul Arnor Owren	August 27, 1905 Fåberg, Norway	September 20, 1985 Oslo, Norway	1953	Nominated by C.B.Semb the only time
	Leopold Schönbauer	November 13, 1888 Thaya, Austria-Hungary	September 11, 1963 Vienna, Austria	1953	Nominated by Fritz Driak (14.2.1900-27.11.1959) the only time
	Emil von Dungern	November 26, 1867 Thaya, Austria-Hungary	September 4, 1961 Ludwigshafen am Bodensee, Germany	1953	Nominated jointly by Ludwik Hirszfeld the only time
	Ronald Aylmer Fisher	February 17, 1890 London, United Kingdom	July 29, 1962 Adelaide, Australia	1953	Nominated jointly by Ludwik Hirszfeld the only time
	Étienne Wolff	February 12, 1904 Auxerre, France	November 18, 1996 Paris, France	1953	Nominated by Etienne Legait (1.4.1911-28.5.2005) the only time
	Adolf Jarisch jr.	February 23, 1891 Innsbruck, Austria-Hungary	August 31, 1965 Innsbruck, Austria	1953	Nominated by Fr.Th. von Brücke the only time
	Walther Frederick Goebel	December 24, 1899 Palo Alto, California, United States	November 1, 1993 Essex, Connecticut, United States	1953	Nominated with Osw.Th.Avery Jr. and M.J. Heidelberger by Ar.L.Olitzki the only time
	Richard Joseph Behan	June 1, 1879 Pittsburgh, United States	1956	1953	Nominated by J.L.Losas the only time
	Joseph Gillman	December 3, 1907 Pretoria, British Empire	September 5, 1981 Nice, France	1953	Jointly nominated only
	Theodore Gillman	c. 1917 Union of South Africa	July 12, 1971 Durban, South Africa	1953	Jointly nominated only
	Henry Ernest Sigerist	April 7, 1891 Paris, France	March 17, 1957 Pura, Switzerland	1953	Nominated by C.Enr.Paz Soldán y Paz Soldán the only time
	Zénon-Marcel Bacq	December 31, 1903 La Louvière, Belgium	July 12, 1983 Fontenoy, Belgium	1953	Nominated by Henri Robert Antoine Fredericq (Liège: 11.6.1887-11.12.1980) the only time
	Friedrich Feyrter	June 2, 1895 Vienna, Austria-Hungary	December 2, 1973 Bad Fischau-Brunn, Austria	1953	Nominated with T.Osk.Caspersson by Viktor Patzelt (8.7.1887 Prague – 17.9.1956) the only time
	Alfred Pischinger	1899	1982	1953	Nominated with T.Osk.Caspersson by Viktor Patzelt (8.7.1887 Prague – 17.9.1956) the only time
	David Rittenberg	November 11, 1906 New York, United States	January 24, 1970 New York City, United States	1953	Nominated for the Nobel Prize in Chemistry too
	William Thomas Astbury	February 25, 1898 Longton, United Kingdom	June 4, 1961 Leeds, England	1953	Nominated by Alb.I.Szent-Györgyi the only time
	Léon Binet	October 11, 1891 Beauchery-Saint-Martin, France	July 10, 1971 Paris, France	1953	Nominated by Spiro Livierato (15.4.1881 Cephalonia - 1962) the only time
	Alexander Haddow	January 18, 1907 Leven, Fife, United Kingdom	January 21, 1976 Amersham, United Kingdom	1953	
	Robert M. Debré	December 7, 1882 Sedan, France	April 29, 1978 Le Kremlin-Bicêtre, France	1953	Nominated for the Nobel Peace Prize too
	Robert Brainard Corey	August 19, 1897 Springfield, Massachusetts, United States	April 23, 1971	1953	Nominated for the Nobel Prize in Chemistry too
	Katsunuma Seizō	August 28, 1886 Shizuoka Prefecture, Japan	November 9, 1963 Nagoya, Japan	1953	Nominated by Naka Kikkawa (4.1888 Shizuoka - ?) the only time
	Edmond-Louis Grasset	September 29, 1895 Geneva, Switzerland	October 30, 1957 Geneva, Switzerland	1953	Nominated by J.M.Watt the only time
	António de Sousa Pereira	April 14, 1904 Bustelo, Portugal	October 19, 1986 Nevogilde, Portugal	1953	Nominated by Antonio de Almeida Garrett (Porto: 22.9.1884 - 19.11.1961) the only time
	Gilbert Dalldorf	March 12, 1900 Davenport, Iowa, United States	December 21, 1979	1953	Nominated with T.Osk.Caspersson by W.Keller the only time
	Robert Russell Bensley	November 13, 1867 Hamilton, Ontario, Canada	June 11, 1956 Chicago, United States	1953	Nominated by Normand Louis Hoerr (3.5.1902 Peoria - 14.2.1958 Cleveland) the only time
	Paul Valentin Alfred Delmas-Marsalet	August 4, 1898 Dax, Landes, France	July 2, 1977 Léognan, France	1953	Nominated by Jean Michon the only time
	Herbert Henri Jasper	July 27, 1906 La Grande, Oregon, United States	March 11, 1999	1953	Nominated with W.Gr.Penfield by Jorge Alejandro Voto Bernales Corpancho (22.10.1911 Lima - 19.9.2008) the only time
	Wilder Graves Penfield	January 26, 1891 Spokane, Washington, United States	April 5, 1976 Montreal, Canada	1953, 1954, 1955	
	Alessandro Vallebona	March 2, 1899 Genoa, Kingdom of Italy	December 1, 1987 Genoa, Italy	1953, 1955	
	John Davis Green	July 27, 1917 Guildford, United Kingdom	December 10, 1964 Los Angeles, United States	1953	Nominated jointly with J.H.B."Hans" Selye and G.W.Harris by C.-Er.Em. Räihä the only time
	Geoffrey Wingfield Harris	1913 United Kingdom	November 29, 1971 United Kingdom	1953, 1956	
	Alfred Richard Wilhelm Kühn	April 22, 1885 Baden-Baden, German Empire	November 22, 1968 Tübingen, Germany	1953	Nominated jointly with Th.Gr.Dobzhansky by Felix Mainx (21.5.1900 Prague – 1983 Vienna) the only time
	Dobzhansky, Theodosius Grigorievich	January 25, 1900 Nemirov, Russian Empire	December 18, 1975 Davis, California, United States	1953, 1956	
	Ludwig Heilmeyer	March 6, 1899 Munich, German Empire	September 6, 1969 Desenzano del Garda, Italy	1953, 1955, 1956	
	Carl John Wiggers	May 28, 1883 Davenport, Iowa, United States	April 28, 1963 Cleveland, United States	1953, 1956	Nominated by C.J.Fr.Heymans only
1954
	Frederick Chapman Robbins	August 25, 1916 Auburn, Alabama, United States	August 4, 2003 Cleveland, Ohio, United States	1954	Shared the 1954 Nobel Prize in Physiology or Medicine with J.Fr.Enders
	Thomas Huckle Weller	June 15, 1915 Ann Arbor, Michigan, United States	August 23, 2008 Needham, Massachusetts, United States	1954	Shared the 1954 Nobel Prize in Physiology or Medicine with J.Fr.Enders
	Dickinson Woodruff Richards Jr.	October 30, 1895 Orange, New Jersey, United States	February 23, 1973 Lakeville, Connecticut, United States	1954, 1955, 1956	Shared the 1956 Nobel Prize in Physiology or Medicine with A.Fr.Cournand and W.Th.O. Forßmann
	George de Hevesy	August 1, 1885; Budapest, Hungary	July 5, 1966; Freiburg im Breisgau, Germany	1954, 1956	Won the 1943 Nobel Prize in Chemistry (Note: “for his work on the use of isotopes as tracers in the study of chemical processes”) in 1944
	David Bodian	May 15, 1910 St. Louis, Missouri, United States	September 18, 1992 Baltimore, Maryland, United States	1954	
	Vito Maria Buscaino	December 1, 1887 Trapani, Italy	April 29, 1978 Napoli, Italy	1954	
	Philip Drinker	December 12, 1894 Haverford, Pennsylvania, United States	October 19, 1972 Fitzwilliam, New Hampshire, United States	1954	
	Francesc Duran i Reynals	December 5, 1899 Barcelona, Spain	March 27, 1958 New Haven, Connecticut, United States	1954	
	Wilhelm Siegmund Feldberg	November 19, 1900 Hamburg, Germany	October 23, 1993 London, United Kingdom	1954	
	Herman Salomon Frenkel	August 18, 1891 Utrecht, Netherlands	August 3, 1968 Amsterdam, Netherlands	1954	
	John Farquhar Fulton	November 1, 1899 Saint Paul, Minnesota, United States	May 29, 1960 Hamden, Connecticut, United States	1954	
	Antoine Victor Léon Giroud	December 26, 1895 Moulins, Allier, France	February 25, 1978 Chemilly, Allier, France	1954	
	George Keble Hirst	March 2, 1909 Eau Claire, Wisconsin, United States	January 22, 1994 Palo Alto, California, United States	1954	
	Dorothy Millicent Horstmann	July 2, 1911 Spokane, Washington, United States	January 11, 2001 New Haven, Connecticut, United States	1954	
	Jean Judet	August 28 (or 31), 1905 Paris, France	March 11 (or 12), 1995 Paris, France	1954	
	Robert Judet	September 17, 1909 Paris, France	December 20, 1980 Paris, France	1954	
	Lars Leksell	November 24, 1907 Fässberg, Sweden	January 12, 1986 Swiss_Alps, Switzerland	1954	
	Colin Munro MacLeod	January 28, 1909 Port Hastings, Nova Scotia, Canada	February 11, 1972 London, England	1954	Nominated jointly with Osw.Th.Avery Jr.
	Maclyn McCarty	June 9, 1911 South Bend, Indiana, United States	January 2, 2005 New York City, United States	1954	Nominated jointly with Osw.Th.Avery Jr.
	Francisco Mas Magro	1879 Crevillent, Spain	December 26, 1958 Alicante, Spain	1954	
	Matsubara Masako			1954	
	Gilbert Horton Mudge, Jr	April 1915	October 28, 1996	1954	
	Alan Sterling Parkes	September 10, 1900	July 17, 1990	1954	
	Anne-Marie Staub	November 13, 1914 Pont-Audemer, France	December 30, 2012 Saint-Germain-en-Laye, France	1954	
	Leonell C. Strong	January 19, 1894	August 31, 1982 La Jolla, San Diego, California, United States	1954	
	Wallace Osgood Fenn	April 27, 1893 Lanesborough, Massachusetts, United States	September 20, 1971 Rochester, New York, United States	1954, 1955	
	Thérèse Tréfouël	June 19, 1892; Paris, France	November 9, 1978; Paris, France	1954, 1955	Nominated jointly with J.Tréfouël only
	Karl Heinrich Bauer	September 26, 1890 Schwärzdorf, Upper Franconia, Germany	July 7, 1978 Heidelberg, Germany	1954, 1956	
	Russell Claude Brock, Baron Brock	October 24, 1903 London, United Kingdom	September 3, 1980 London, United Kingdom	1954, 1955, 1956	
	Furuhata Tanemoto	June 15, 1891 Mie Prefecture, Japan	May 6, 1975 Tokyo, Japan	1954, 1956	
	Henri Laborit	November 21, 1914 Hanoi, French Indochina	May 18, 1995 Paris, France	1954, 1956	
	Horace Winchell Magoun	June 23, 1907 Philadelphia, United States	March 6, 1991 Santa Monica, California, United States	1954, 1956	
	Carl Martius	March 1, 1906 Striegau, Schlesien (then Germany)	April 10, 1993 Meilen, Zürich, Switzerland	1954, 1956	
1955
	Severo Ochoa de Albornoz	September 24, 1905; Luarca, Spain	November 1, 1993; Madrid, Spain	1955, 1956	Shared the 1959 Nobel Prize in Physiology or Medicine with A.Kornberg and nominated for the Nobel Prize in Chemistry too
	Sir Andrew Fielding Huxley	November 22, 1917 Hampstead, London, England	May 30, 2012 Cambridge, England	1955	Shared the 1963 Nobel Prize in Physiology or Medicine with J.C.Eccles and Al.Ll.Hodgkin
	George Wald	November 18, 1906 New York City, United States	April 12, 1997 Cambridge, Massachusetts, United States	1955, 1956	Shared the 1967 Nobel Prize in Physiology or Medicine with H.K.Hartline and R.A.Granit (Note: “for their discoveries concerning the primary physiological and chemical visual processes in the eye”) and nominated for the Nobel Prize in Chemistry too
	Max Ludwig Henning Delbrück	September 4, 1906 Berlin, German Empire	March 9, 1981 Pasadena, California, United States	1955	Delbrück nominated for the Nobel Prize in Physics too Shared the 1969 Nobel Prize in Physiology or Medicine (Note: "for their discoveries concerning the replication mechanism and the genetic structure of viruses") Hershey nominated for the Nobel Prize in Chemistry too
	Alfred Day Hershey	December 4, 1908 Owosso, Michigan, United States	May 22, 1997 Syosset, New York, United States	1955	Delbrück nominated for the Nobel Prize in Physics too Shared the 1969 Nobel Prize in Physiology or Medicine Hershey nominated for the Nobel Prize in Chemistry too
	Salvador Edward Luria	August 13, 1912 Turin, Kingdom of Italy	February 6, 1991 Lexington, Massachusetts, United States	1955	Delbrück nominated for the Nobel Prize in Physics too Shared the 1969 Nobel Prize in Physiology or Medicine Hershey nominated for the Nobel Prize in Chemistry too
	Ludwig Friedrich Alfred Adam	August 13, 1888 Müncheberg, Germany	September 19, 1956 Erlangen, Germany	1955	
	Basu Kumar Bagchi	January 7, 1895 Shantipur, India	August 28, 1977 Ann Arbor, Michigan, United States	1955	
	Wolfgang Friedrich Wilhelm Bargmann (at birth Bardel)	January 27, 1906 Nürnberg, Germany	June 20, 1978 Kiel, Germany	1955	
	Gaetano Boschi	May 19, 1882 Padova, Italy	March 19, 1969 Bologna, Italy	1955	
	Alf Brodal	January 25, 1910 Kristiania, Norway	February 29, 1988 Bærum, Norway	1955	
	Gladys Cameron	1895		1955	Nominated jointly with H.Goldblatt the only time by P.H.Müller
	Seymour Stanley Cohen	April 30, 1917 Brooklyn, New York, United States	December 30, 2018 Woods Hole, Massachusetts, United States	1955	Nominated for Nobel Prize in Chemistry too
	Marie Jules Constant Robert Courrier	October 6, 1895 Saxon-Sion, France	March 13, 1986 Paris, France	1955	Nominated by G.Katsch the only time
	Daniel Danielopolu	April 12, 1884 Bucharest, Kingdom of Romania	April 29, 1955 Bucharest, Romanian People's Republic	1955	Nominated by D.P.Orachowatz the only time
	Louis-Paul Dugal	1911	January 7, 2000	1955	Nominated by Ch.Ph.Leblond the only time
	Fabien Gagnon	January 21, 1898 Saint-François-de-Beauce, Quebec, Canada	June 11, 1957 Quebec, Canada	1955	Nominated by Florian Trempe (1899-1994) from Quebec the only time
	Johannes Heimbeck	May 30, 1892 Kristiania, Norway	September 24, 1976 New Haven, Connecticut, United States	1955	
	Friedrich Holtz	Oktober 6, 1889 Mölln, Germany	June 18, 1967 Friedrichsdorf, Germany	1955	Nominated by Al.Meesmann the only time
	Davenport Hooker	May 13, 1887 Brooklyn, New York, United States	June 27, 1965 New Haven, Connecticut, United States	1955	Nominated by El.C.Crosby the only time
	Jan Birger Jansen	September 25, 1898 Horten, Norway	November 24, 1984 Oslo, Norway	1955	
	Elvin Abraham Kabat	September 1, 1914 Manhattan, New York, United States	June 16, 2000 North Falmouth, Massachusetts, United States	1955	Nominated jointly with M.Heidelberger by A.Wolf the only time
	Gerhardt Katsch	May 14, 1887 Berlin, Germany	March 7, 1961 Greifswald, East Germany)	1955	Nominated by Bruno Karitzky (1907-1978) from Rostock the only time
	Honoré-Julien-Charles Lams	April 10, 1883 Brugge, Belgium	April 8, 1978 Drongen, Belgium	1955	Nominated by Marcel Sebruyns (1912-1985) from Ghent the only time
	Kōichi Motokawa	January 17, 1903 Ishikawa Prefecture, Japan	February 3, 1971 Sendai, Japan	1955	
	Richard Prigge	April 17, 1896 Frankfurt am Main, Germany	January 30, 1967 Frankfurt am Main, Germany	1955	
	Heráclides César de Souza Araújo	June 24, 1886 Imbituva, Paraná, Brazil	August 10, 1962 Rio de Janeiro, Brazil	1955	
	William Smith Tillett	July 10, 1892 Charlotte, North Carolina, United States	April 4, 1974	1955	
	Bernard George Ziedses des Plantes	January 7, 1902 Klundert, Netherlands	July 21, 1993 Bloemendaal, Netherlands	1955	
	Clarence Walton Lillehei	October 23, 1918 Minneapolis, Minnesota, United States	July 5, 1999 Saint Paul, Minnesota, United States	1955	
	Morley Cohen	November 18, 1923 Winnipeg, Manitoba, Canada	August 18, 2005 Winnipeg, Manitoba, Canada	1955	Nominated jointly (Note: "pioneering developments in open-heart surgery, including a technique for blood supply called Crossed Circulation") with Cl.W.Lillehei the only time by John Edwin Scarff (1898-1978)
	Richard Lynn Varco	August 14, 1912 Fairview, Montana, United States	May 3, 2004 Halfmoon Bay, British Columbia, Canada	1955	Nominated jointly with Cl.W.Lillehei the only time by John Edwin Scarff (1898-1978)
	Herbert E. Warden	1920 Cleveland, Ohio, United States	January 14, 2002 Morgantown, West Virginia, United States	1955	Nominated jointly with Cl.W.Lillehei the only time by John Edwin Scarff (1898-1978)
	Fuller Albright	January 12, 1900 Buffalo, New York, United States	December 8, 1969 Boston, Massachusetts, United States	1955, 1956	
	Jean Louis Auguste Brachet	March 19, 1909 Etterbeek, Belgium	August 10, 1988 Braine-l'Alleud, Belgium	1955, 1956	Nominated for Nobel Prize in Chemistry too
	Jonas Edward Salk	October 28, 1914 New York City, United States	June 23, 1995 La Jolla, San Diego, California, United States	1955, 1956	
	Hans Hermann Julius Wilhelm Weber	June 17, 1896 Berlin, Germany	June 12, 1974 Heidelberg, Germany	1955, 1956	
	Tomizo Yoshida	February 10, 1903 Asakawa, Fukushima, Japan	April 27, 1973	1955, 1956	
1956
	Alexander Robertus Todd, Baron Todd	October 2, 1907 Cathcart, Scotland	January 10, 1997 Oakington, England	1956	Won the 1967 Nobel Prize in Chemistry (Note: “for his work on nucleotides and nucleotide co-enzymes”)
	Luis Federico Leloir	September 6, 1906 Paris, France	December 2, 1987 Buenos Aires, Argentina	1956	Won the 1970 Nobel Prize in Chemistry (Note: “for his discovery of sugar nucleotides and their role in the biosynthesis of carbohydrates”)
	Giuseppe Amantea	March 24, 1885 Grimaldi, Calabria, Italy	September 6, 1966 Rome, Italy	1956	
	Norman Henry Ashton	11 September 1913 London, England	4 January 2000 London, England	1956	Nominated by Frederick Allison Davis (1883-1970) from Madison the only time
	Charles Philamore Bailey	September 8, 1910 Wanamassa, New Jersey, United States	August 18, 1993 Marietta, Georgia, United States	1956	Nominated by Magojirō Maekawa (1902-1971) from Kyoto the only time
	Dwight Emary Harken	June 5, 1910 Osceola, Iowa, United States	August 27, 1993 Cambridge, Massachusetts, United States	1956	Nominated by Magojirō Maekawa (1902-1971) from Kyoto the only time
	Percival Sylvester Bailey	May 9, 1892 Mount Vernon, Illinois, United States	August 10, 1973 Evanston, Illinois, United States	1956	Nominated by Burghard Breitner (1884-1956) from Innsbruck the only time
	Guillermo Andrés Bosco	June 3, 1886 Dolores, Buenos Aires, Argentina	August 20, 1971 Buenos Aires, Argentina	1956	Nominated by Orestes Eduardo Adorni (1892-1958) from Buenos Aires the only time
	Fernando de Castro Rodríguez	February 25, 1896 Madrid, Spain	April 15, 1967 Madrid, Spain	1956	
	Kurt Arthur Alfred Oskar Felix	June 3, 1888 Würzburg, Germany	August 2, 1960 Frankfurt am Main, Germany	1956	Nominated by O.Gans the only time
	Ivan Đaja	July 21, 1884 Le Havre, France	October 1, 1957 Belgrade, Serbia	1956	Nominated by B. de Rudder the only time
	Giovanni Di Guglielmo	September 22, 1886 São Paulo, Brazil	February 19, 1961 Rome, Italy	1956	Nominated by C.A.Decio (1885-1957) the only time
	Ernst Klenk	October 14, 1896 Pfalzgrafenweiler, Germany	December 29, 1971 Cologne, Germany	1956	Nominated for the Nobel Prize in Chemistry too
	Gerhard Bruno Gustav Küntscher	December 6, 1900 Zwickau, Germany	December 17, 1972 Glücksburg, Germany	1956	
	Rebecca Craighill Lancefield	January 5, 1895 Fort Wadsworth, New York, United States	March 3, 1981 Douglaston, Queens, New York, United States	1956	Nominated by Charles V. Seastone (~1897 - 1974) from Madison the only time
	Gregorio Marañón y Posadillo	19 May 1887 Madrid, Spain	27 March 1960 Madrid, Spain	1956	Nominated by Emilio Gil Vernet (1905-1970) the only time
	Joseph Eldridge Markee	May 22, 1903 Neponset, Illinois, United States	November 27, 1970	1956	Nominated by Balthazar Simon ten Berge (1896-1974) from Groningen the only time
	Ogata Tomosaburō	January 31, 1883 Tokyo, Japan	August 25, 1973	1956	Nominated by A.Kimara from Kyoto the only time
	William Councilman Owens	1917	2006	1956	Nominated by Frederick Allison Davis (1883-1970) from Madison the only time
	Ella Uhler Owens	1914	1999	1956	Nominated by Frederick Allison Davis (1883-1970) from Madison the only time
	Arnall Patz	June 14, 1920 Elberton, Georgia, United States	March 11, 2010 Pikesville, Maryland, United States	1956	Nominated by Frederick Allison Davis (1883-1970) from Madison the only time
	Theodore Thomas Puck	September 24, 1916 Chicago, United States	November 6, 2005 Denver, United States	1956	Nominated by Gordon Meiklejohn (1911-1997) from Denver the only time
	Gilberto Rossi	9 January 1877 Città di Castello, Italy	20 March 1960 Florence, Italy	1956	Nominated by Igino Spadolini (1887-1966) from Florence the only time
	Robert Schröder	August 3, 1884 Rostock, Germany	Oktober 13, 1959 Leipzig, Germany	1956	Nominated by Victor Conill from Barcelona the only time
	Frank L. Soler	June 12, 1882 Paraná, Entre Ríos, Argentina	1971 or 1973	1956	
	Philipp Stöhr, Jr.	April 2, 1891 Würzburg, Germany	January 22, 1979 Bonn, Germany	1956	Nominated by K.Fr.Bauer the only time
	Jacob Earl Thomas	1891	1972	1956	Nominated by J.Kaulbersz the only time
	Karl Albert Ferdinand Thomas	November 28, 1883 Freiburg im Breisgau, Germany	September 6, 1969 Göttingen, Germany	1956	Nominated by C.M.Hasselmann the only time
	Jan Gösta Waldenström	April 17, 1906 Stockholm, Sweden	December 1, 1996 Malmö, Sweden	1956	Nominated by Ot.H.Warburg the only time
1957
1958
1959
