= Binet =

Binet is a surname of French origin, shared by the following people:

- Alfred Binet (1857–1911), French psychologist, co-inventor of the first usable intelligence test
- Ana Binet (born 1992), Dominican volleyball player
- Charles Binet (1869–1936), French Catholic archbishop and cardinal
- Charles Binet-Sanglé (1868–1941), French military doctor and psychologist
- Chris Binet (born 1937), Belgian former sports shooter
- Émile Binet (1908–1958), Belgian athlete
- Erwann Binet (born 1972), French politician
- Etienne Binet (1569–1639), French Jesuit author
- François Binet (1880–1930), French politician
- Gérard Binet (born 1955), Canadian politician
- Hélène Binet (born 1959), Swiss-French architectural photographer
- Jacques Binet (1786–1856), French mathematician
- Jean-Auguste-Gustave Binet (1875–1940), also known as Binet-Valmer, Franco-Swiss novelist and journalist
- Jocelyne Binet (1923–1968), Canadian pianist, composer and music teacher
- Juliette Binet (born 1984), French author and illustrator
- Laurent Binet (born 1972), French writer and university lecturer
- Léon Binet (1891–1971), French physician
- Louis Binet (1744–1800), French painter, draughtsman, illustrator, and engraver
- René Binet (translator) (1732–1812), French translator
- René Binet (architect) (1866–1911), French architect
- René Binet (neo-Fascist) (1913–1957), French political activist
- Sophie Binet (born 1982), French trade unionist

== See also ==
- BiNet USA (Bisexual Network of the USA)
- Stanford–Binet Intelligence Scales, partially named after Alfred Binet
- Binet's formula for the Fibonacci sequence, named after Jacques Binet
- Cauchy–Binet formula of linear algebra, partially named after Jacques Binet
- Banet, another surname
