= Oskar Wintersteiner =

Austrian-born biochemist (1898–1971)

- Born: Oskar Paul Wintersteiner; November 15, 1898; Bruck an der Mur, Austria
- Died: August 15, 1971 (aged 72); Graz, Austria
- Education: University of Graz
- Known for: Research on progesterone, penicillin, and curare alkaloids
- Awards: Citation of Merit from President Harry S. Truman; William H. Nichols Medal (1950)
- Scientific career
- Fields: Biochemistry, organic chemistry
- Institutions: University of Graz; Columbia University; Squibb Institute for Medical Research; Rutgers University

Oskar Paul Wintersteiner (November 15, 1898 – August 15, 1971) was an Austrian-born biochemist and organic chemist who spent most of his career in the United States, mainly at Columbia University and the Squibb Institute for Medical Research. His research focused on the chemistry and purification of hormones, antibiotics, and plant alkaloids.

With Willard M. Allen, Wintersteiner isolated crystalline progestin fractions from rabbit corpus luteum, including a compound later identified as progesterone. With J. D. Dutcher, he isolated crystalline d-tubocurarine from curare prepared from Chondrodendron tomentosum, establishing its botanical source in certain curare preparations. His work on penicillin during World War II led to the award of a Citation of Merit from President Harry S. Truman. Wintersteiner received the William H. Nichols Medal and was elected to the National Academy of Sciences in 1950.

== Early life and education ==
Wintersteiner was born November 15, 1898, in Bruck an der Mur, Austria. He received a doctorate in chemistry from the University of Graz in 1921, where he worked with Nobel Prize–winning chemist Fritz Pregl. He stayed at Graz as an instructor in medical chemistry and organic microanalysis until 1926. In 1926, he received an International Education Board fellowship to work at Johns Hopkins University and the Rockefeller Institute; at Johns Hopkins, he worked with John Jacob Abel; he subsequently spent a year with P. A. Levene at the Rockefeller Institute.

Wintersteiner was appointed as an assistant professor of chemistry at Columbia University in 1929, and he taught biochemistry at Columbia’s College of Physicians and Surgeons from 1929 to 1941. He joined the Squibb Institute for Medical Research in 1941 as the director of its Division of Organic Chemistry. Beginning in 1942, he was an honorary professor of biochemistry at Rutgers University.

== Research ==
=== Insulin ===
During Wintersteiner's time at Johns Hopkins in Abel’s laboratory, he worked with Vincent du Vigneaud (a postdoc there at the time) on the chemical composition of insulin preparations. Their work showed that hormonally active crystalline insulin preparations contained amino acids, rather than a separate low molecular weight organic compound, providing evidence for the protein nature of insulin.

=== Progesterone and steroid hormones ===
Together with Willard M. Allen, Wintersteiner fractionated extracts from rabbit corpus luteum (the endocrine structure in the ovaries) by fractional crystallization. They separated the biologically active hormone from the much larger quantity of inactive material; they designated two active crystalline fractions as compounds B and C and these showed progestational activity. Their compound B was subsequently identified as the substance now called progesterone. Compound C was interpreted as either another progestin or an alternative crystalline form of progesterone.

=== Adrenalcortical hormones ===
Wintersteiner also worked on the isolation and characterization of hormones from the adrenal cortex. The presentation speech for the 1950 Nobel Prize in Physiology or Medicine identified Wintersteiner and Joseph J. Pfiffner as having made important contributions to the isolation of adrenal cortical substances.

Wintersteiner and Pfiffner were among the researchers who isolated Compound E, later known as cortisone. In animal tests, they found that the compound had little or no ability to prolong survival after removal of the adrenal glands, although later work showed that it strongly affected muscular performance, and thus Wintersteiner and Pfiffner missed the primary biological activity of the compound.

=== Penicillin and other antibiotics ===
At Squibb during World War II, Wintersteiner worked on projects related to national needs and the war effort. He purified penicillin and, through microanalysis, showed that it contained sulfur. Wintersteiner received a Citation of Merit from President Truman for this wartime work on the chemistry of penicillin. In 1949, The New York Times reported that he was awarded the Nichols Medal in recognition of fundamental contributions to insulin chemistry, steroid hormones, antibiotics, and alkaloids, including the first crystalline isolation of penicillin G and streptomycin.

=== Curare alkaloids ===
In 1943, Wintersteiner and J. D. Dutcher, then working at the Squibb Institute for Medical Research, isolated d-tubocurarine from curare prepared from the identified species Chondrodendron tomentosum. Their method isolated crystalline d-tubocurarine with a good yield and they identified it with the compound previously isolated (in 1935) by Harold King. The distinction between King’s work in 1935 and Wintersteiner and Dutcher’s subsequent work is that King isolated only small amounts from an unauthenticated specimen whereas Wintersteiner and Dutcher performed a high-yield isolation from curare made from a single identified plant species. Their research was part of Squibb's investigation of curare preparations; Squibb had introduced Intocostrin, a purified and standardized curare extract whose activity was due principally to d-tubocurarine, in 1939.

== Honors ==
- Citation of Merit from President Harry S. Truman for wartime research on penicillin.
- William H. Nichols Medal of the New York Section of the American Chemical Society (1950).
- Elected to the National Academy of Sciences (1950).

Wintersteiner was nominated for the Nobel Prize in Physiology or Medicine in 1950 by Erik Jorpes and in 1952 by Karl Sune Detlof Bergström. The 1950 nomination cited his work on adrenocortical hormones.

== Later life and death ==
Wintersteiner lived in Princeton, New Jersey, until his retirement. He died after a long illness at his home in Graz, Austria, on August 15, 1971.
