= René Binet =

René Binet may refer to:

- René Binet (translator) (1732–1812), French translator
- René Binet (neo-Fascist) (1913–1957), French political activist
- René Binet (architect) (1866–1911), French architect
