= Artur Pappenheim =

German physician and hematologist

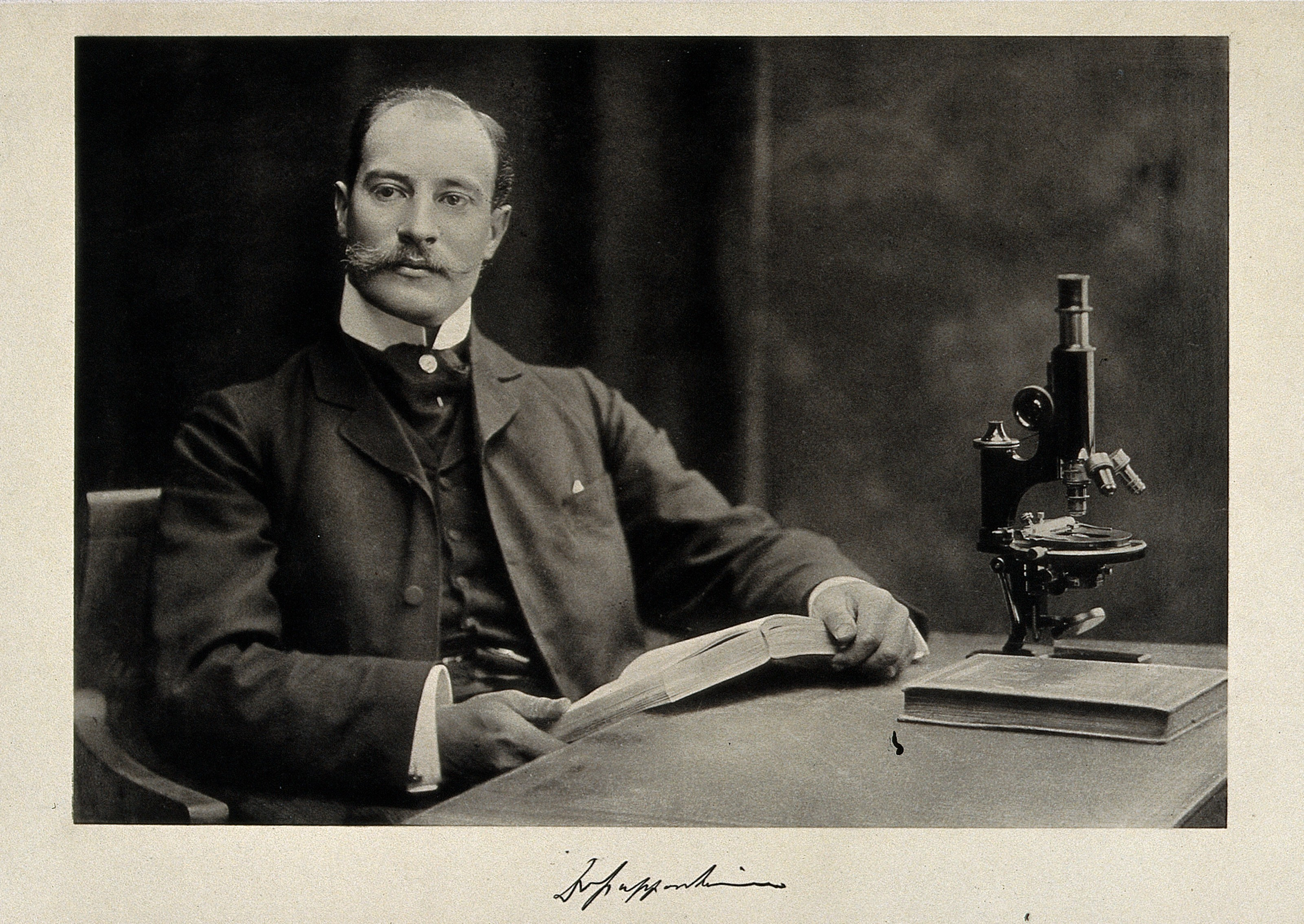
Artur Pappenheim Credit: Wellcome Collection

Artur Pappenheim (13 December 1870 in Berlin – 31 December 1916) was a German physician and hematologist, remembered for his pioneer efforts in stem cell research.

== Biography ==
Of Jewish origins, initially he studied mathematics and philosophy, but his focus later turned to medicine, and in 1895 received his medical degree from the University of Berlin. Subsequently, he became an assistant to Joseph von Mering at the University of Halle, and afterwards worked under neurologist Ludwig Lichtheim in Königsberg. Later he was an assistant to dermatologist Paul Gerson Unna in Hamburg and to internist Ernst Viktor von Leyden in Berlin. In 1912 he obtained the title of professor. He died on December 31, 1916, of spotted typhus.

Pappenheim was a prolific writer, being the author of several books and numerous scientific papers. He was the founder of Folia haematologica, a journal dedicated to hematology. With Hans Hirschfeld, he was a catalyst towards the founding of the Berliner Hämatologischen Gesellschaft (1908).

Today, the Deutsche Gesellschaft für Hämatologie und Onkologie (German Society of Hematology and Oncology) issues an annual "Artur-Pappenheim-Preis" for the best work in the fields of hematology or haematological oncology.

== Associated eponyms ==
- "Pappenheim's stain I": A staining method used for differentiating tubercle and smegma bacilli.
- "Pappenheim's stain II" (Unna-Pappenheim stain): A methylene green–pyronin staining method commonly used for blood smears.

== Selected writings ==
- Die Bildung der roten Blutscheiben, 1895
- Grundriss der Farbchemie zum Gebrauch bei mikroskopischen Arbeiten, 1901
- Atlas der menschlichen Blutzellen, 1905-1912
- Grundriss der haematologischen Diagnostik und praktischen Blutuntersuchung, VIII + 264 pages, 1911
- Technik der klinischen Blutuntersuchung, 1911; later translated into English and published as "Clinical Examination Of The Blood And Its Technique: A Manual For Students And Practitioners" (1914).
- Über die verschiedenen lymphoiden Zellformen des normalen und pathologischen Blutes, 1911 (with Adolfo Ferrata 1880-1946).
- Morphologische Hämatologie. Volume 1 published by Hans Hirschfeld (1873-1944). Leipzig, W. Klinkhardt, 1919.

== See also ==
- List of pathologists
