= James Gamble =

James Gamble may refer to:

- James Gamble (industrialist) (1803–1891), U.S.-based Irish soapmaker and industrialist; co-founder of Procter & Gamble Company
- James Gamble (politician) (1809–1883), U.S. Representative from Pennsylvania
- James Gamble (telegraph) (1826–1905), Piedmont resident, and builder of the first telegraph in California
- James Sykes Gamble (1847–1925), English botanist
- James Fulton Gamble, Northern Irish politician
- James Gamble (1995–2015), Canadian co-conspirator responsible for the Halifax mass shooting plot
- James Gamble (pediatrician), America medical researcher
