= Haematologica =

- Discipline: Hematology
- Language: English
- Edited by: Jacob M. Rowe

Publication details
- Former name: The Hematology Journal
- History: 1920–present
- Publisher: Ferrata Storti Foundation (Italy)
- Frequency: Monthly
- Open access: Yes
- License: CC BY-NC
- Impact factor: 11.049 (2021)

Standard abbreviations
- ISO 4: Haematologica

Indexing
- CODEN: HAEMAX
- ISSN: 0390-6078 (print); 1592-8721 (web)
- LCCN: 2004208974
- OCLC no.: 1118753

Links
- Journal homepage; Online archive

Haematologica is a monthly peer-reviewed open access medical journal published by the Ferrata Storti Foundation. The editor-in-chief is Jacob M. Rowe (Rambam Medical Center, Haifa, Israel). The journal covers all topics related to experimental and clinical hematology. It was established in 1920 by Adolfo Ferrata.

== Abstracting and indexing ==
The journal is abstracted and indexed in Biological Abstracts, BIOSIS Previews, Current Contents/Clinical Medicine, Current Contents/Life Sciences, Embase, Science Citation Index Expanded, and Scopus. According to the Journal Citation Reports, the journal has a 2021 impact factor of 11.049.
