= Hans Hirschfeld (hematologist) =

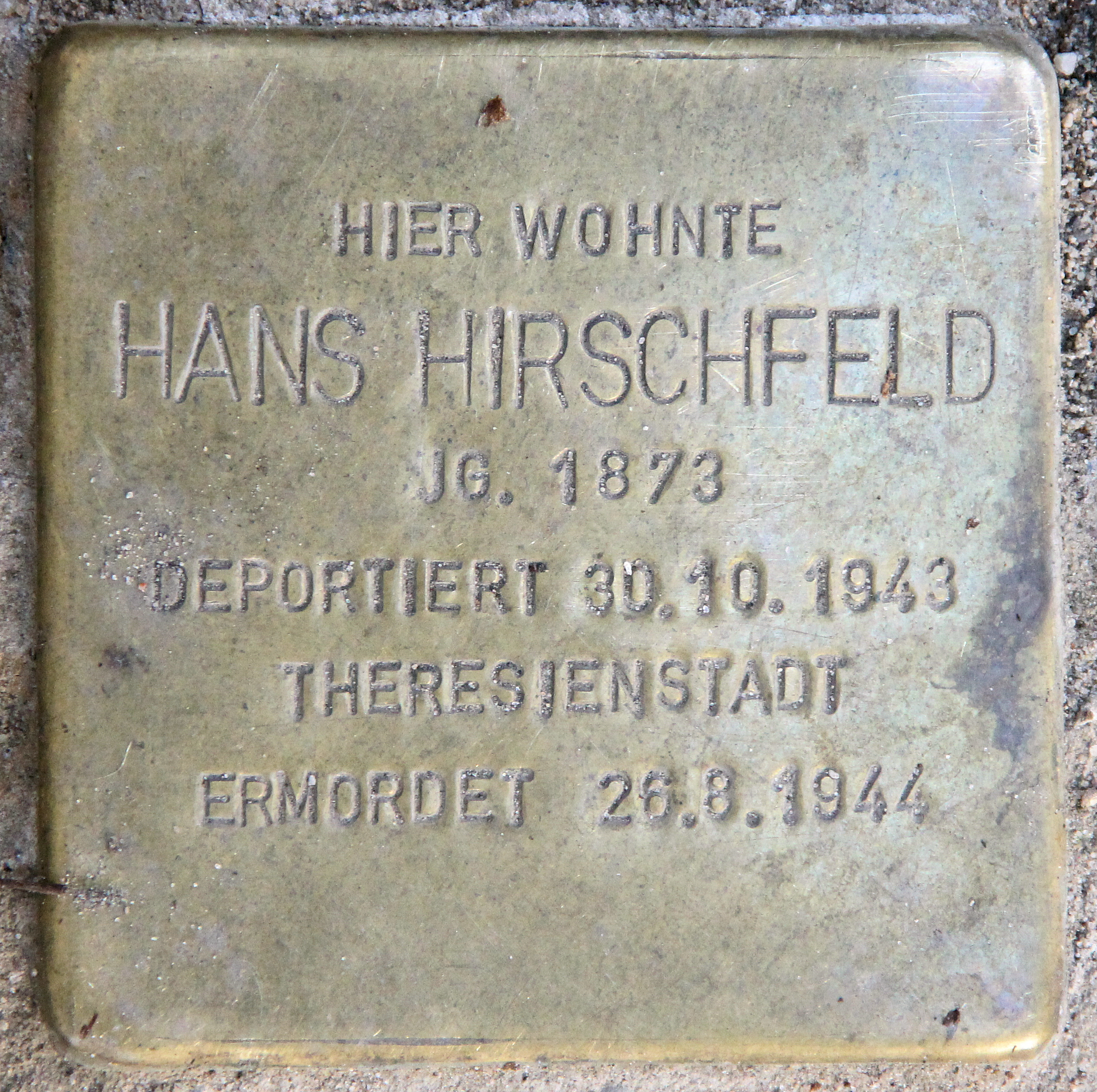
Stolperstein in Berlin

Hans Hirschfeld (20 March 1873 in Berlin – 26 August 1944) was a German-Jewish hematologist.

== Biography ==
He studied medicine at the University of Berlin (1891–97), and following graduation began his residency at Moabit Hospital-Berlin. From 1910 he worked at the cancer institute of the Berlin-Charité. In 1919 he obtained his habilitation with a thesis on pernicious anemia, becoming a professor in 1922.

After enforcement of the Nazi edict, Gesetz zur Wiederherstellung des Berufsbeamtentums (1933), Hirschfeld was forced into taking early leave, later losing his teaching licence and his right to practice medicine. In October 1942 he was deported to the Theresienstadt concentration camp, where he died on 26 August 1944.

Hirschfeld was the author of many publications in the fields of hematology and histology. He is known for his studies of blood diseases and his research on the pathology of the spleen. With hematologist Artur Pappenheim (1870–1916) he conducted studies involving microscopic differentiation of blood cells.

He was an editor of several hematological journals, including the "Folia Haematologica". He was an early member of the Hämatologischen Gesellschaft, predecessor of the Deutschen Gesellschaft für Hämatologie und Onkologie (German Society for Hematology and Oncology (DGHO).

== Selected writings ==
- Die Erkrankungen der Milz, 1920 -- diseases of the spleen
- Morphologische Hämatologie, 1919 (with Artur Pappenheim 1870–1916)-- morphological hematology
- Lehrbuch der Blutkrankheiten für Ärzte und Studierende, 1928 -- Textbook of blood disorders for physicians and students.
- Handbuch der Allgemeinen Hämatologie, 1932 (with Anton Hittmair 1892–1986)-- Textbook of general hematology.
