= Acute erythroid leukemia =

Acute erythrocyte leukemia
- Other names: Di Guglielmo syndrome
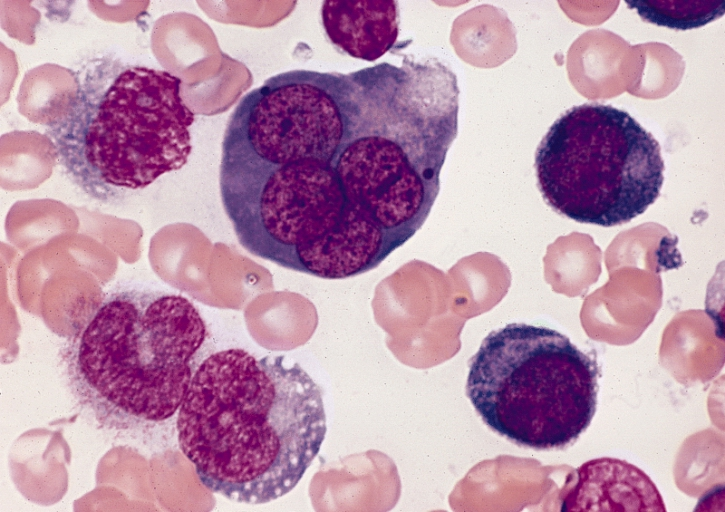
- Bone marrow smear from a case of erythroleukemia
- Specialty: Hematology, oncology

Acute erythrocyte leukemia (AEL) is an extremely rare form of acute myeloid leukemia (less than 1% of AML cases) which is characterized by neoplastic proliferation of erythroid cells with features of maturation arrest (increased erythroblasts) and high prevalence of biallelic TP53 alterations. It is defined as type "M6" under the FAB classification.

== Signs and symptoms ==
The most common symptoms of AEL are related to pancytopenia (a shortage of all types of blood cells), including fatigue, infections, and mucocutaneous bleeding. Almost half of people with AEL exhibit weight loss, fever and night sweats at the time of diagnosis. Almost all people with AEL are anemic, and 77% have a hemoglobin level under 10.0 g/dl. Signs of thrombocytopenia are found in about half of people with AEL.

== Causes ==
The causes of AEL are unknown. Prior to a 2008 reclassification by the World Health Organization, cases that evolved from myelodysplastic syndromes, myeloproliferative neoplasms, chemotherapy for other cancers or exposure to toxins were defined as secondary AEL. These cases are now likely to instead be classified as acute myeloid leukemia with myelodysplasia-related changes or therapy-related AML. +

== Diagnosis ==
Acute erythroid leukemias can be classified as follows:

=== M6a (Erythroleukemia) ===
50% or more of all nucleated bone marrow cells are erythroblasts, dyserythropoiesis is prominent and 20% or more of the remaining cells (non- erythroid) are myeloblasts.

=== M6b (Pure erythroid leukemia) ===
In rare cases the erythroid lineage is the only obvious component of an acute leukemia; a myeloblast component is not apparent. The erythroid component consists predominantly or exclusively of proerythroblasts and early basophilic erythroblasts. These cells may constitute 90% or more of the marrow elements. Despite this lack of myeloblasts, these cases should be considered acute leukemias. In a WHO proposal the blastic leukemias that are limited to the erythroid series are designated pure erythroid malignancies.

=== M6c (Erythroleukemia and Pure erythroid leukemia) ===
Myeloblast- and proerythroblast-rich mixed variant.

== Treatment ==
Treatment for erythroleukemia generally follows that for other types of AML, not otherwise specified. It consists of chemotherapy, frequently consisting of cytarabine, daunorubicin, and idarubicin. It can also involve bone marrow transplantation.

== Prognosis ==
Information on prognosis is limited by the rarity of the condition. Prognosis appears to be no different from AML in general, taking into account other risk factors. Acute erythroid leukemia (M6) has a relatively poor prognosis. A 2010 study of 124 patients found a median overall survival of 8 months. A 2009 study on 91 patients found a median overall survival for erythroleukemia patients of 36 weeks, with no statistically significant difference to other AML patients. AEL patients did have a significantly shorter disease-free survival period, a median of 32 weeks, but this effect was explained by other prognostic factors. That is, AEL is often associated with other risk factors, like monosomal karyotypes and a history of myelodysplastic syndrome. Prognosis is worse in elderly patients, those with a history of myelodysplastic syndrome, and in patients who had previously received chemotherapy for the treatment of a different neoplasm.

== Epidemiology ==
Acute erythroid leukemia is rare, accounting for only 3–5% of all acute myeloid leukemia cases. One study estimated an occurrence rate of 0.077 cases per 100,000 people each year. 64–70% of people with this condition are male, and most are elderly, with a median age of 65.

== History ==
The first known case of acute erythroid leukemia was described in 1912 by M. Copelli under the name erythromatosis. In 1917, Italian hematologist Giovanni Di Guglielmo (1886–1962), expanded on the description, coining the name "eritroleucemia" (Italian for erythroleukemia). Di Guglielmo was the first to recognize the leukemic nature of the condition, and it is sometimes referred to as Di Guglielmo's syndrome in recognition of his work. Ernst Neumark was widely credited for introducing Di Guglielmo's syndrome to English pathology.

Chris Squire, bassist from the progressive rock group Yes, died from complications related to acute erythroid leukemia on June 27, 2015.
