= Banet =

Banet is a surname. Notable people with the surname include:

- Herb Banet (1913–2003), American football player
- Vicente Banet, Cuban tennis player
- Vincent Banet, French rugby league player
- Sarah Banet-Weiser (born 1966), American academic and author

== See also ==
- Binet
