= Frank Norman Wilson =

American cardiologist (1890–1952)

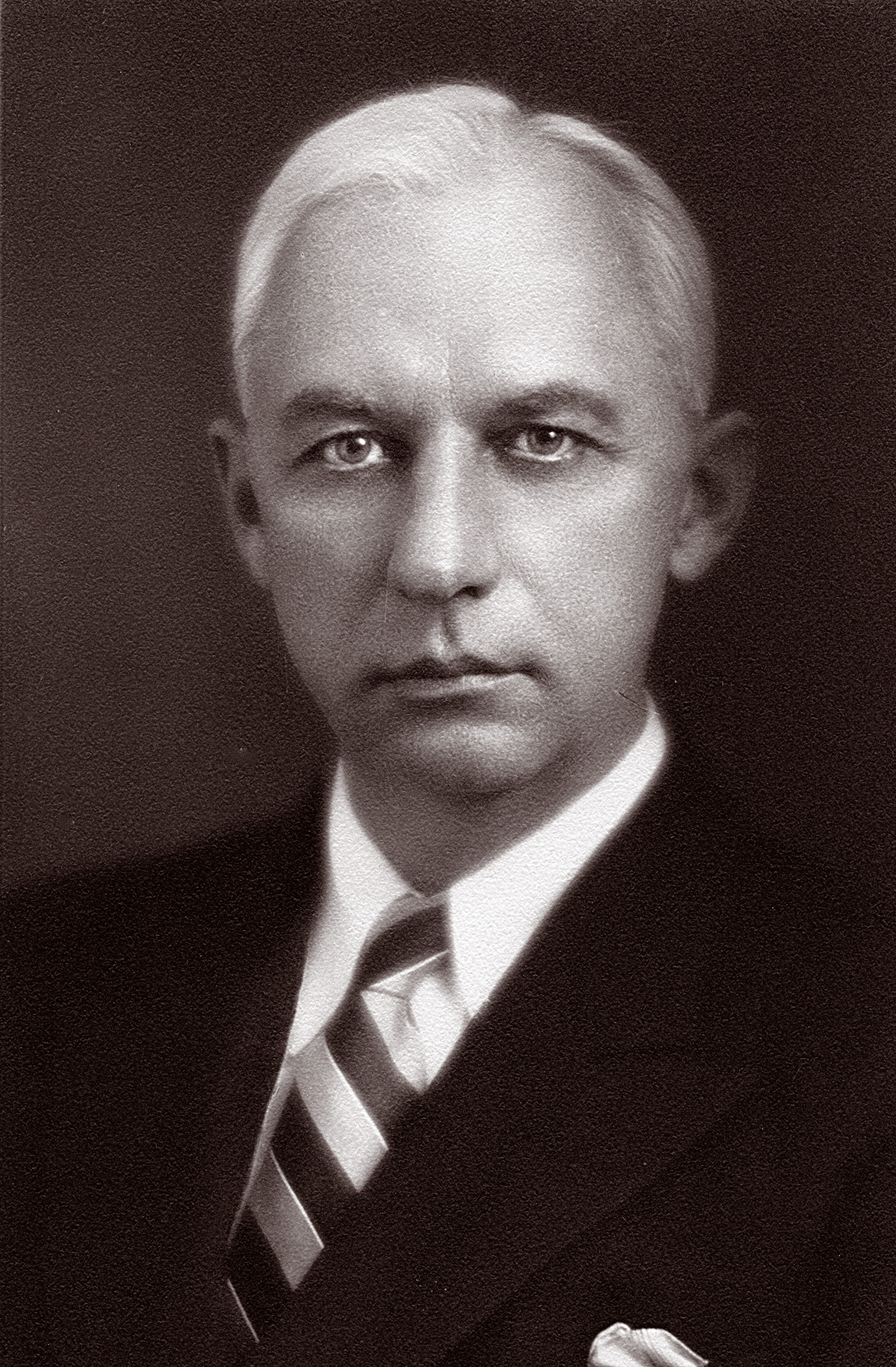
- Born: November 19, 1890
- Died: September 11, 1952 (aged 61)
- Education: University of Michigan (B.S., M.D.)
- Known for: Cardiology

Frank Norman Wilson (19 November 1890 – 11 September 1952) was an American cardiologist known primarily for his contributions to electrocardiography.

== Early life ==
He was the only child of Norman Orlando Wilson, a farmer, and Mary Holtz Wilson. He studied at the University of Michigan in Ann Arbor, first graduating with a bachelor of Science degree in 1911, later graduating with a medical degree in 1913 from the same university.

== Medicine ==
Our modern understanding of the electrocardiogram comes, in large part, from the lifelong research and teaching of Frank Norman Wilson. In his prime, Wilson dominated the use of the electrocardiogramas only two men, Thomas Lewis and Willem Einthoven.

Dr. Wilson's outstanding work was paid tribute during the year of his 60th birthday well before his death. The July 1950 edition of the American Heart Association (Circulation) was dedicated to Dr. Wilson. He also received the Gold Heart Medal of the American Heart Association at the time of their annual meeting in 1951.

Dr. Wilson conducted thorough investigations in the field of electrocardiography. All of his work in this domain was done primarily to explain why certain changes appear in electrocardiograms under particular circumstances. Although some of his work, particularly early studies, were concerned with the cardiac arrhythmias and other related subjects, much of his research was on the study of the ventricular complex, and his contributions in connection with bundle branch block, myocardial infarction, ventricular hypertrophy and T wave abnormalities, provide the basis for much of our current knowledge of these conditions. His extensive knowledge of bio-electric phenomena enabled him to devise the central terminal arrangement and the ventricular gradient, one of the most fundamental concepts in electrocardiography.

In addition to his papers and research contributions, Dr. Wilson also had a notable influence as a teacher and interpreter of electrocardiograms. His knowledge of the electrical phenomena underlying the electrocardiogram contributed to his understanding that factors other than heart disease could affect electrocardiographic findings, and he commented that greater familiarity with electrocardiography could encourage more cautious interpretation of the records.

Much of Dr. Wilson's time in the last years of his active service was devoted to informal teaching of electrocardiography to doctors who came from all over the world to study in Ann Arbor under him. Many of the physicians who studied at the Heart Station would go on to occupy teaching posts in this country or abroad, and all of them regarded Dr. Wilson with a respect that is close to reverence. His work was extremely influential in the ongoing research of Dr. Robert H. Bayley at the University of Oklahoma towards the understanding of the biophysical principles of electrocardiology.

Although Dr. Wilson's life was dedicated primarily to electrocardiography he had many other interests and hobbies. Both he and his wife loved the country and for over 20 years spent more and more of their time on their simple farm near Stockbridge. Here he enjoyed the study of birds and bird photography which developed into his familiarity with optical equipment leading to a profound interest in astronomy.

Dr. Wilson was the first person to describe Wolff-Parkinson-White Syndrome.

== See also ==
- List of nominees for the Nobel Prize in Physiology or Medicine (1950–1959)
