= Giovanni Di Guglielmo =

Italian hematologist

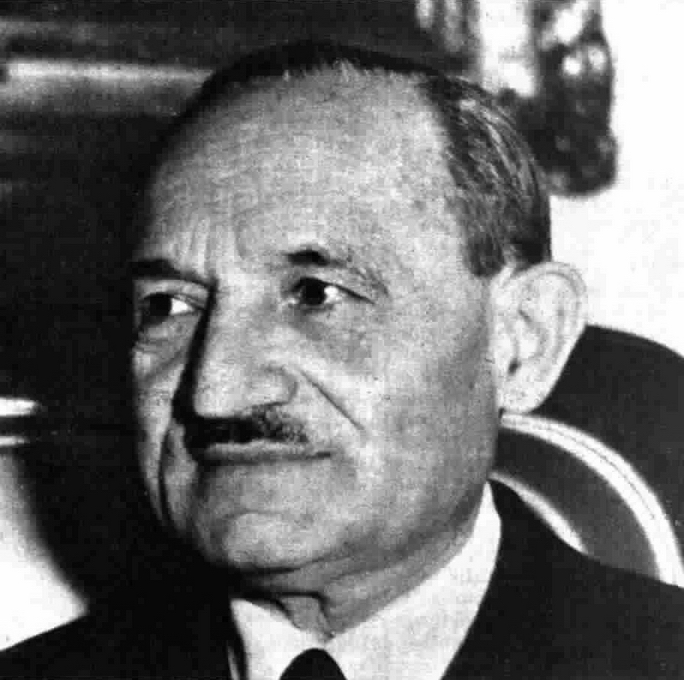
- Di Guglielmo in Radiocorriere magazine, 1954.
- Born: 22 September 1886; São Paulo, Brazil
- Died: 19 February 1961 (aged 74); Rome, Italy

Giovanni Di Guglielmo (22 September 1886 – 19 February 1961) was a Brazilian-born Italian hematologist, best known for the discovery of acute erythroid leukemia.

== Life and career ==
Di Guglielmo was born in São Paulo, the son of Italian immigrants from Andretta. His parents decided to move back to Italy when Giovanni was 6 years old. After completing his high school studies in Avellino, in 1911 he graduated in Medicine and Surgery at the University of Naples.

After being assistant of the haematologist Adolfo Ferrata, in 1916 Di Guglielmo got the university teaching qualification in medical special pathology. During the First World War he served as medical lieutenant, and during this time he started writing on erythroleukemia and other leukemic diseases. In 1927 he was appointed professor of special pathology at the University of Modena, and later he served as professor in the universities of Pavia, Catania, Naples and Rome. He also founded and directed several medical institutions, including the Center for the Study of the brucellosis in Catania, and two scientific journals, Progresso medico and Haematologica.

Di Guglielmo's studies mainly focused on hematology; among other things, he demonstrated the shift in the peripheral blood of Gaucher's cells and recognized the erythroid island as "an anatomical and functional unit". He got international recognition for the discovery of acute erythroid leukemia, also known as "Di Guglielmo syndrome" or "Di Guglielmo's disease". He was author of over 230 scientific publications.
