= Axel Westman =

Swedish obstetrician-gynecologist

Professor Axel Westman
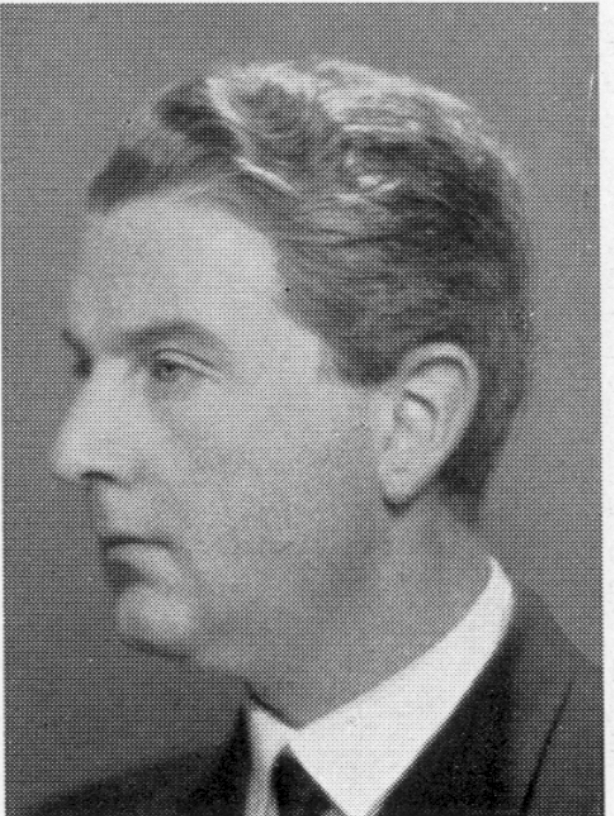
- Axel Westman in 1940
- Born: 29 December 1894; Stockholm, Sweden
- Died: 29 May 1960 (aged 65); Stockholm, Sweden
- Known for: Obstetrics and gynaecology

Professor Axel Westman (29 December 1894 – 29 May 1960) was a Swedish physician and one of the foremost specialists in obstetrics and gynaecology of the twentieth century.

In 1927, he was appointed lectureship in obstetrics and gynaecology at the Karolinska Institute in Stockholm. He went on to hold lectureship posts at Lund University and Uppsala University.

He was nominated for the Nobel Prize in Physiology or Medicine in 1951.
