= Dickinson W. Richards =

American physician and physiologist (1895–1973)

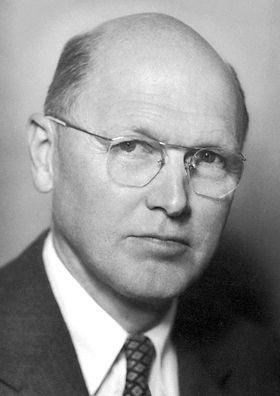
- Born: Dickinson Woodruff Richards Jr. October 30, 1895; Orange, New Jersey, U.S.
- Died: February 23, 1973 (aged 77); Lakeville, Connecticut, U.S.
- Education: Yale University (BA); Columbia University (MA, MD)
- Known for: cardiac catheterization
- Awards: Nobel Prize in Physiology or Medicine in 1956
- Scientific career
- Fields: Physiology
- Workplaces: Columbia University; Bellevue Hospital; Presbyterian Hospital

Dickinson Woodruff Richards Jr. (October 30, 1895 – February 23, 1973) was an American physician and physiologist. He was a co-recipient of the Nobel Prize in Physiology or Medicine in 1956 with André Cournand and Werner Forssmann for the development of cardiac catheterization and the characterisation of a number of cardiac diseases.

== Early life ==
Richards was born in Orange, New Jersey. He was educated at the Hotchkiss School in Connecticut, and entered Yale University in 1913. At Yale he studied English and Greek, graduating in 1917 as a member of the senior society Scroll and Key.

== Career ==
He joined the United States Army in 1917, and became an artillery instructor. He served from 1918 to 1919 as an artillery officer in France.

When he returned to the United States, Richards attended Columbia University College of Physicians and Surgeons, graduating with an M.A. in 1922 and his M.D. degree in 1923. He was on the staff of the Presbyterian Hospital in New York until 1927, when he went to England to work at the National Institute for Medical Research in London, under Sir Henry Dale, on the control of circulation in the liver.

In 1928, Richards returned to the Presbyterian Hospital and began his research on pulmonary and circulatory physiology, working under Professor Lawrence Henderson of Harvard. He began collaborations with André Cournand at Bellevue Hospital, New York, working on pulmonary function. Initially their research focussed on methods to study pulmonary function in patients with pulmonary disease.

Their next area of research was the development of a technique for catheterization of the heart. Using this technique they were able to study and characterise traumatic shock, the physiology of heart failure. They measured the effects of cardiac drugs and described various forms of dysfunction in chronic cardiac diseases and pulmonary diseases and their treatment, and developed techniques for the diagnosis of congenital heart diseases. For this work, Richards, Cournand, and Werner Forssmann were awarded the Nobel Prize for Physiology or Medicine for 1956.

In 1945 Richards moved his lab to Bellevue Hospital, New York. In 1947 he was made the Lambert Professor of Medicine at Columbia University, where he had taught since 1925. During his career he also served as an advisor to Merck Sharp and Dohme Company, and edited the Merck Manual. Richards retired from his positions at Bellevue and Columbia in 1961.

== Global policy ==
He was one of the signatories of the agreement to convene a convention for drafting a world constitution. As a result, for the first time in human history, a World Constituent Assembly convened to draft and adopt the Constitution for the Federation of Earth.

== Honor ==
Richards received many other honors, including the John Phillips Memorial Award of the American College of Physicians in 1960, the Chevalier de la Legion d'Honneur in 1963, the Trudeau Medal in 1968, and the Kober Medal of the Association of American Physicians in 1970.

He died in Lakeville, Connecticut and his wife Constance in 1990.
