= Friedrich Feyrter =

Austrian pathologist (1895–1973)

Friedrich Feyrter (2 June 1895, Vienna – 2 December 1973, Bad Fischau-Brunn) was an Austrian pathologist.

In 1934 he obtained his habilitation with the thesis "Carcinoid und Carcinom", later serving as a professor in Danzig, Graz and Göttingen.

Best known for establishing the concept of the diffuse neuroendocrine system (DNES), he also made contributions in his research of various benign and malignant tumors, the transformation of lipids, the origin of the nevus and on disorders of cellular metabolism.

== Associated eponyms ==
- "Feyrter's cells": Synonym for neuroendocrine cells, also known as "clear cells" or Kultschitzky cells.
- "Feyrter disease": Plasmacytosis of pulmonary tissue that affects premature infants.

== Selected works ==
- Über diffuse endokrine epitheliale Organe, 1938 – On diffuse endocrine epithelial organs.
- Über die Histopathologie der Masern des Menschen, 1947 – On the histopathology of measles in humans.
- Über Neurome und Neurofibromatose, nach Untersuchungen am menschlichen Magendarmschlauch, 1948 – On neuromas and neurofibromatosis, according to studies on the human gastrointestinal tract.
- Über die Pathologie der vegetativen nervösen Peripherie und ihrer ganglionären Regulationsstätten, 1950 – On the pathology of the autonomic nervous periphery and associated ganglionic regulatory regions.
- Über die peripheren endokrinen (parakrinen) Drüsen des Menschen, 1953 – On the peripheral endocrine (paracrine) glands of humans.

== See also ==
- Small cell carcinoma
