= Juliette Binet =

French author

Juliette Binet (born in 1984) is a French author and illustrator for children's literature.

== Biography ==
Juliette Binet was born in Rennes. She lived in Tours before moving to Nantes. She studied at the Arts décoratifs de Strasbourg. She currently works and lives in Paris.

== Awards ==
In 2005, she was selected for the Annual International Competition of Illustration of the City of Chioggia. In 2007, she received the "Ritleng" price given by the city of Strasbourg.

In 2008, she received the illustration price from the Musée de l'illustration jeunesse, in Moulins, in the province of Allier.

== Bibliography ==
She has participated in many publications, including :

- Edmond (2007)
- Poésie japonaise (2007)
- L'Ombre d'Igor (2009)
- Jonas (2009)
- Le Cousin (2010)
- Je ne veux pas vieillir (2010)
- Cendrillon (2011)
- L'Horizon facétieux (2012)
- Hourra ! (2015)
- Les Trois Cheveux d'or du diable (2015)
- Le Mauvais Pli (2017)
- Monts et Merveilles (2019)
