= Jörgen Lehmann =

Danish-born Swedish physician and chemist (1898–1989)

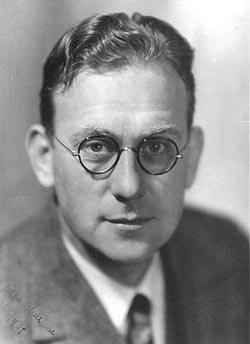
- Born: 15 January 1898
- Died: 26 December 1989 (aged 91)
- Known for: PAS tuberculosis therapy
- Awards: Björkénska priset (1951)

Jörgen Erik Lehmann (15 January 1898 – 26 December 1989) was a Danish-Swedish physician and clinical chemist best known for his discovery in the 1940s that para-amino salicylic acid (PAS) would make an excellent orally-available tuberculosis therapy. PAS was, together with streptomycin, the first efficacious anti-microbial therapy for tuberculosis and remained in clinical use for several decades. The exclusion of him as a Nobel laureate in 1952 was highly controversial, and the discoverer of streptomycin, Selman Waksman, was the sole recipient of the Nobel Prize in Physiology or Medicine that year. In 1941, Lehmann also developed the anti-coagulant dicumarol, which is used for the prevention of blood clots and in the treatment of deep venous thrombosis.

Lehmann studied under Torsten Thunberg, professor of physiology in Lund, who discovered the dehydrogenases. Lehmann was appointed professor of physiology in Aarhus in 1937, and became head of the central laboratory at the Sahlgrenska University Hospital in Gothenburg 1938. After retiring in 1963, Lehmann continued his research at the Nobel Laureate Arvid Carlsson's institution at the University of Gothenburg.

Jörgen Lehmann was son of Edvard Lehmann, professor of History of Religions at Lund University and grandnephew of the Danish politician Orla Lehmann.
