= James Gamble (pediatrician) =

American pediatrician

James Lawder Gamble (Pediatrician)
- Born: July 18, 1883; Millersburg, Bourbon County, Kentucky, U.S.
- Died: May 28, 1959 (aged 75)
- Education: Stanford University (B.A., 1906), Harvard Medical School (M.D., 1910)
- Known for: Electrolyte physiology, fluid and electrolyte therapy, "Gamblegrams"
- Awards: John Howland Medal (1955), Kober Medal (1951), Borden Award (1946), Chapin Award (1950), Moxon Medal (1954)
- Scientific career
- Fields: Pediatrics, Physiology
- Workplaces: Harvard Medical School, Boston Children's Hospital, Johns Hopkins University

James Lawder Gamble (July 18, 1883 – May 28, 1959) was an American physician and medical researcher known for pioneering work in body fluid and electrolyte physiology, particularly in pediatrics His quantitative studies of body-fluid balance, acid–base metabolism, and dehydration helped lay the foundation for modern fluid and electrolyte therapy. He was a professor of pediatrics at Harvard Medical School, Editor-in-Chief of The Journal of Clinical Investigation, and a member of the National Academy of Sciences. Gamble was nominated for the Nobel Prize in Physiology or Medicine in 1952.

== Early life and education ==
Gamble was born in Millersburg, Bourbon County, Kentucky. He earned an A.B. from Stanford University in 1906 and an M.D., cum laude, from Harvard Medical School in 1910.

== Academic and research career ==
Following a medical internship at Massachusetts General Hospital and pediatric training at Boston Children's Hospital, he began his research career in clinical investigation under Dr. Fritz Talbot. In 1915, Gamble joined the new Department of Pediatrics under John Howland at Johns Hopkins University, where he began studies using quantitative chemical and physiological methods to investigate disease mechanisms in children. He conducted pioneering research in electrolyte metabolism, demonstrating that infants can synthesize cholesterol and elucidating mechanisms of acid–base balance during fasting.

In 1922 he moved to Boston to join the faculty of Harvard Medical School and Boston Children's Hospital, becoming associate professor in 1925 and full professor in 1932. He retired as professor emeritus in 1950 but continued research and mentoring.

Gamble emphasized clear experimental design and quantitative analysis. He described the distribution of water and electrolytes in body fluids and developed graphical representations of electrolyte relationships now known as "Gamblegrams." His work influenced generations of clinicians and physiologists and contributed to modern understanding of dehydration, acidosis, and fluid therapy.

Uncommon at the time, Gamble's research brought clear experimental design and quantitative analysis to clinical research. He described the distribution of water and electrolytes in body fluids and developed graphical representations of electrolyte relationships now colloquially known as “Gamblegrams.”

He also collaborated on studies simulating conditions of starvation and dehydration, such as “life-raft ration” research during World War II, which helped clarify physiological requirements for survival with limited food and water.

== Leadership and editorial work ==
Gamble served as Editor-in-Chief of The Journal of Clinical Investigation during and after World War II, maintaining high scientific standards and modernizing editorial practices. In 1945, he served as president of the American Pediatric Society.

== Awards and honors ==
- Borden Award, American Academy of Pediatrics (1946)
- Chapin Award, Rhode Island Medical Society (1950)
- Kober Medal, Association of American Physicians (1951)
- Moxon Medal, Royal College of Physicians, London (1954)
- John Howland Award, American Pediatric Society (1955)
- Honorary degrees: Yale University (S.M., 1930), University of Zurich (M.D., 1950), University of Chicago (Sc.D., 1952)
- Member of the National Academy of Sciences
- Member of the American Academy of Arts and Sciences

== Nobel Prize nomination ==
In 1952, Gamble was nominated for the Nobel Prize in Physiology or Medicine by Ödön Kerpel-Fronius, recognizing his influential contributions to medical science, particularly in electrolyte and body-fluid physiology.

== Legacy ==
Dehydration was and remains a major burden of illness in childhood and Gamble's research helped transform pediatric fluid and electrolyte management into a quantitative clinical science which endures to current day. Equally the work had an impact on clinical practice across other specialties. His work influenced generations of clinicians and physiologists and contributed to modern understanding of dehydration, acidosis, and fluid therapy.
