= Binet-Valmer =

Franco-Swiss writer and journalist (1875–1940)

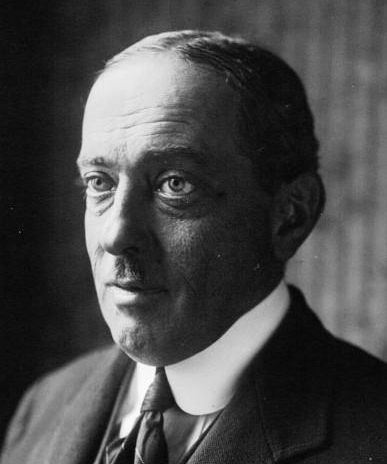
- Binet-Valmer in 1921
- Born: Jean-Auguste-Gustave Binet; 3 June 1875; Geneva, Switzerland
- Died: 20 April 1940 (aged 64); Paris, France
- Occupations: novelist and journalist
- Writing career
- Notable work: Lucien

Jean-Auguste-Gustave Binet (3 June 1875 – 20 April 1940), also known as Binet-Valmer, was a Franco-Swiss novelist and journalist. The trademark element of his style was the almost clinical precision with which he dissected the psychologies and motivations of his characters.

== Biography ==
Born as the son of a physician, Binet-Valmer initially also studied medicine, but later turned his attention towards writing novels and reviews. Although Binet-Valmer was not homosexual himself, several of his novels, particularly his most famous one, Lucien, deal with homosexual themes and characters.

Lucien was by far Binet-Valmer's most successful book in France, getting released in no fewer than 22 printings between its first edition in 1910 and 1919. It also caused a minor scandal because of its—for the time—risqué discussion of homosexuality. Marcel Proust's opinion of Lucien was damning—he wrote that it was the stupidest book he had ever read (le livre le plus imbécile que j'aie jamais lu). Other critics, such as Edmond Jaloux, had a far more favorable attitude towards the book. The ending of Lucien was very unusual for the time, because instead of having Lucien commit suicide (then considered more or less the standard ending for a novel with a homosexual protagonist), in the final paragraph Binet-Valmer lets him elope to Naples together with his boyfriend Reginald Green.

As a journalist, Binet-Valmer wrote for magazines such as Mercure de France, Le Matin, and Revue de Paris. He also indirectly caused Proust to change the title of his magnum opus, In Search of Lost Time: Initially it was called Les Intermittences du cœur, but when Proust learned that Binet-Valmer had published the novel Le Cœur en désordre (1912), the name was changed to À la recherche du temps perdu, with the former title making an appearance as a subtitle in the volume Sodome et Gomorrhe (1921/22). However, Proust later acknowledged in a letter to Jacques Boulenger, editor of L'Opinion, that "the whole press (except Binet-Valmer) deserted" him "about Sodome et Gomorrhe".

Novelist Georges Simenon was an assistant to Binet-Valmer for a few months in late 1922 and used that encounter for episodes in two of his novels (Les Noces de Poitiers and Le Passage de la ligne). From 1929, he rallyed publicly to Action Française, of which he was previously close, he joined the Camelots of the King, entered the Committee of the Association Marius Platteau (French Action Combators), accepts Maxime Real del Sarte the presidency of the companions of Jeanne d'Arc.

After the 1930s, Binet-Valmer fell into relative obscurity, especially compared to his contemporary Marcel Proust whose fame has eclipsed Binet-Valmer's ever since.

== Works ==
- Le Sphinx de plâtre, 1900
- Les Métèques, roman de mœurs parisiennes, 1900
- Le Gamin tendre, 1901
- Lucien, Ollendorff, 1910; Flammarion, 1921
- Notre pauvre amour, 1911
- Le Cœur en désordre, 1912
- La Créature, 1913
- La Passion, 1914
- Mémoires d'un engagé volontaire, Flammarion, 1918; Nabu Press, 2010
- Le Mendiant magnifique, 1919
- L'Enfant qui meurt, 1921
- Les Jours sans gloire, 1922
- Le Plaisir, illustré par des bois de Paul Baudier, 1923
- Le Désordre, 1923
- Le Désir et le Péché, 1923
- Une femme a tué, 1924
- Le Sang, 1924
- Les Exaltées, 1925
- Ceux qui ne volent pas, 1926
- Un grand Français: Coligny, 1927
- Sur le sable couchées, Flammarion, 1928
- Irina l'exilée, 1928
- La Vie amoureuse de Marie Walewska, la femme polonaise de Napoléon, 1928
- La Tragédie du retour, roman de l'amour et de l'âge, 1929
- La Lumière, roman d'une cécité, 1929
- La Foire d'empoigne, roman d'une autre république, Flammarion, 1930
- La Femme qui travaille, Flammarion, 1930
- La Prostituée ingénue, 1930
- Le Jardin de l'impure, 1930
- La Luxure, 1932
- Maîtres du monde, 1933
- Le Regard, 1934
- Bathilde et l'Assassin, 1935
- Sarah Bernhardt, 1936
- Le Fumier, 1936
- La Princesse nue, Fayard, 1937
- L'Héritage, 1938
- Les Esprits de ténèbres, 1940
