= Werner Forssmann =

German physician, Nobel prize winner (1904–1979)

Werner Forßmann
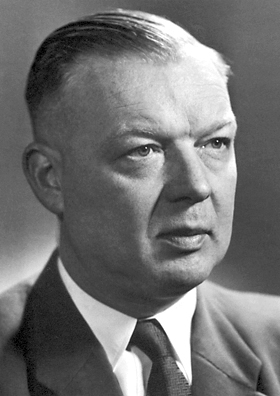
- Werner Forßmann
- Born: Werner Theodor Otto Forßmann; 29 August 1904; Berlin, German Empire
- Died: 1 June 1979 (aged 74); Schopfheim, West Germany
- Education: University of Berlin
- Known for: Cardiac catheterization
- Awards: Nobel Prize in Physiology or Medicine (1956)
- Scientific career
- Fields: Medicine

Werner Theodor Otto Forßmann (Forssmann in English; German pronunciation: [ˈvɛʁnɐ ˈfɔʁsˌman]; 29 August 1904 – 1 June 1979) was a German researcher and physician from Germany who shared the 1956 Nobel Prize in Medicine (with Andre Frederic Cournand and Dickinson W. Richards) for developing a procedure that allowed cardiac catheterization. In 1929, he put himself under local anesthesia and inserted a catheter into a vein of his arm. Not knowing if the catheter might pierce a vein, he put his life at risk. Forssmann was nevertheless successful; he safely passed the catheter into his heart.

== Early life ==
Forssmann was born in Berlin on 29 August 1904. Upon graduating from Askanisches Gymnasium, he entered the University of Berlin to study medicine, passing the State Examination in 1929.

== Career ==
He hypothesized that a catheter could be inserted directly into the heart, for such applications as directly delivering drugs, injecting radiopaque dyes, or measuring blood pressure. The fear at the time was that such an intrusion into the heart would be fatal. To prove his point, he decided to try the experiment on himself.

In 1929, while working in Eberswalde, he performed the first human cardiac catheterization. He ignored his department chief and persuaded the operating-room nurse in charge of the sterile supplies, Gerda Ditzen, to assist him. She agreed, but only on the promise that he would do it on her rather than on himself. However, Forssmann tricked her by restraining her to the operating table and pretending to locally anaesthetise and cut her arm whilst actually doing it on himself. He anesthetized his own lower arm in the cubital region and inserted a urinary catheter into his antecubital vein, threading it partly along before releasing Ditzen (who at this point realised the catheter was not in her arm) and telling her to call the X-ray department. They walked some distance to the X-ray department on the floor below where under the guidance of a fluoroscope he advanced the catheter the full 60 cm into his right ventricular cavity. This was then recorded on X-ray film showing the catheter lying in his right atrium.

The head clinician at Eberswalde, although initially very annoyed, recognized Werner's discovery when shown the X-rays; he allowed Forssmann to carry out another catheterization on a terminally ill woman whose condition improved after being given drugs in this way. An unpaid position was created for Forssmann at the Berliner Charité Hospital, working under Ferdinand Sauerbruch, although once Sauerbruch saw his paper, he was dismissed for continuing without his approval. Sauerbruch commented, "You certainly can't begin surgery in that manner". Facing such disciplinary action for self-experimentation, he was initially forced to leave the Charité, but was later reinstated until again being forced to leave in 1932 for not meeting scientific expectations. His surgical skills were noted, however, and he was recommended to another hospital where he worked for a while before leaving in 1933 after marrying Dr. Elsbet Engel, a specialist in urology there. Finding it difficult to get a job with his reputation, he quit cardiology and took up urology. He then went on to study urology under Karl Heusch at the Rudolf Virchow Hospital in Berlin. Later, he was appointed chief of the surgical clinic at both the City Hospital at Dresden-Friedrichstadt and the Robert Koch Hospital in Berlin.

From 1932 to 1945, he was a member of the Nazi Party. At the start of World War II, he became a medical officer. In the course of his service, he rose to the rank of major, until he was captured and put into a U.S. POW camp. Upon his release in 1945, he worked as a lumberjack and then as a country medic in the Black Forest with his wife. In 1950, he began practice as a urologist in Bad Kreuznach.

During the time of his imprisonment, his paper was read by André Frédéric Cournand and Dickinson W. Richards. They developed ways of applying his technique to heart disease diagnosis and research. In 1954, he was given the Leibniz Medal of the German Academy of Sciences. In 1956, the Nobel Prize in Physiology or Medicine was awarded to Cournand, Richards, and Forßmann.

After winning the Nobel Prize, he was given the position of honorary professor of surgery and urology at the University of Mainz. In 1961, he became an honorary professor at the National University of Córdoba. In 1962, he became a member of the executive board of the German Society of Surgery. He also became a member of the American College of Chest Physicians, honorary member of the Swedish Society of Cardiology, the German Society of Urology, and the German Child Welfare Association.

== Personal life ==
He and Elsbet had six children: Klaus Forßmann in 1934, Knut Forßmann in 1936, Jörg Forßmann in 1938, Wolf Forßmann in 1939 (who was first to isolate the atrial natriuretic peptide), Bernd Forßmann in 1940 (who helped develop the first clinical lithotriptor), and Renate Forßmann in 1943.

He died in Schopfheim, Germany, of heart failure on 1 June 1979. His wife died in 1993.

== See also ==
- André Frédéric Cournand
- Andreas Gruentzig
- Dickinson W. Richards
