= Louis Binet =

French painter (1744–1800)

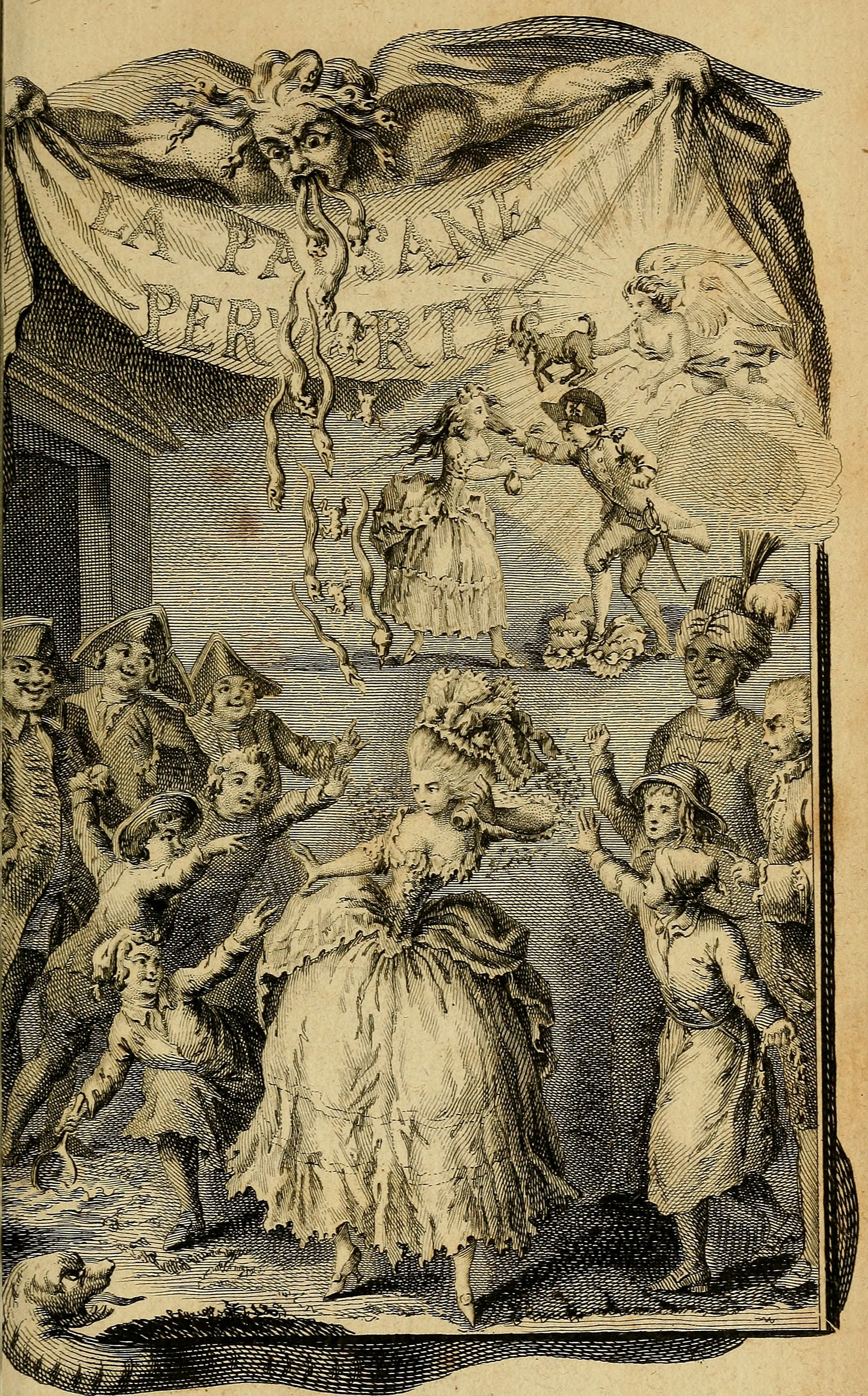
La paysane pervertie, ou Les dangers de la ville (1784)

Louis Binet (1744–1800) was a French painter, draughtsman, illustrator, and engraver.

== Life ==
Louis Binet was born in Paris in 1744. A pupil of Beauvarlet, he mainly worked for Restif de la Bretonne, whose portrait he painted, and whom he met in 1779 to illustrate La Malédiction paternelle. He provided illustrations for a number of other books by Restif, including Le Paysan perverti and Les Contemporaines. The illustrations of La Découverte australe are also attributed to him. Some of his drawings were sold as prints by Mondhare on the Rue Saint-Jacques, Paris. He also engraved several plates from works by Greuze, Van Loo, C. J. Vernet, and others.

Binet's works, and particularly his drawings, are highly sought after. Roger Portalis concluded "his drawings are original and not without value [...] but spoiled by the eccentricities of Restif".

== Works ==
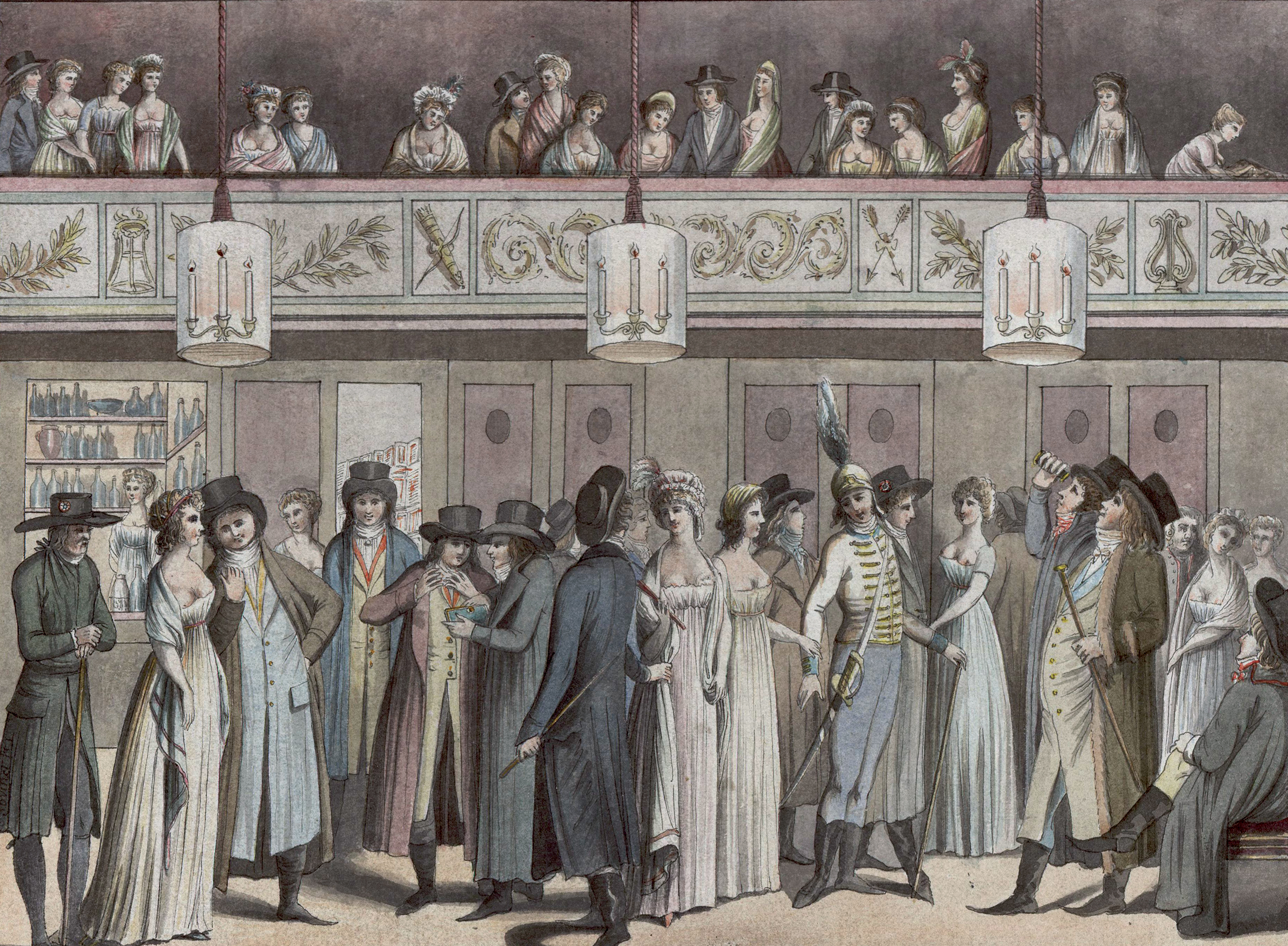
The Foyer of the Théâtre Montansier

- Abbé Banier, Les Métamorphoses en latin et en françois, de la traduction de M. l'abbé Banier,... avec des explications historiques, 4 vols. With plates by Bernard Picart, Pierre-François Basan, Noël Le Mire, and others (Paris, 1767–1771)
- Les amours de Daphnis et Chloé. New edition. With figures drawn by Binet, engraved by Blanchard (Paris, 1795)
- Jean de La Fontaine, Les amours de Psyché et de Cupidon. New edition. With figures drawn by Binet, engraved by Blanchard (Paris, 1796)
