= André Frédéric Cournand =

French-American physician and physiologist

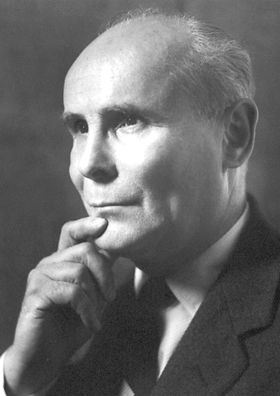
- Born: September 24, 1895; Paris, France
- Died: February 19, 1988 (aged 92); Great Barrington, Massachusetts, U.S.
- Education: University of Paris
- Known for: Cardiac catheterization
- Awards: Albert Lasker Award for Basic Medical Research (1949); Nobel Prize in Physiology or Medicine (1956)
- Scientific career
- Fields: Physiology
- Workplaces: Columbia University College of Physicians and Surgeons

André Frédéric Cournand (September 24, 1895 – February 19, 1988) was a French-American physician and physiologist.

== Biography ==
Cournand was awarded the Nobel Prize in Physiology or Medicine in 1956 along with Werner Forssmann and Dickinson W. Richards for the development of cardiac catheterization.

Born in Paris, Cournand emigrated to the United States in 1930 and, in 1941, became a naturalized citizen. For most of his career, Cournand was a professor at the Columbia University College of Physicians and Surgeons and worked at Bellevue Hospital in New York City.

Many seats of medical research have recognized his work, and he has received the Anders Retzius Silver Medal of the Swedish Society for Internal Medicine (1946), the Albert Lasker Award for Basic Medical Research (1949), the John Philipps Memorial Award of the American College of Physicians (1952), the Gold Medal of the Académie Royale de Médecine de Belgique and of the Académie Nationale de Médecine, Paris (1956). He was elected Doctor (honoris causa) of the Universities of Strasbourg (1957), Lyon (1958), Brussels (1959), Pisa (1961), and D.Sc. of the University of Birmingham (1961).

In 1981, Cournand became a founding member of the World Cultural Council.

His widow Beatrice died in 1993 aged 90.

== Sources ==
- Kenéz, J (November 1975). "A.F. Cournand, pioneer in respiratory function testing". Orvosi Hetilap. 116 (46): 2725–7. PMID 1105289.
- Riley, R L (October 1971). "The award of the Trudeau Medal for 1971 (Andre F. Cournand)". Am. Rev. Respir. Dis. 104 (4): 615–7. PMID 4937533.
