= Erik Jorpes =

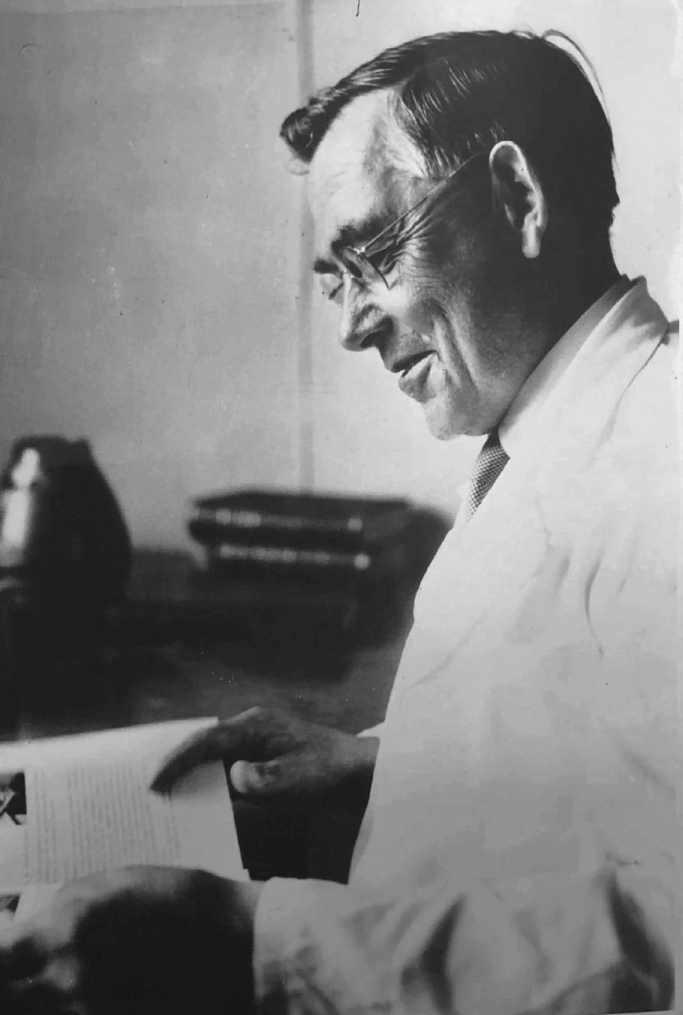
- Born: Johan Erik Johansson; 15 July 1894; Kökar, Grand Duchy of Finland
- Died: 10 July 1973 (aged 78); Stockholm, Sweden
- Citizenship: Finland (1894–1923); Sweden (1923–)
- Education: University of Helsinki, Karolinska Institute
- Known for: Heparin
- Awards: Alvarengas pris (1932); KTH Great Prize (1950); Berzelius Medal (1961); Anders Jahres medicinska pris (1963)
- Scientific career
- Fields: Biochemistry
- Workplaces: Karolinska Institute
- Doctoral advisor: Einar Hammarsten

Johan Erik Jorpes (born Johansson, 15 July 1894 – 10 July 1973) was a Finnish-born Swedish physician and biochemist. He identified the chemical structure of heparin and developed its clinical applications. Jorpes was the professor of medical chemistry in the Karolinska Institute in Stockholm in 1946–1963.

== Early life ==
Erik Jorpes was born as Johan Erik Johansson to a poor fisherman's family in the village of Överboda in Kökar in Åland. The family lived in a house called Jorpes, which he later adopted as his last name to replace the patronyme Johansson. After the primary school, his parents send the talented kid to high school in Turku. Other students of the Swedish-language school Svenska klassiska lyceum came mostly from wealthy upper-class families, Jorpes was bullied of his social status and dialect. As a result, Jorpes got interested in socialist ideas in the early 1910s. He joined the local Social Democratic student organization and wrote marxist articles to the newspaper Arbetet.

Jorpes graduated in 1914 and entered the University of Helsinki to become a doctor, although his parents wished him a priest. Jorpes finished his medical studies on 30 January 1918, just a few days after the outbreak of the Finnish Civil War. Jorpes did not support the idea of an armed revolution, but joined the Red Guards medical staff as he saw it was his duty to help the wounded. After the Battle of Tampere on 6 April, tens of thousands of Red refugees fled from the western parts of Red Finland. Jorpes and his patients were evacuated from Turku to the eastern Finnish town of Viipuri. They were soon transported to Soviet Russia, and finally Jorpes ended up working as a doctor in the Buy refugee camp, set for the Finnish Reds in the Kostroma Governorate. In August 1918, Jorpes attended the founding congress of the exile Communist Party of Finland in Moscow.

As the Buy camp was disbanded in early 1919, Jorpes was offered a job in Saint Petersburg but he wanted to leave Russia and emigrate Sweden as a political refugee because the former Reds were prisoned in Finland. In the fall of 1919, Jorpes sneaked across the border to Finland and took a train to Turku. Jorpes was able to successfully enter Finland by wearing a bowler hat, something no one could imagine Jorpes wearing. Jorpes was then shipped to his parents home in Kökar by local fishermen who soon smuggled him to Vaxholm in Sweden. The fisherman who smuggled Jorpes were fined later for helping a criminal escape. The police visited the family a day after Jorpes had left.

== Life in Sweden ==
Jorpes arrived Stockholm in October 1919. He had no money, but managed to find a place to live and with the help of the prominent Social Democrat politician Hjalmar Branting, Jorpes was able to continue his medical studies in the Karolinska Institute. after promising to quit the politics. In 1923, Jorpes was granted the Swedish citizenship. Three years later he was appointed assistant professor in the Department of Chemistry and Pharmacology, and in 1946 Jorpes was named the professor of medical chemistry. Jorpes retired in 1963 and continued as a professor emeritus until his death in 1973. In 1949–1951, Jorpes and his predecessor, the professor Einar Hammarsten had a major influence on the architectural design of the building of chemistry of the Karolinska Institute Campus in Solna. The drawings were originally made in 1937 by the architect Tore Rydberg but the construction was postponed due to the World War II.

His first research involved pancreatic nucleic acids. Jorpes completed his German dissertation Über Pentosennucleinsäuren im Tierorganismus unter besonderer Berücksichtigung der Pancreasnucleinsäuren in 1928. After earning his doctorate, Jorpes received a scholarship from the Rockefeller Foundation and spent the academic year 1928–1929 in the Rockefeller University in New York City. He also visited the University of Toronto, where Jorpes studied the preparation of insulin in the Connaught Laboratories under the guidance of the Nobel-winning biochemists Frederick Banting and John Macleod. After returning Sweden, Jorpes launched the production of insulin in the laboratory of the pharmaceutical company Vitrum AB. The royalties soon made him a multimillionaire, but Jorpes gave most of his income to academic research or charity.

In the early 1930s, Jorpes started his pioneering work on the isolation and structure of heparin. In 1936, he successfully purified heparin and subsequently demonstrated that it was localized in the mast cells of tissues. In the same year, Jorpes and the surgeon Clarence Crafoord used heparin to prevent postoperative thrombosis. Crafoord later confirmed the usefulness of heparin in treating thrombosis. Jorpes' classic study on the use of heparin in the treatment of thrombosis was published in 1946. Since the 1940s, Jorpes participated in studies on fibrinogen, factor VIII, plasminogen, prothrombin and thrombin. He also worked on von Willebrand disease with Erik Adolf von Willebrand. In 1961, Jorpes and the docent Viktor Mutt isolated the hormone secretin.

Jorpes was known as a strong personality. There was often tensions between Jorpes and his students and colleagues. He was also a workaholic who enjoyed his time in the laboratory. In 1952, Jorpes was a nominee for the Nobel Prize in Physiology or Medicine jointly with K.P.Link. In 1945, he became a member of the Royal Swedish Academy of Sciences. In 1968, Jorpes received the honorary doctorate of Åbo Akademi in Turku, Finland. During his late years, Jorpes translated Russian literature to Swedish, wrote biographies of Nobel-awarded scientists, and published popular science articles in the Social Democratic newspaper Arbetarbladet.

In 1994, Åland released a set of stamps, one of which honored Erik Jorpes and his contribution to heparin.

== Personal life ==
Erik Jorpes was married with Ida Elvira Ståhl (1896–1976) in 1930. Ida was a domestic science teacher when she met Jorpes. She was said to be a loving wife and tried her best to spoil her husband despite him always being at work. They had two children, daughter Birgitta and son Per, born in 1933 and 1935.

Jorpes was a biography author, and wrote multiple biographies over famous chemists. His most well known biography was written over Swedish chemist Jöns Berzelius, whom Jorpes wrote about in 1960. He also helped to redesign the Berzelius museum in his free time in the 1970s. He also wrote biographies on chemists Alexander Schmidt, Alfred Nobel, and Carl Linnæus.

Jorpes often took his family on summer holiday to their vacation house on Runmarö, a Stockholm island, where he would to teach his sons about the birds, flowers, and fish on the island. Jorpes and his wife are buried on Runmarö.

== Literature ==
- Backman, Runar (1985). Erik Jorpes: Kökar–Moskva–Stockholm (in Swedish). Helsingfors: Söderströms. ISBN 951-52-1023-2.
