= René Binet (translator) =

French translator

René Binet (1731 – 1812) was a French professor and translator. He was born near Beauvais and became professor of rhetoric at the collège du Plessis, rector of the University of Paris in 1791, then proviseur (director) of the lycée Bonaparte.

== Traductions ==
From the Latin

- Horace : Œuvres (1783)
- Valerius Maximus : Œuvres (2 volumes, 1795)
- Virgil : Œuvres (4 volumes, 1803–1804)

From the German

- Christoph Meiners : Histoire de la décadence des mœurs chez les Romains et de ses effets dans les derniers tems de la République (1794)
