= Léon Binet =

French physician

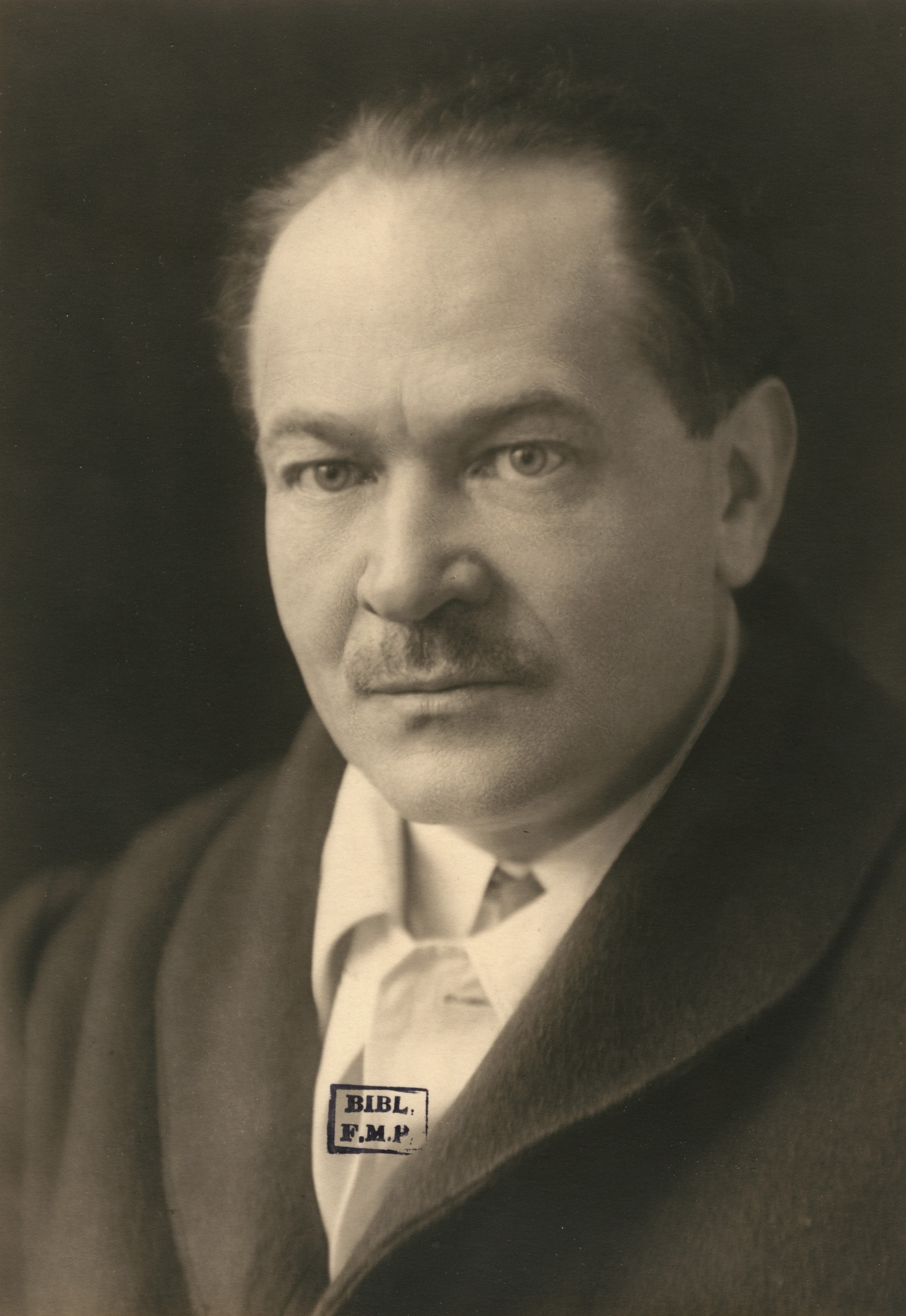
Léon Binet

Léon Binet (11 October 1891, in Beauchery-Saint-Martin – 10 July 1971, in Paris) was a prominent French physician, member of the Académie Nationale de Médecine, and president of the French Academy of Sciences in 1957.

With Henri Roger (1860–1946), he published the 12-volume Traité de physiologie normale et pathologique (1926–40).
