= Adolfo Ferrata =

Italian pathologist and hematologist

Adolfo Ferrata (26 April 1880 in Brescia – 9 March 1946) was an Italian pathologist and hematologist.

In 1904 he earned his medical degree from the University of Parma, spending the following years performing scientific research in clinics at Parma, Berlin and Naples. From 1921 to 1924 he was a professor of special medical pathology at the Universities of Messina and Siena, afterwards serving as a professor of clinical medicine at the University of Pavia, a position he kept for the remainder of his career.

Among his contributions to medical science are investigations on the structure and embryology of the kidney, research on the morphology of intestinal villi and haematopoietic studies in normal and pathological conditions. In his research of haematopoiesis, Ferrata helped demonstrate the systemic nature of leukemia, leading him to support an hypothesis that elements of the blood (erythrocytes, leukocytes, and blood platelets) all originate from the hemocytoblast, a direct descendant of a mesenchymal cell, which he referred to as an emoistioblasto (hemohistioblast).

In 1907 he was the first scientist to show that the complement could be split into two components that were singularly inactive, only regaining their activity when reunited.

In 1920 Ferrata founded the journal "Haematologica".

== Associated eponym ==
- "Ferrata cell": A primordial mesenchymal cell, also known as an hemohistioblast (hematohistioblast).
