= List of honorary fellows of the Royal Society of Chemistry =

The Royal Society of Chemistry awards the designation of Honorary Fellow of the Royal Society of Chemistry for distinguished service in the field of chemistry.

Awardees are entitled to use the post nominal HonFRSC.

== Recipients ==
Recipients have included:

=== 1952 ===
- HRH The Prince Philip, Duke of Edinburgh KG KT OM GBE HonFRSC

=== 1979 ===
- Margaret Thatcher, Baroness Thatcher LG OM DStJ PC FRS HonFRSC

=== 1980 ===
- Professor Elias J Corey HonFRSC ForMemRS
- Professor Manfred Eigen HonFRSC HonFRSE ForMemRS
- Professor Albert Eschenmoser HonFRSC ForMemRS
- Professor Rolf Huisgen HonFRSC
- Professor Dr Heinrich Noth HonFRSC

=== 1983 ===
- Professor Gilbert Stork HonFRSC ForMemRS

=== 1985 ===
- Professor Duilio G Arigoni HonFRSC ForMemRS
- Dr Reuben S Leach HonFRSC
- Professor Riley Schaeffer HonFRSC
- Sir Peter Walters HonFRSC

=== 1986 ===
- Princess Chulabhorn CChem HonFRSC

=== 1987 ===
- Professor Jack Halpern HonFRSC FRS
- Professor Dudley R Herschbach HonFRSC
- Professor Jean-Marie Lehn HonFRSC ForMemRS
- Sir Robert Malpas CBE HonFRSC

=== 1989 ===
- Professor Chintamani N R Rao CChem HonFRSC FRS

=== 1990 ===
- Dr Alfred R. Bader HonFRSC
- Dr Wolfgang Fritsche CChem HonFRSC
- Professor Corwin H Hansch HonFRSC (1918–2011)
- Professor Rudolf A Marcus HonFRSC
- Professor Federico Mayor Zaragoza HonFRSC
- Professor Oleg M Nefedov HonFRSC
- Professor John C Polanyi HonFRSC FRS

=== 1993 ===
- Miss Helen P Sharman OBE CChem HonFRSC

=== 1994 ===
- Dr Mary L Good CChem HonFRSC

=== 1995 ===
- Professor Roald Hoffmann HonFRSC ForMemRS

=== 1996 ===
- Professor Ronald C D Breslow HonFRSC FRS
- Professor Walter Kaminsky HonFRSC

=== 1997 ===
- Professor Karl B Sharpless HonFRSC

=== 1998 ===
- Professor Sir John Ivan George Cadogan CBE CChem HonFRSC FRSE FRS
- Sir Aaron Klug OM PRS HonFRSC HonFRSE FRS
- Professor George A Olah HonFRSC FRS
- Sir Richard Brook Sykes HonFRSC FRS
- Professor Sir John Walker HonFRSC FRS

=== 2000 ===
- Professor Jack David Dunitz HonFRSC FRS
- Professor Sir Harry Kroto CChem HonFRSC HonFRSE FRS
- Professor Ryoji Noyori HonFRSC ForMemRS

=== 2001 ===
- The Lord Browne of Madingley HonFRSC FRS
- Professor Richard N Zare HonFRSC ForMemRS

=== 2002 ===
- Professor Henri B Kagan HonFRSC
- Sir Thomas Fulton Wilson McKillop HonFRSC FRSE FRS
- Professor Sir John Edward Sulston HonFRSC FRS
- Professor Kurt Wuthrich HonFRSC HonFRSE ForMemRS
- Professor Ahmed Hassan Zewail HonFRSC ForMemRS

Also in 2002, the fictional character Sherlock Holmes was awarded an "Extraordinary Honorary Fellowship".

=== 2003 ===
- Professor Sir Richard Friend HonFRSC FRS
- Professor Sir Peter Mansfield HonFRSC FRS

=== 2004 ===
- Dr Peter Agre HonFRSC
- Professor Aaron Ciechanover HonFRSC
- Professor Harry Barkus Gray HonFRSC ForMemRS
- Professor Avram Hershko HonFRSC
- Professor Roderick MacKinnon HonFRSC
- Professor Irwin Rose HonFRSC (1926–2015)

=== 2005 ===
- Mr Heston Blumenthal OBE HonFRSC
- Dr Yves Chauvin HonFRSC
- Professor Robert H Grubbs HonFRSC
- Professor Satoshi Omura HonFRSC
- Professor Richard Royce Schrock HonFRSC ForMemRS
- Professor George M Whitesides HonFRSC

=== 2006 ===
- Dr Adam Hart-Davis HonFRSC
- Professor Roger D Kornberg HonFRSC FRS
- Professor Goverdhan Mehta CChem HonFRSC FRS
- Professor Teruaki Mukaiyama HonFRSC
- Professor Herbert Roesky HonFRSC
- The Lord Sainsbury of Turville HonFRSC FRS

=== 2007 ===
- Professor Chunli Bai HonFRSC
- Professor Carl Djerassi HonFRSC ForMemRS (1923–2015)
- Professor Gerhard Ertl HonFRSC HonFRSE
- Professor Dieter Fenske HonFRSC

=== 2008 ===
- Professor Martin Chalfie HonFRSC
- Professor Roger Yonchien Tsien HonFRSC ForMemRS

=== 2009 ===
- Professor Christian André Amatore HonFRSC
- Professor Allen Joseph Bard HonFRSC
- Dr Brian Iddon CChem HonFRSC
- Dr Venkatraman Ramakrishnan HonFRSC FRS
- Professor Thomas Arthur Steitz HonFRSC
- Professor Ada E Yonath HonFRSC

=== 2010 ===
- Mr Bill Bryson OBE HonFRSC
- Professor Andre Geim HonFRSC FRS
- Professor Sir Alec Jeffreys HonFRSC FRS
- Professor Ei-ichi Negishi HonFRSC
- Professor Konstantin Novoselov HonFRSC
- Professor Sir Paul Nurse HonFRSC FRSE FRS
- Professor Akira Suzuki HonFRSC

=== 2011 ===
- Dr Quentin Cooper HonFRSC
- Dr Yusuf Khwaja Hamied HonFRSC
- Dr Yuan Tseh Lee HonFRSC
- Professor Dan Shechtman HonFRSC
- Sir J Fraser Stoddart CChem HonFRSC HonFRSE FRS
- Dr Joan Selverstone Valentine HonFRSC

=== 2012 ===
- Professor Brian Kobilka HonFRSC
- Professor Robert J Lefkowitz HonFRSC
- Sir Gregory P Winter CBE HonFRSC FRS

=== 2013 ===
- The Lord Ballyedmond OBE, HonFRSC, FRCVS (1944–2014)
- Professor Michael Grätzel HonFRSC
- Professor Anne Glover CBE HonFRSC
- Professor Dame Julia S Higgins DBE HonFRSC FRS
- Professor Andrew B Holmes HonFRSC FRS
- Professor Martin Karplus HonFRSC
- Professor Michael Levitt HonFRSC FRS
- Professor Arieh Warshel HonFRSC
- Mr Keith Wiggins HonFRSC

=== 2014 ===
- Professor Jacqueline Barton HonFRSC
- Dr Eric Betzig HonFRSC
- Professor Dr Stefan Hell HonFRSC
- Professor William Moerner HonFRSC
- Professor Bengt Norden HonFRSC
- Professor Sir Martyn Poliakoff CBE HonFRSC FRS
- Professor Dame Julia Slingo HonFRSC
- Professor Gabor Somorjai HonFRSC

=== 2015 ===
- Professor Andrew D Hamilton HonFRSC FRS
- Dr Tomas R Lindahl HonFRSC
- Dr Paul L Modrich HonFRSC
- Professor Dame Carol V Robinson DBE HonFRSC FRS
- Professor Lesley J Yellowlees CBE HonFRSC FRSE

=== 2016 ===
- Professor Jean-Pierre Sauvage HonFRSC
- Professor Dr Bernard L Feringa CChem HonFRSC
- Professor Dr Xinhe Bao HonFRSC
- Professor Christina Moberg HonFRSC
- Professor Dame Janet Thornton DBE HonFRSC FRS

=== 2017 ===
- Professor Jacques Dubochet HonFRSC
- Dr Joachim Frank HonFRSC
- Professor Richard Henderson HonFRSC FRS
- Professor Thisbe Lindhorst HonFRSC
- Prof Dr Michael Elias Pfändler Hoffmann HonFRSC
- Professor Yuri Tsolakovich Oganessian HonFRSC
- Professor W Graham Richards CBE HonFRSC
- The Lord Willetts HonFRSC
- Ms Emma Walmsley HonFRSC

=== 2018 ===
- Professor Juliet Gerrard HonFRSC FRSNZ
- Dr Maki Kawai HonFRSC
- Dr Fiona Marshall HonFRSC
- Professor Roger Sheldon HonFRSC FRS

=== 2019 ===
- Professor Frances Arnold HonFRSC
- Professor Dr Natalia Tarasova HonFRSC
- Dr Anthony Wood HonFRSC
- Professor John B. Goodenough CChem HonFRSC ForMemRS

=== 2020 ===
- Professor Emmanuel I Iwuoha CSci CChem HonFRSC
- Professor Pilar Goya Laza HonFRSC
- Professor Tebello Nyokong HonFRSC

=== 2021 ===
- Dr Nigist Asfaw HonFRSC
- Dr Audrey M Cameron OBE CChem HonFRSC
- Professor Steven V Ley CBE CChem HonFRSC FRS

=== 2022 ===
- Charlotte Allerton HonFRSC
- Professor Dame Athene Donald DBE HonFRSC FRS
- Professor Ijeoma Uchegbu HonFRSC FMedSci

=== 2024 ===
- Richard Catlow
- David Cole-Hamilton
- Mama El Rhazi
- Javier García Martinez
- Patrick Vallance
- Pernilla Wittung-Stafshede

=== 2025 ===
- Carolyn Bertozzi
- Dame Margaret Brimble
- Professor Kelly Chibale
- Dame Clare Grey
- Sir Demis Hassabis
- Sir David MacMillan
- Jane Catherine Ngila

== See also ==
- List of Royal Society of Chemistry medals and awards
