= Nordling =

Nordling is a Swedish surname.

== Geographical distribution ==
As of 2014, 45.0% of all known bearers of the surname Nordling were residents of Sweden (frequency 1:8,199), 32.1% of the United States (1:421,039), 16.5% of Finland (1:12,464), 1.6% of Denmark (1:131,268), 1.6% of Norway (1:119,589) and 1.3% of Australia (1:660,385).

In Sweden, the frequency of the surname was higher than national average (1:8,199) in the following counties:

1. Västernorrland County (1:2,440)
2. Värmland County (1:2,983)
3. Uppsala County (1:3,463)
4. Gotland County (1:4,177)
5. Gävleborg County (1:5,284)
6. Södermanland County (1:5,584)
7. Stockholm County (1:6,989)
8. Dalarna County (1:7,995)
9. Blekinge County (1:8,102)
10. Örebro County (1:8,149)

In Finland, the frequency of the surname was higher than national average (1:12,464) in the following regions:

1. Ostrobothnia (1:2,594)
2. Åland (1:3,229)
3. Satakunta (1:3,812)
4. Southwest Finland (1:6,012)
5. Uusimaa (1:8,890)

== Notable people ==
- Carl O. Nordling (1919–2007), Finland-Swedish architect and statistician
- Carl Nordling, former chairman of the Nobel Committee for Physics
- Frans Hjalmar Nordling (1890–1931), Fennicized as Nortamo, Finnish writer and doctor
- Jeffrey Nordling (b. 1962), American actor
- Raoul Nordling, Swedish consul general in Paris during World War II
- Alan Nordling, MLA for Yukon Territory from Porter Creek South
