= Nobel Committee for Physics =

Prize committee

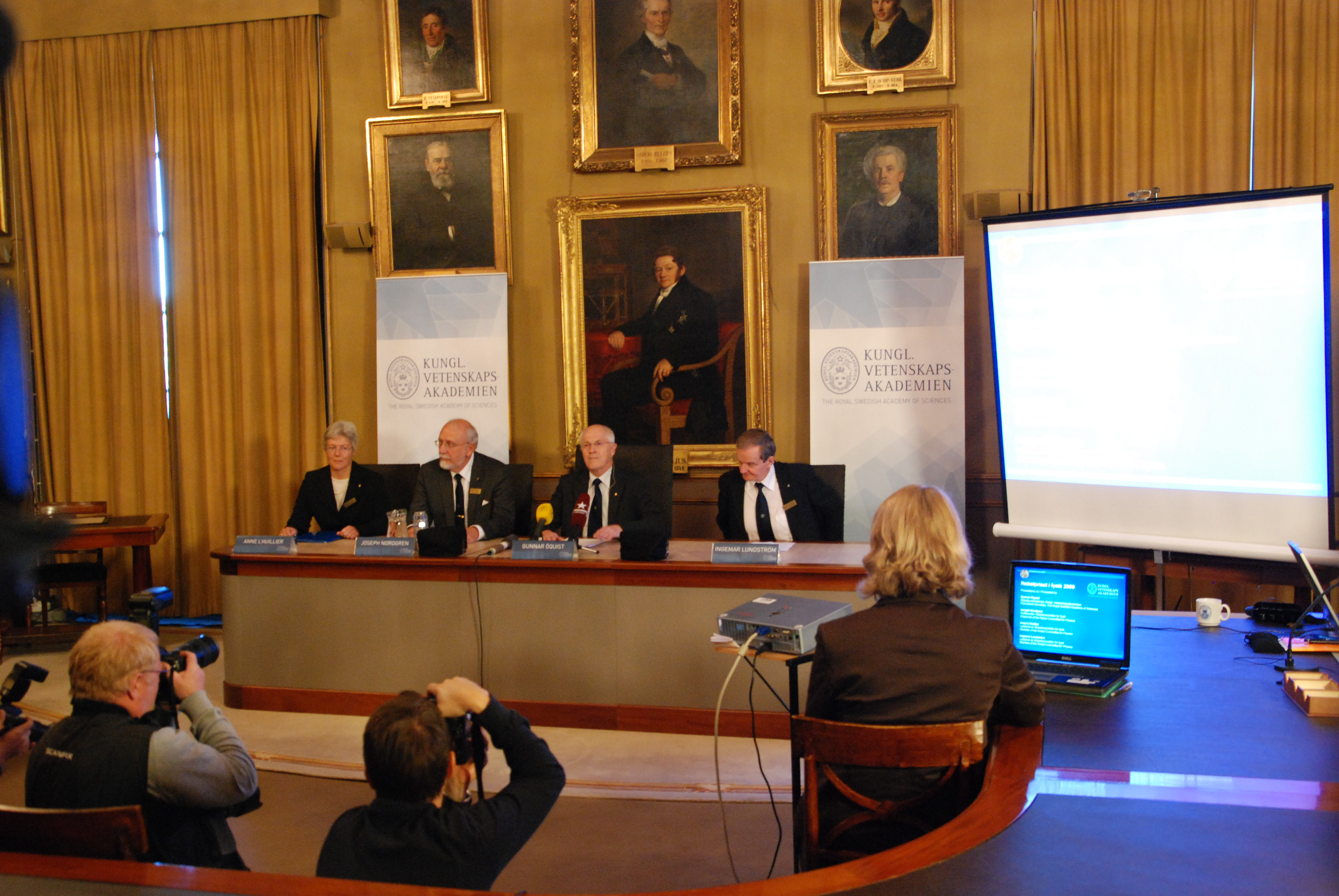
Announcement of the Nobel Prize for Physics 2009. From left Anne L'Huillier, Joseph Nordgren, Gunnar Öquist and Ingemar Lundström.

The Nobel Committee for Physics is the Nobel Committee responsible for proposing laureates for the Nobel Prize for Physics. The Nobel Committee for Physics is appointed by the Royal Swedish Academy of Sciences. It usually consists of Swedish professors of physics who are members of the academy, although the academy in principle could appoint anyone to the committee.

The committee is a working body without decision power, and the final decision to award the Nobel Prize for Physics is taken by the entire Royal Swedish Academy of Sciences, after having a first discussion in the academy's Class for Physics.

== Current members ==
The members of the committee (as of 2023) are:

- Ulf Danielsson (Secretary)
- David Haviland
- Anders Irbäck
- Eva Olsson (chair)
- John Wettlaufer
- Ellen Moons

=== Co-opted members ===
- Mats Larsson
- Olle Eriksson
- Göran Johansson
- Mark Pearce

== Secretary ==
The secretary takes part in the meeting, but cannot cast a vote unless the secretary is also a member of the committee. Until 1973, the Nobel Committees for Physics and Chemistry had a common secretary.

- Wilhelm Palmær, 1900–1926
- Arne Westgren, 1926–1943
- Arne Ölander, 1943–1965
- Arne Magnéli, 1966–1973
- Bengt Nagel, 1974–1988
- Anders Bárány, 1989–2003
- Lars Bergström, 2004–2015
- Gunnar Ingelman, 2016–present

== Former members ==
- Hugo Hildebrand Hildebrandsson, 1900–1910
- Robert Thalén, 1900–1903
- Klas Bernhard Hasselberg, 1900–1922
- Knut Ångström, 1900–1909
- Svante Arrhenius, 1900–1927
- Gustaf Granqvist, 1904–1922
- Vilhelm Carlheim-Gyllensköld, 1910–1934
- Allvar Gullstrand, 1911–1929
- Carl Wilhelm Oseen, 1923–1944
- Manne Siegbahn, 1923–1961 (chairman ?–1957)
- Henning Pleijel, 1928–1947
- Erik Hulthén, 1929–1962 (chairman 1958–1962)
- Axel E. Lindh, 1935–1960
- Ivar Waller, 1945–1972
- Gustaf Ising, 1947–1953
- Oskar Klein, 1954–1965
- Bengt Edlén, 1961–1976
- Erik Rudberg, 1963–1972 (chairman 1963–1972)
- Kai Siegbahn, 1963–1974 (chairman 1973–1974)
- Lamek Hulthén, 1966–1979 (chairman 1975–1979)
- Per-Olov Löwdin, 1972–1984
- A.M. Harun-ar-Rashid, 1972, 1986, 1993
- Stig Lundqvist, 1973–1985 (chairman 1980–1985)
- Sven Johansson, 1975–1986 (chairman 1986)
- Gösta Ekspong, 1975–1988 (chairman 1987–1988)
- Ingvar Lindgren, 1978–1991 (chairman 1989–1991)
- Carl Nordling, 1985–1997 (chairman 1992–1995)
- Bengt Nagel, 1986–1997
- Erik Karlsson, 1987–1998 (chairman 1997–1998)
- Cecilia Jarlskog, 1989–2000 (chairman 1999–2000)
- Tord Claeson, 1992–2000
- Mats Jonson, 1997–2005
- Sune Svanberg, 1998–2006
- Per Carlson, 1999–2007
- Lennart Stenflo, 2001–2006
- Joseph Nordgren, 2001–2009 (chairman 2008–2009)
- Ingemar Lundström, 2006–? (chairman 2010–?)
- Anne L'Huillier, 2007–2015
- Börje Johansson, 2007–?
- Lars Brink, 2008–?
- Björn Jonson, 2006–present
- Per Delsing, 2007–2015
- Olle Inganäs, 2012–2016
- Nils Mårtensson, around 2017 (chair)
- Olga Botner, 2010–2018
