= Nobel Committee for Chemistry =

Awarding committee for the Nobel Prize in Chemistry

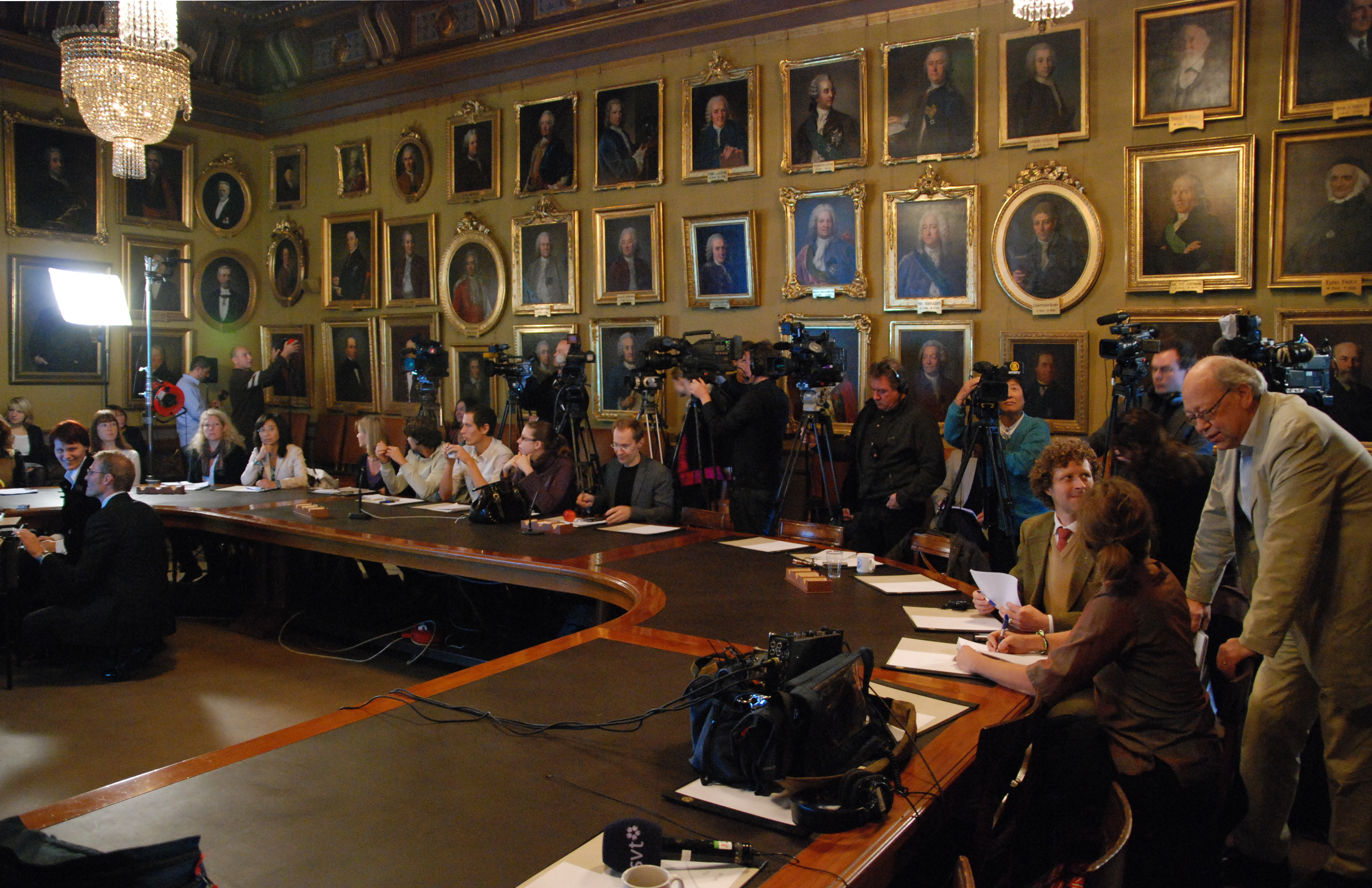
Announcement of the Nobel Prize for Chemistry 2008.

The Nobel Committee for Chemistry is the Nobel Committee responsible for proposing laureates for the Nobel Prize in Chemistry. The Nobel Committee for Chemistry is appointed by the Royal Swedish Academy of Sciences. It usually consists of Swedish professors of chemistry who are members of the Academy, although the Academy in principle could appoint anyone to the Committee.

The Committee is a working body without decision power, and the final decision to award the Nobel Prize for Chemistry is taken by the entire Royal Swedish Academy of Sciences, after having a first discussion in the Academy's Class for Chemistry.

== Current members ==
The current members of the Committee are:

- Johan Åqvist, Chairman
- Peter Brzezinski, also Secretary
- Claes Gustafsson
- Heiner Linke
- Olof Ramström
- Peter Somfai
- Pernilla Wittung Stafshede (co-opted member)
- Xiaodong Zou

== Secretary ==
The secretary takes part in the Committee meetings, but can not cast a vote unless the secretary is also a member of the Committee. Until 1973 the Nobel Committees for Physics and Chemistry had a common secretary.

- Arne Westgren (1926–1943)
- Arne Ölander (1943–1965)
- Arne Magnéli (1966–1986)
- Peder Kierkegaard (1987–1995)
- Astrid Gräslund (1996–, also member 2010–)
- Gunnar von Heijne (2015–2020, also member 2001–2009 (chair 2007–2009))
- Peter Brzezinski (2021-)

== Former members ==
- Oskar Widman, 1900–1928
- Per Teodor Cleve, 1900–1905
- Otto Pettersson, 1900–1912
- Johan Peter Klason, 1900–1925
- Henrik Gustaf Söderbaum, 1900–1933
- Olof Hammarsten, 1905–1926
- Åke Gerhard Ekstrand, 1913–1924
- The Svedberg, 1925–1964
- Wilhelm Palmær, 1926–1942
- Ludvig Ramberg, 1927–1940
- Hans von Euler-Chelpin, 1929–1946
- Bror Holmberg, 1934–1953
- Arne Westgren, 1942–1964 (chairman 1944-1964)
- Arne Fredga, 1944–1975 (chairman 1972-1975)
- Arne Tiselius, 1947–1971 (chairman 1965-1971)
- Karl Myrbäck, 1954–1975
- Gunnar Hägg, 1965–1976 (chairman 1976)
- Arne Ölander, 1965–1974
- Einar Stenhagen, 1972–1973
- Bo G. Malmström, 1973–1988 (chairman 1977-1988)
- Göran Bergson, 1974–1984
- Børge Bak, 1974–?
- Stig Claesson, 1975–1983
- Bengt Lindberg, 1976–?
- Lars Ernster, 1977–1988
- Sture Forsén, 1983–1995
- Ingvar Lindqvist, 1986–? (associate 1985)
- Björn Roos, 1988–2000 (associate 1986-1987)
- Salo Gronowitz, 1988–1996 (associate 1986-1987, chairman 1991-1996)
- Bertil Andersson, 1989–1997
- Carl-Ivar Brändén, 1990–2000
- Lennart Eberson, 1995–? (associate -1994, chairman 1997-)
- Ingmar Grenthe, 1999–? (associate -1995)
- Torvard C. Laurent, 1996–1998 (associate 1992-1995)
- Bengt Nordén, 1995–2004 (chairman 2000-2003)
- Gunnar von Heijne, 2001-2009 (chairman 2007-2009)
- Håkan Wennerström, 2001-2009
