= John Wettlaufer =

American physicist and applied mathematician

John S. Wettlaufer
- Citizenship: American
- Education: University of Puget Sound (B.S., 1985); University of Washington (Ph.D., 1991)
- Awards: Fellow of the American Physical Society (2003); Guggenheim Fellowship (2010); Foreign Member, Royal Swedish Academy of Sciences (2015); Fellow of the American Geophysical Union (2019); SIAM Fellow (2023)
- Scientific career
- Fields: Statistical physics; Soft condensed matter; Geophysics; Applied mathematics
- Workplaces: Yale University; Stockholm University; Nordita; University of Oxford; University of Washington
- Thesis: The Directional Solidification of Salt Water (1991)
- Doctoral advisors: Norbert Untersteiner; J. Gregory Dash; Michael Schick

John S. Wettlaufer is an American physicist and applied mathematician. He is the A. M. Bateman Professor of Geophysics, Mathematics, and Physics at Yale University, in the Departments of Earth and Planetary Sciences, Mathematics and Physics. He is also research professor of applied mathematics and theoretical physics at the Nordic Institute for Theoretical Physics (Nordita) and Stockholm University.

Wettlaufer's research areas include interfacial premelting, frost heaving, the growth of sea ice, glacier flow, ice in the atmosphere, ancient ice climate records, Arctic climate dynamics, capillarity in soft elastic solids, mushy layer convection, and stochastic methods applied to fluid dynamics, convection, and astrophysics.

He is a fellow of the American Physical Society (2003), a Guggenheim fellow (2010), a foreign member of the Royal Swedish Academy of Sciences (Class for Physics, 2015), a fellow of the American Geophysical Union (2019), and a fellow of the Society for Industrial and Applied Mathematics (2023). He has been a member of the Nobel Committee for Physics since 2021.

== Education ==
Wettlaufer received a B.S. with Honors in mathematics and physics from the University of Puget Sound in 1985, and a Ph.D. from the University of Washington in 1991. His dissertation, The Directional Solidification of Salt Water, was supervised by Norbert Untersteiner, J. Gregory Dash, and Michael Schick.

== Career ==
Wettlaufer's primary appointment has been at Yale University since 2002, with concurrent affiliations at the University of Oxford from 2010 to 2018 and at Nordita and Stockholm University since 2014.

From 1991 to 2001, Wettlaufer held postdoctoral and faculty positions at the University of Washington, with appointments in the Department of Physics and at the Applied Physics Laboratory, and took part in field measurements on Arctic pack ice. He moved to Yale University in 2002 as professor of geophysics and physics and fellow of Silliman College. In 2008 he was elected the A. M. Bateman Professor of Geophysics, with joint appointments as professor of mathematics and professor of physics.

Wettlaufer was a visiting professorial fellow at the Oxford Centre for Collaborative Applied Mathematics (OCCAM) from 2010 to 2011. From 2013 to 2014 he was professor of applicable mathematics at the Mathematical Institute, University of Oxford and senior research fellow in mathematics at Jesus College, Oxford, and held a visiting professorship of mathematics at Oxford from 2014 to 2018. His Nordita and Stockholm appointment, established through an international recruitment funded by the Swedish Research Council, began in November 2014. He was the Tage Erlander Professor at Nordita in 2012, and a visiting professor at Nordita in the autumn semesters of 2008 and 2011.

Other visiting appointments include the Houghton Lecturer at the Massachusetts Institute of Technology (MIT) in 2007, visiting fellow commoner of Trinity College, Cambridge in 2005, and a Japan Society for the Promotion of Science (JSPS) visiting professor at Hokkaido University in 1999.

== Research ==
Wettlaufer's research uses methods from non-equilibrium statistical physics, soft condensed matter, fluid dynamics, and applied mathematics, including asymptotic analysis, stochastic processes, and numerical simulation.

=== Premelting and ice physics ===
Wettlaufer has worked on interfacial premelting since the 1990s. His work on the topic includes the 1995 Reports on Progress in Physics review with J. G. Dash and H. Y. Fu, the 1996 Physical Review Letters paper on premelting dynamics for arbitrary power-law forces, the 2001 Nature paper on the climate signal in ancient ice, the 2004 Journal of Fluid Mechanics paper on frost heaving, and 2006 reviews with Dash and Rempel in Reviews of Modern Physics and with Worster in the Annual Review of Fluid Mechanics. Related work concerns convection in mushy layers.

=== Ice and climate ===
Wettlaufer's work on ice and climate includes a 1997 Journal of Fluid Mechanics paper modeling brine rejection from sea ice in the framework of mushy layer theory, a 2009 Proceedings of the National Academy of Sciences paper on threshold behavior in Arctic sea ice loss, and a 2015 Physical Review Letters paper on the sea-ice thickness distribution. In Philosophical Transactions of the Royal Society A, Wettlaufer and Woosok Moon introduced the framework of coupling functions in climate.

=== Statistical mechanics and mathematical physics ===
Wettlaufer has developed a general stochastic perturbation theory for non-autonomous systems, and asymptotic methods for solving the Fokker–Planck equations for the survival analysis of non-autonomous Ornstein–Uhlenbeck processes and non-adiabatic stochastic resonance. He has used these and similar approaches to study the thermodynamics of information, the prediction of rare events, the maritime Casimir effect, and non-Markovian first-passage dynamics.

=== Soft matter and surface stresses ===
Wettlaufer's work on capillarity in soft elastic solids includes a 2013 Nature Communications paper on the deformation of soft substrates near a contact line, and a 2015 Nature Physics paper on capillary stiffening of soft solids by liquid inclusions.

=== Stochastic methods, geophysics, and astrophysics ===
Wettlaufer has developed stochastic methods for time series analysis, non-Gaussian stochastic models of the El Niño–Southern Oscillation, Arctic sea ice stability, paleoclimatology, and the detection of exoplanets and stellar spectral features.

=== Hydrodynamics and geophysical fluid dynamics ===
Wettlaufer demonstrated a variational principle for compositional convection during solidification, he has developed an asymptotic framework for wind wave generation and mushy layer convection, theoretical models for jet-stream waviness and the Hadley circulation, and the heat transport scaling laws in turbulent Rayleigh–Bénard convection,.

=== Books ===
Wettlaufer co-edited the volume Ice Physics and the Natural Environment (NATO ASI Series, Springer, 1999) with J. G. Dash and N. Untersteiner.

== Honors ==
- SIAM fellow (2023)
- Member, Nobel Committee for Physics (since 2021)
- Member, Connecticut Academy of Science and Engineering (2021)
- Fellow of the American Geophysical Union (2019)
- Foreign member of the Royal Swedish Academy of Sciences (Class for Physics, 2015)
- Royal Society Wolfson Research Merit Award (2013)
- John Carlson Lecturer, Lorenz Center, MIT (2013)
- Tage Erlander Professor, Swedish Research Council and Nordita (2012)
- John Simon Guggenheim fellow (2010)
- OCCAM visiting fellow, Mathematical Institute, University of Oxford (2010)
- Houghton Lecturer, MIT (2007)
- Visiting fellow commoner, Trinity College, Cambridge (2005)
- Fellow of the American Physical Society (2003)
- JSPS visiting professor, Hokkaido University (1999)
- Research faculty fellowship, University of Washington (1996)
- Sigma Pi Sigma, the American Institute of Physics honor society (1985)

== Service ==
Wettlaufer is an associate editor of the Journal of Fluid Mechanics. At Yale he is the director of undergraduate studies for applied mathematics. He has been a member of the Nobel Committee for Physics since 2021.

== Selected publications ==
- Dash, J. G.; Fu, H.-Y.; Wettlaufer, J. S. (1995). "The premelting of ice and its environmental consequences". Reports on Progress in Physics. 58 (1): 115–167. Bibcode:1995RPPh...58..115D. doi:10.1088/0034-4885/58/1/003.
- Wettlaufer, J. S.; Worster, M. G.; Wilen, L. A.; Dash, J. G. (1996). "A Theory of Premelting Dynamics for All Power Law Forces". Physical Review Letters. 76 (19): 3602–3605. Bibcode:1996PhRvL..76.3602W. doi:10.1103/PhysRevLett.76.3602. PMID 10061009.
- Rempel, A. W.; Wettlaufer, J. S.; Worster, M. G. (2004). "Premelting dynamics in a continuum model of frost heave". Journal of Fluid Mechanics. 498: 227–244. Bibcode:2004JFM...498..227R. doi:10.1017/S0022112003006761.
- Dash, J. G.; Rempel, A. W.; Wettlaufer, J. S. (2006). "The physics of premelted ice and its geophysical consequences". Reviews of Modern Physics. 78 (3): 695–741. Bibcode:2006RvMP...78..695D. doi:10.1103/RevModPhys.78.695.
- Eisenman, I.; Wettlaufer, J. S. (2009). "Nonlinear threshold behavior during the loss of Arctic sea ice". Proceedings of the National Academy of Sciences. 106 (1): 28–32. arXiv:0812.4777. Bibcode:2009PNAS..106...28E. doi:10.1073/pnas.0806887106. PMC 2629232. PMID 19109440.
- Style, R. W.; Hyland, C.; Boltyanskiy, R.; Wettlaufer, J. S.; Dufresne, E. R. (2013). "Universal deformation of soft substrates near a contact line and the direct measurement of solid surface stresses". Nature Communications. 4: 2728. arXiv:1308.1934. Bibcode:2013NatCo...4.2728S. doi:10.1038/ncomms3728. PMID 24201430.
