= Deborah Leckband =

American chemist and academic

Deborah Elaine Leckband
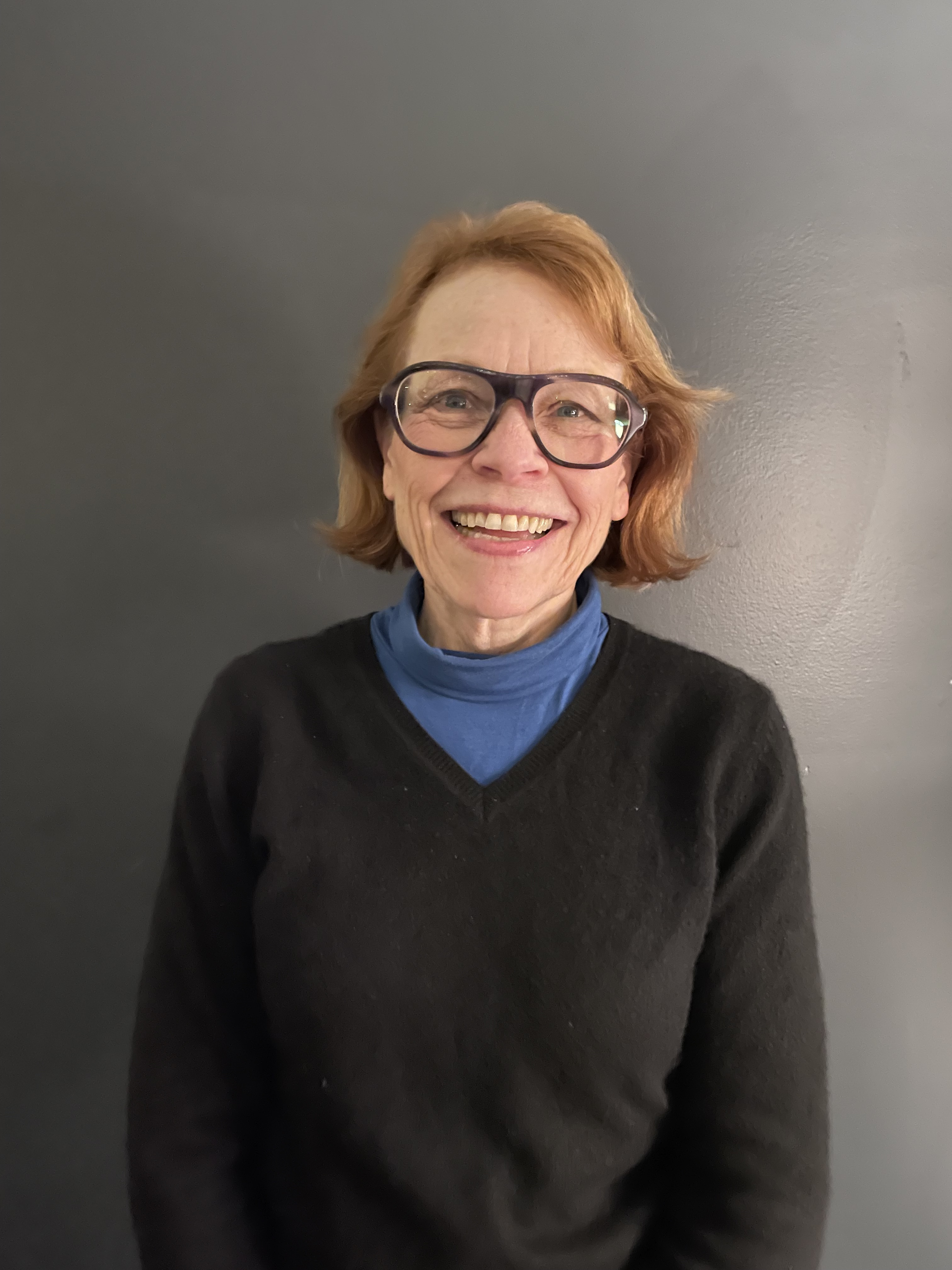
- Deborah Leckband at the 2026 Biophysical Society Meeting
- Born: 1959 (age 66–67)
- Education: Cornell University; Humboldt State University
- Scientific career
- Workplaces: University of Illinois at Urbana-Champaign; Massachusetts Institute of Technology; University of California, Santa Barbara
- Thesis: A kinetic study of nucleotide interactions with chloroplast coupling factor (1988)

Deborah E. Leckband (born May 30, 1959) is an American chemist who is the Reid T. Milner Professor of Chemical and Biomolecular Engineering and Professor of Chemistry. She is also the Biochemistry Director, Bioengineering Graduate Program at the University of Illinois Urbana-Champaign. She investigates biomaterials, tissue engineering and the nano mechanics of biomolecules. She is a Fellow of the American Institute for Medical and Biological Engineering, the American Association for the Advancement of Science, the Biomedical Engineering Society, the American Chemical Society, and the Biophysical Society.

== Early life and education ==
Leckband was born in Urbana, Illinois. She was an undergraduate student at the Humboldt State University in California. She earned a Ph.D. at Cornell University for her research on nucleotide interactions. She then moved to Massachusetts Institute of Technology, where she worked alongside Robert S. Langer on the immobilization of proteins. She was a postdoctoral researcher with Jacob Israelachvili at the University of California, Santa Barbara, during which she became interested in surface science and how it impacts biology and cell adhesion.

== Research and career ==
Leckband joined the faculty of the University of Illinois Urbana-Champaign in 1988. She develops experimental approaches to understand the nanomechanics of biomolecules and cell adhesion. She is particularly interested in surface science in biological systems, and the fundamental mechanisms that drive cell adhesion. These surfaces may include the coatings on drug containers, the surfaces of biosensors and other bioelectronic devices, and contact lenses. She has studied how the physio-chemical properties of surfaces impact biological function. In her research, she has identified new materials for optimized drug delivery and non-fouling contact lenses. She has shown it is possible to engineer "smart" coatings to selectively modify interfacial responses.

Leckband collaborated with Martin Gruebele to understand the stability of proteins in situ at sub-micron resolution. Their research has shown that polymers moderate protein function, which helps to design biomaterials with optimized stability and activity.

Leckband has shown that the velcro-like cadherins are not only involved with holding cells together, but that they perform critical functions when they are under tension. Under tensional stress, the cadherin growth factor interaction is disrupted, which switches on tissue growth signalling pathways.

== Awards and honors ==
- 2004 Britton Chance Distinguished Lecturer
- 2005 Elected Fellow of the American Institute for Medical and Biological Engineering
- 2005 Elected Fellow of the American Association for the Advancement of Science
- 2009 Elected Fellow of the American Chemical Society
- 2014 Elected Fellow of the Biomedical Engineering Society
- 2021 Langmuir Lectureship
- 2026 Fellow of the Biophysical Society

== Selected publications ==
- D. Leckband; J. Israelachvili (2001). "Intermolecular forces in biology". Quarterly Reviews of Biophysics. 34 (2): 105–267. doi:10.1017/s0033583501003687. PMID 11771120. Wikidata Q34480853.
- Quint le Duc; Quanming Shi; Iris Blonk; Arnoud Sonnenberg; Ning Wang; Deborah Leckband; de Rooij, Johan (2010). "Vinculin potentiates E-cadherin mechanosensing and is recruited to actin-anchored sites within adherens junctions in a myosin II-dependent manner". Journal of Cell Biology. 189 (7): 1107–1115. doi:10.1083/jcb.201001149. PMC 2894457. PMID 20584916. Wikidata Q33950292.
- D Leckband (2000). "Measuring the forces that control protein interactions". Annual Review of Biophysics and Biomolecular Structure. 29: 1–26. doi:10.1146/annurev.biophys.29.1.1. PMID 10940241. Wikidata Q30902051.
