= Robert Bárány =

Austria-born otologist (1876–1936)

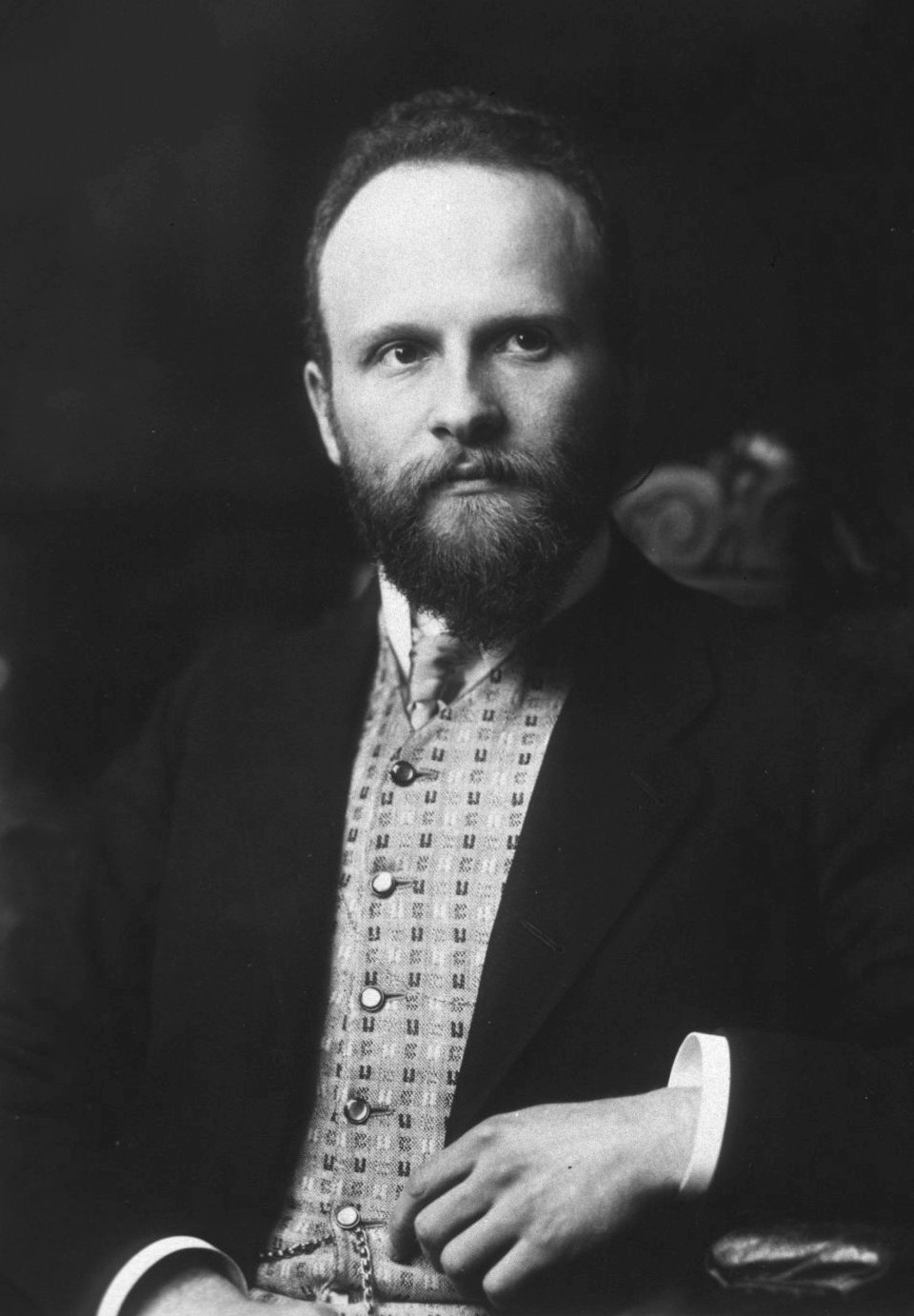
- Born: 22 April 1876; Vienna, Austria-Hungary
- Died: 8 April 1936 (aged 59); Uppsala, Sweden
- Education: University of Vienna (MD)
- Awards: Nobel Prize in Physiology or Medicine (1914)
- Scientific career
- Fields: Medicine
- Workplaces: Uppsala University
- Doctoral students: Gösta Dohlman

Robert Bárány (Hungarian: Bárány Róbert, pronounced [ˈbaːraːɲ ˈroːbɛrt]; 22 April 1876 – 8 April 1936) was an Austrian-born otologist. He received the 1914 Nobel Prize in Physiology or Medicine for his work on the physiology and pathology of the vestibular apparatus.

== Life and career ==
Bárány was born in Vienna, Austria-Hungary. He was the eldest of six children of Maria (née Hock), the daughter of a scientist, and Ignác Bárány, born 1842 in Várpalota, Kingdom of Hungary, who was a bank official and estate manager. His father was a Hungarian Jew whose father also was named Ignác Bárány (Bárány Ignác).

He attended medical school at Vienna University, graduating in 1900. As a doctor in Vienna, Bárány was syringing fluid into the external auditory canal of a patient to relieve the patient's dizzy spells. The patient experienced vertigo and nystagmus (involuntary eye movement) when Bárány injected fluid that was too cold. In response, Bárány warmed the fluid for the patient and the patient experienced nystagmus in the opposite direction. Bárány theorized that the endolymph was sinking when it was cool and rising when it was warm, and thus the direction of flow of the endolymph was providing the proprioceptive signal to the vestibular organ. He followed up on this observation with a series of experiments on what he called the caloric reaction. The research resulting from his observations made surgical treatment of vestibular organ diseases possible. Bárány also investigated other aspects of equilibrium control, including the function of the cerebellum. Benign paroxysmal positional vertigo is said to have been first described in medical texts by Bárány.

He served in the Austro-Hungarian Army during World War I as a civilian surgeon and was captured by the Imperial Russian Army. When his Nobel Prize was awarded in 1914, Bárány was in a Russian prisoner of war camp. Bárány was released from the prisoner of war camp in 1916 following joint diplomatic efforts from Sweden, Denmark, Norway and The Netherlands and alongside Red Cross. That work was largely driven by the professor of otorhinolaryngology, Nils Gunnar Holmgren, with diplomatic contributions by Prince Carl of Sweden and Norway. Bárány was then able to attend the Nobel Prize awards ceremony in 1916, where he was awarded his prize. Virtually as soon as he was awarded the Nobel Prize, in January 1917, he, with the automatic qualification for making such proposals that comes with being a Prize Winner, proposed to the Nobel Committee in Physiology or Medicine that Sigmund Freud should be awarded the Prize. Freud was annoyed both by Bárány's winning and nominating. In response to his receiving the prize, Sigmund Freud wrote : "The granting of the Nobel Prize to Bárány, whom I refused to take as a pupil some years ago because he seemed to be too abnormal, has aroused sad thoughts about how helpless an individual is about gaining the respect of the crowd." "You know it is only the money that would matter to me, and perhaps the spice of annoying some of my compatriots. But it would be ridiculous to expect a sign of recognition when one has seven-eights of the world against one."

From 1917 until his death, Bárány was professor at Uppsala University Faculty of Medicine. He died shortly before his sixtieth birthday in Uppsala. He was the father of physician and Swedish Royal Academy of Sciences member Ernst Bárány (1910–1991) and grandfather of physicist Anders Bárány, former secretary of the Nobel Committee for Physics. On 9 March 1909, he married Ida Felicitas Berger, born 12 December 1881. He learned Esperanto some time before 1916.

== See also ==
- Bárány chair
- List of Austrian scientists
- List of famous Austrians
- List of famous Hungarians
- List of Jewish Nobel laureates
- Spatial disorientation
- Instrument flight
- Instrument rating
- Robert Bárány Award

== Sources ==
- Nobel Lectures, Physiology or Medicine 1901–1921. Amsterdam: Elsevier Publishing Company. 1967.
