= Johan Åqvist =

Swedish biochemist (born 1959)

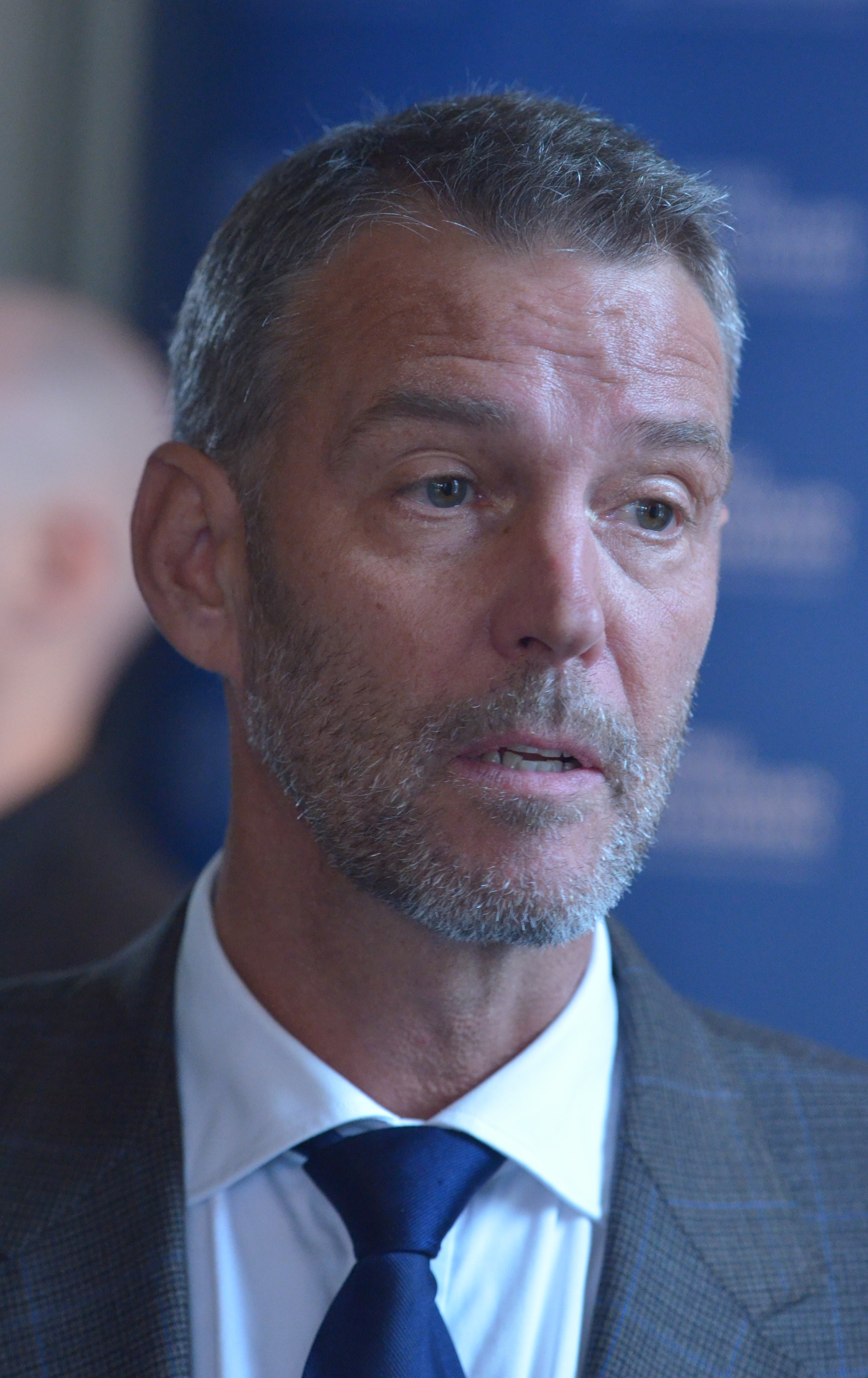
- Åqvist in 2012
- Education: Swedish University of Agricultural Sciences
- Scientific career
- Workplaces: Uppsala University
- Thesis: Protein dynamics and interactions (1987)

Johan Åqvist (born 1959) is a Swedish biochemist and academic. He is a professor of theoretical chemistry in the Department of Cell and Molecular Biology at Uppsala University and a member of the Royal Swedish Academy of Sciences as of 2023. He also served as chair of the Nobel Committee for Chemistry between 2021 and 2023.

== Biography ==
Åqvist was born in 1959. Åqvist received his Ph.D. in 1987 from the Swedish University of Agriculture.

He conducts research in the fields of physical chemistry, biochemistry, pharmacology and medicine. He is one of the authors of the Q software package for molecular dynamics.

In 2009, he was elected into the Royal Swedish Academy of Sciences.

Between 2021 and 2023, he served as chair of the Nobel Committee for Chemistry.
