= Empirical valence bond =

Method of calculating chemical reaction free energies

In theoretical chemistry, the Empirical Valence Bond (EVB) approach is an approximation for calculating free-energies of a chemical reaction in condensed-phase. It was first developed by Israeli chemist Arieh Warshel.

This approach can be considered as simplification of the quantum mechanical Valence Bond method in a way that was inspired by the work of Coulson and Danielson, However, the main difference is that the EVB generates potential surfaces from a calibrated Hamiltonian that incorporates the effect of the environment (e.g. the solvent) in a physically rigorous way, as well as provides a rigorous and effective way of obtaining the free energy surface booth in the diabatic and adiabatic representations. This generates microscopic diabatic parabolas that may look like the phenomenological Marcus parabolas (Marcus Theory ) but are obtained from physically based simulations and are used with a typically large mixing term (unlike the case in electron transfer reactions) to generate the adiabatic ground state free energy surface.

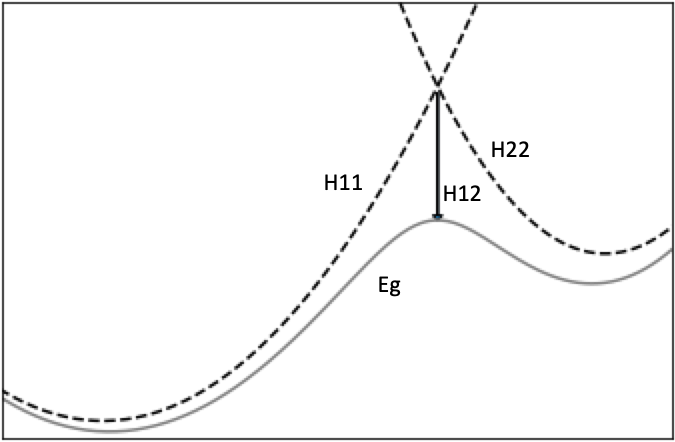
EVB coupling parameter H_{12}

Where most methods for reaction free-energy calculations require at least some part of the modeled system to be treated using quantum mechanics, EVB uses a calibrated Hamiltonian to approximate the potential energy surface of a reaction. For a simple 1-step reaction, that typically means that a reaction is modeled using 2 states. These states are valence bond descriptions of the reactants and products of the reaction. The function that gives the ground energy then becomes:

$$E_g = \frac{1}{2} \biggl(H_{11} + H_{22} - \sqrt{ (H_{11} - H_{22})^2 + 4H_{12}^2} \biggr)$$

where H_{11} and H_{22} are the valence bond descriptions of the reactant and product state respectively, and H_{12} is the coupling parameter. The H_{11} and H_{22} potentials are usually modeled using force field descriptions U_{reactants} and U_{products}. H_{12} is a bit trickier as it needs to be parameterized using a reference reaction. This reference reaction can be experimental, typically from a reaction in water or other solvents. Alternatively quantum chemical calculations can be used for calibration.

== Free energy calculations ==
To obtain free-energies from the created ground state energy potential one needs to perform sampling. This can be done using sampling methods like molecular dynamics or Monte Carlo simulations at different states along the reaction coordinates. Typically this is done using a free energy perturbation / umbrella sampling approach.

== Application ==
EVB has been successfully applied to calculating reaction free energies of enzymes. More recently it has been looked at as a tool to study enzyme evolution and to assist in enzyme design.

== Software ==
- Molaris
- Q
- RAPTOR (Rapid Approach for Proton Transport and Other Reactions)

== See also ==
- Electron equivalent
- Gregory A. Voth
