= Gunnar Hägg =

Swedish chemist and crystallographer (1903–1986)

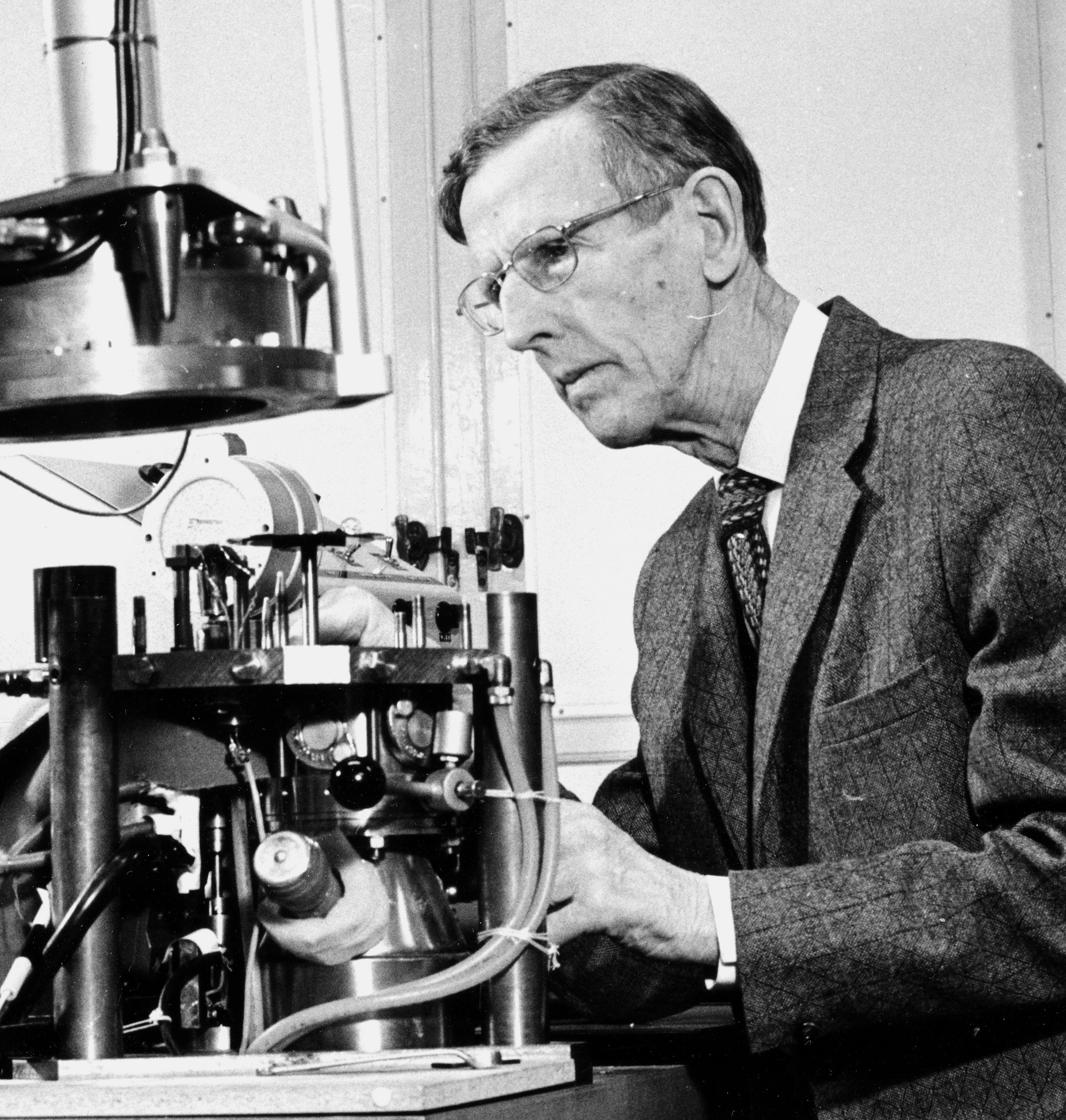
- Gunnar Hägg photographed by Rune Nordlund
- Born: December 14, 1903; Stockholm, Sweden
- Died: May 28, 1986 (aged 82); Uppsala, Sweden
- Education: Stockholm University; University of London
- Known for: Hägg diagram
- Scientific career
- Institutions: Stockholm University; University of Jena; Uppsala University
- Thesis: X-ray studies on the binary systems of iron with nitrogen, phosphorus, arsenic, antimony and bismuth (1929)
- Doctoral advisor: Arne Westgren
- Other academic advisors: Frederick G. Donnan
- Doctoral students: Arne Magnéli

Gunnar Hägg (December 14, 1903 in Stockholm – May 28, 1986 in Uppsala) was a Swedish chemist and crystallographer.

== Education and career ==
Hägg studied chemistry at Stockholm University from 1922, was a Ramsay Fellow at the University of London in 1926, studying under Frederick G. Donnan. He obtained his PhD in Stockholm in 1929 under Arne Westgren for the work X-ray studies on the binary systems of iron with nitrogen, phosphorus, arsenic, antimony and bismuth. After that he became a lecturer at the Stockholm University and in 1930 at the University of Jena, Germany. In 1937 he became professor of inorganic and general chemistry at Uppsala University. He retired in 1969.

Hägg's research dealt with nitrides, borides, carbides and hydrides of transition metals and determined their crystal structure with X-ray diffraction. He also developed X-ray cameras and calculating machines for this purpose. His investigations into phases and phase transformations in steel had practical applications. In Sweden he is known for his university chemistry textbooks.

== Honors and awards ==
He was a member of the Royal Society of Sciences in Uppsala (1940), the Royal Swedish Academy of Sciences (1942), the Royal Physiographic Society in Lund (1943) and the Royal Swedish Academy of Engineering Sciences, from which he received the Great Gold Medal in 1969. In 1960 he also became a member of the German National Academy of Sciences Leopoldina. A room in Uppsala University's Ångstrom Laboratory is named after him. In 1968 he received the Oscar Carlson Medal and in 1997 the Gunnar Starck Medal from the Swedish Chemical Society. From 1965 to 1976 he was a member of the Nobel Committee for Chemistry (and chairman in 1976).

== Bibliography ==
- Hägg, Gunnar (1960). Die Theoretischen Grundlagen der Analytischen Chemie (Zweite, Unveränderte Auflage ed.). Basel. ISBN 978-3-0348-4154-2. OCLC 913687110.
- Hägg, Gunnar (1969). [Allmän och oorganisk kemi.] General and inorganic chemistry; translated by Howard T. Evans, Jr. Howard T. EVANS. New York, Chichester: Wiley. ISBN 0-471-33872-9. OCLC 559519780.
- Bijvoet, J. M.; Burgers, W. G.; Hägg, G., eds. (1972). Early Papers on Diffraction of X-rays by Crystals. Volume 2. Boston, MA: Springer US. ISBN 978-1-4615-6878-0. OCLC 840286179.
- Hägg, Gunnar (1977). Kemisk reaktionslära : processer och jämvikter i kemisk analys. A & W). Stockholm: AWE/Geber. ISBN 91-20-04475-5. OCLC 185948179.
