= Per Delsing =

Swedish physicist (born 1959)

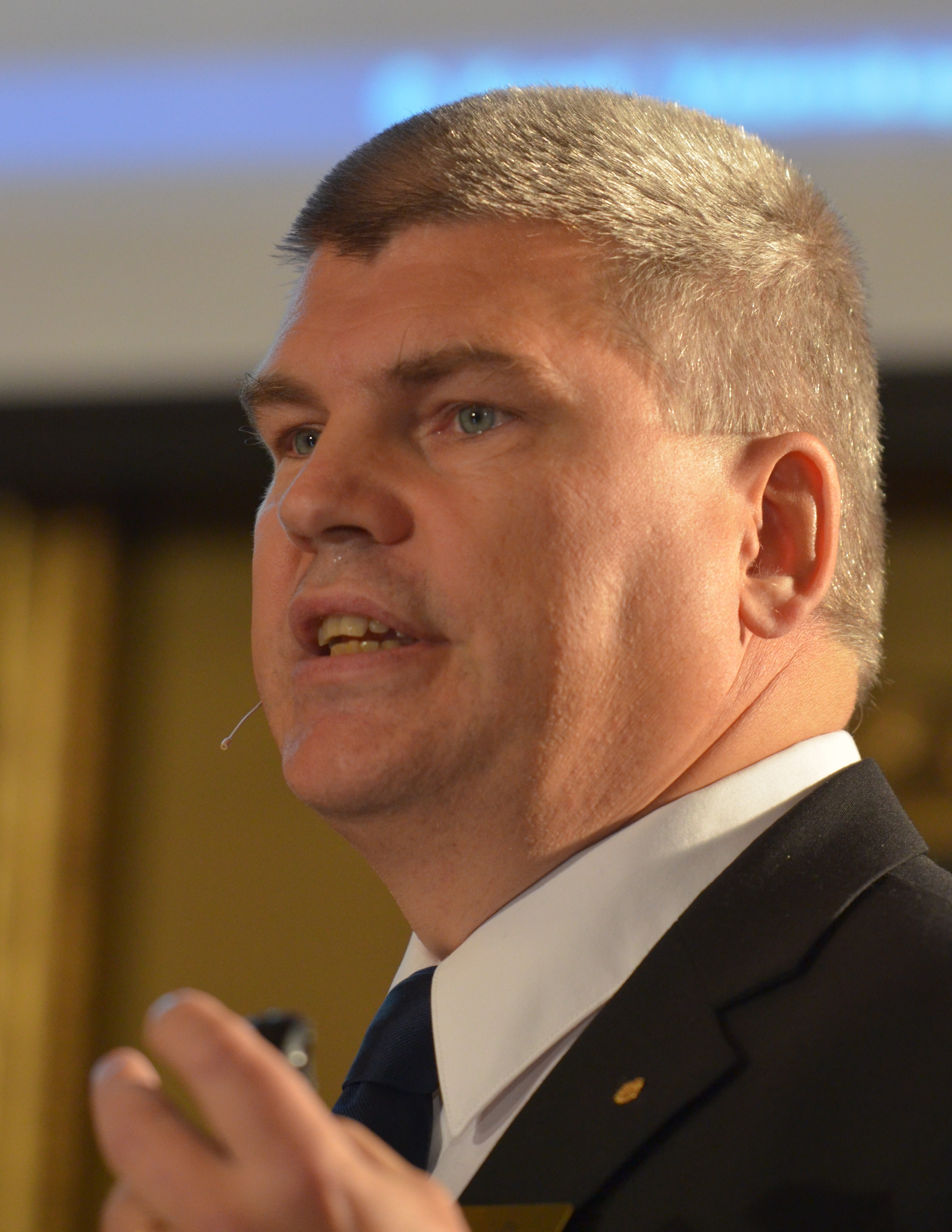
Per Delsing

Per Delsing (born 1959) is a Swedish physicist and professor in experimental physics at Chalmers University of Technology.

== Career ==
Per Delsing studied engineering physics at Lund University, where he graduated with a master of science in engineering (Swedish: civilingenjörsexam) in 1984. He then did his PhD at Chalmers University of Technology, where he defended in 1990 his thesis "Single electron tunneling in ultrasmall tunnel junctions". In 1991, he was appointed assistant professor at the University of Gothenburg, where he became associate professor in 1994. Since 1997, he has been a full professor in experimental physics at Chalmers.

Delsing's research focuses on quantum properties of superconducting devices. In particular, he studies quantum optics on chip, by investigating how superconducting artificial atoms interact with microwave photons. By placing the artificial atoms on piezoelectric surfaces, he also studies how the atoms interact with phonons in the form of Surface Acoustic Waves (SAWs).

In recent years, Delsing's research has been focusing on quantum information in superconducting qubits. In 2018, he became the director of the largest Swedish effort in quantum technology – the Wallenberg Center for Quantum Technology (WACQT) – which he led until the end of 2024. He has contributed to the development of a Swedish quantum agenda. In 2020, the Swedish newspaper Dagens Nyheter portrayed him as the biggest competitor (and friend of 30 years) of Nobel laureate John Martinis in the quantum computing race.

Delsing has, as of 2025, more than 130 peer-reviewed scientific publications, over 17000 citations, and an h-index of 69.

== Awards and distinctions ==
Delsing is a member of the Royal Swedish Academy of Engineering (IVA) since 1999, and of the Royal Swedish Academy of Sciences (KVA) since 2007. He was also a member of the Nobel Committee for Physics between 2007 and 2015, and its chairman in 2014.

In 2009, Delsing was awarded the Gustaf Dalén Medal by Chalmers University of Technology.

In 2015, he was granted the American Physical Society (APS) fellowship by the Division of Condensed Matter Physics "for pioneering research on the physics of single-electron devices, superconducting circuits, and microwave photonics". In the same year, he became a distinguished professor appointed by the Swedish Research Council (VR).

In 2024, Delsing became a Wallenberg Scholar. With this funding, he plans to take Swedish qubits two kilometers underground, in a Canadian mine, to explore how to counteract cosmic radiation effects in quantum computers.
