= Børge Bak =

Danish inventor, violinist, chemist and professor (1912–1990)

Børge Nielsen Bak
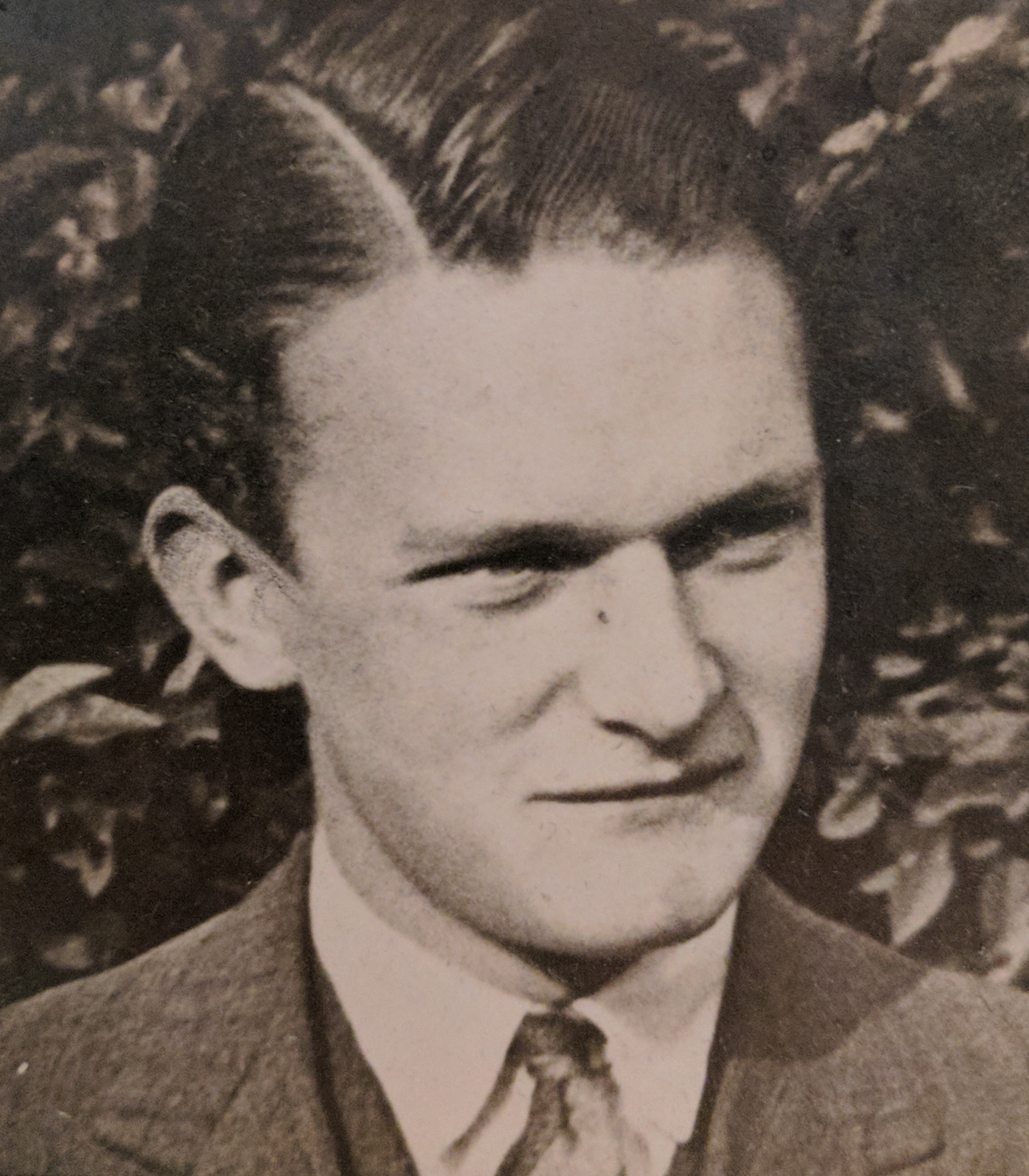
- Bak as a student
- Born: 31 December 1912; Copenhagen, Denmark
- Died: 22 February 1990 (aged 77); Gentofte, Denmark
- Education: University of Copenhagen; H.C. Ørsted Institute
- Occupations: Professor of molecular spectroscopy Professor of chemistry (H.C. Ørsted Institute at the University of Copenhagen) (1957-1983)
- Spouse: Harriet Sonja Estmi Jacobsen
- Children: Ole; Kirsten; Niels; Ulla
- Parent(s): Thorvald Bak and Hilmarie Bak (née Nielsen)
- Relatives: Erik Bak (grandchild); Christian Bak Følsgaard (grandchild); Eva B (grandchild); Torsten Bak Regueira (grandchild)

Børge Bak (31 December 1912 – 22 February 1990), Knight of the Order of the Dannebrog 1st Class, was a Danish polymath, inventor, violinist, chemist and professor of molecular spectroscopy at the University of Copenhagen, best known for his early contributions to the field of Molecular Spectroscopy. Bak travelled widely as a visiting professor, including to Stanford University (1958), the University of California, Berkeley (1969), Columbia University in the City of New York, and the University of Bologna (1976). He served as a nominator to the Nobel Committee for Chemistry and played an instrumental role in the 1991 Nobel Prize in Chemistry being awarded to Richard R. Ernst for his "contributions to the development of the methodology of high resolution nuclear magnetic resonance (NMR) spectroscopy".

Bak was the recipient of the 1957 Esso Foundation's prize for outstanding technical scientific research, and was elected a member of the Royal Danish Academy of Sciences in 1958.

== Biography ==
Bak received his bachelor's degree at the University of Copenhagen in mathematics, physics, chemistry and astronomy, specializing in organic chemistry. Immediately following his graduation, Bak served as a research assistant in the university's Department of Chemistry where he worked closely with the renowned organic chemist Einar Biilmann and spectroscopist Alex Langseth; and just the union of spectroscopy and synthetic organic chemistry formed the basis for Bak's later scientific work.

Bak's contribution to the field began early with his prize winning submission to the University of Copenhagen's call for papers on the subject of organic chemical elements that won him the gold medal. Bak continued to build upon this work in his doctoral thesis "The Internal Molecular Potential" which served as the forerunner of numerous treatises on molecular dynamics, the theoretical basis for the understanding of the molecular vibration and rotational spectra. He was awarded the D.Phil. in 1943.

Shortly after the Second World War, Bak traveled to Berkeley, California (1946–47) where he in collaboration with W. D. Gwinn built the first microwave spectrograph, an instrument that could be realized thanks to components developed originally for use in advanced war-time radar systems (Klystron oscillator). This work involved a considerable amount of vacuum-tube electronics and the handling of microwave radiation. At first they tried to detect the absorption in long lengths of waveguide, but shortly thereafter Stark modulation was developed and special waveguides containing an electrode allowed for the transmission of microwaves.

Bak was able to repeat this pioneering achievement upon his return to Copenhagen where he established a laboratory at the University of Copenhagen's H.C. Ørsted Institute. Over the following years, Bak's students and colleagues produced over 300 papers and publications containing precise determinations of molecular geometry from microwave spectra based on infrared spectroscopy, Raman-spectroscopy, microwave-spectroscopy and nuclear magnetic radiation spectroscopy. These early measurements and results were supplemented by Bak's work with quantum chemistry calculations of small molecular structures. Combined, this work formed the foundation for much of the understanding of the field today. Unusual within the field of spectroscopy, Bak's research branch encouraged - as one of the first in chemistry - the interaction between experts from disciplines as diverse as quantum chemistry, chemical physics, apparatus construction and electronics. In addition to his core research interests, Bak also published and continued to investigate related subjects such as infrared spectroscopy, nuclear magnetic resonance spectroscopy, and the spectra of volatile pyrolysis products which later proved to be important for chemistry and astro-chemistry.

== Reputation ==
The Danish Chemist and Jorck Prize winner Kjeld Rasmussen described his view of Bak in his farewell remarks from the University of Copenhagen: "My occupation with infrared spectroscopy lead to teaching Molecular Spectroscopy. It was done in collaboration with this subject's nestor in Denmark, Børge Bak, who was professor at the University of Copenhagen and external lecturer at Polyteknisk Læreanstalt which is the old name of the Technical University. Børge Bak was stepping down, being ill, and I soon took over the teaching, in the beginning with Bak as censor. A tough one, both to me and to the students."

== Wartime Activities ==
Børge Bak was an active member of the Danish Resistance, working overtly as a volunteer firefighter in order to gather secret documents and material after organized bombings.

== Memberships ==
- Royal Danish Academy of Sciences and Letters (1958)
- The Danish Academy of Technical Sciences (1961)
- Royal Physiographic Society in Lund (1969)
- Royal Swedish Academy of Sciences (1974)
- Norwegian Academy of Science and Letters (1975)

== Honours, decorations, awards and distinctions ==
- Nominator of the Swedish Academy for the proposal of the Nobel Prize in Chemistry
- Knight of Dannebrog 1st Class
- Knight of Dannebrog
- Founder of The Danish Society of Molecular Spectroscopy "Dansk Forening for Molekylspektroskopi" (1954)
- Esso-prize (1957)

== Selected bibliography ==
- Bak, Børge. Det Indremolekylære Potential, Et Studium over Valenskræfternes Natur Paa Basis Af Molekylspektrene. København, 1943.
- Bak, Børge. Elementary Introduction to Molecular Spectra. Amst, 1954.
- Bak, Børge. Elementary Introduction to Molecular Spectra. 2nd Rev. ed. North-Holland: Amsterdam, 1962.
- Bak, Børge, Led, Jens Jørgen, and Pedersen, Erik Jonas. Reversible Chemical Changes of Polypeptides in CF3COOH as Seen by Nuclear Magnetic Resonance Spectra. Munksgaard: Copenhagen, 1969.
- Bak, Børge, Kristiansen, Niels Arnt, and Svanholt, Henrik. Microwave Spectrum of Alleged P_{4}O_{7}. S.l., 1982.
