= Arne Magnéli =

Swedish chemist and crystallographer

- Born: 6 December 1914; Stockholm, Sweden
- Died: 22 July 1996 (aged 81); Stockholm, Sweden
- Education: Stockholm University; Uppsala University
- Scientific career
- Institutions: Stockholm University
- Doctoral advisor: Gunnar Hägg
- Other academic advisors: Arne Westgren

Arne Magnéli (6 December 1914 – 22 July 1996) was a Swedish chemist and crystallographer known for his work on the structure determination of transition metal oxides and alloys, including the study into their homologous series and nonstoichiometric phenomenon.

== Education and career ==
Magnéli studied at Stockholm University and graduated with a Licentiate in 1941. He moved to Uppsala University to conduct his graduate research under Gunnar Hägg, obtaining his PhD in 1950 for the study on tungsten bronzes. He took up a teaching position at Stockholm University in 1953, and later became the Chair of Inorganic Chemistry at the university until his retirement in 1980.

From his research into the structures of transition metal oxides, Magnéli developed the concept of recurrent dislocations, which nowadays is known as crystallographic shear. The Magnéli phases of transition metal oxides, such as nonstoichiometric tungsten oxide, molybdenum oxide, titanium oxide, and vanadium oxide are named after him.

== Honors and awards ==
Magnéli was awarded the Gregori Aminoff Prize of the Royal Swedish Academy of Sciences in 1989. He served as the secretary of the Nobel Committee for Physics from 1966 to 1973 and the Nobel Committee for Chemistry from 1966 to 1986.
