= Gösta Ekspong =

Swedish physicist (1922–2017)

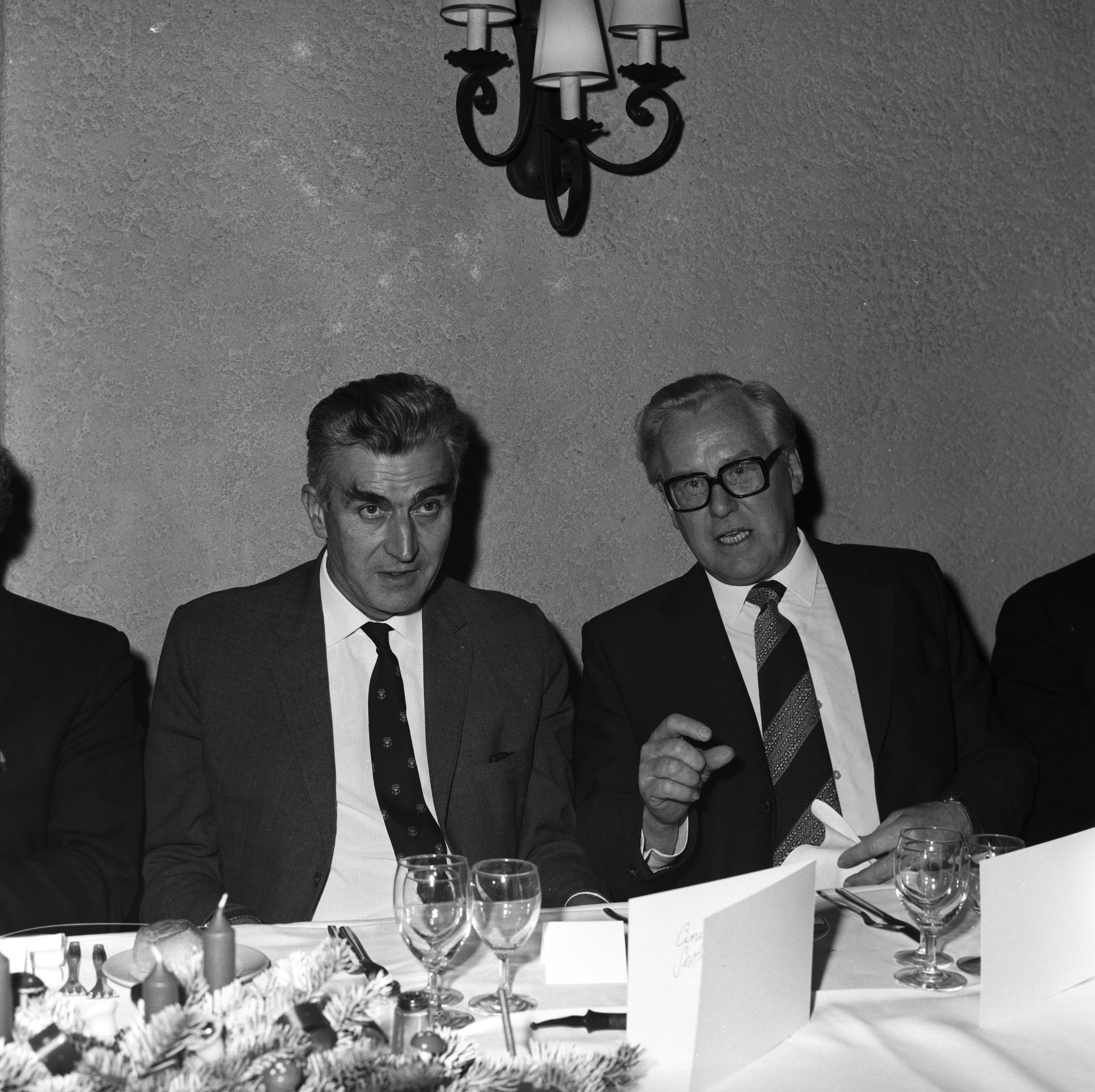
John Adams, CERN Director General, and Gösta Ekspong, Chair of the CERN Scientific Policy Committee.

Anders Gösta Ekspong (born Anders Gösta Carlson on 24 February 1922 in Skogstorp, Husby-Rekarne Township, Södermanland County, – 24 February 2017) was a Swedish physicist and former professor at Stockholm University. His main area of work was atomic physics. Ekspong defended his thesis for doctorate in 1955 at Uppsala University with a dissertation on Cosmic Radiation under supervision of Axel E. Lindh.

Ekspong is considered to be one of the Swedish pioneers in the involvement of the particle physics laboratory at CERN. At CERN, he was chairman of the Emulsion Experiments Committee from the early 1960s as well as member of the Scientific Policy Committee (1969-1975), where he also spent two years as chairman (1972-1974). He made a significant contribution to the search strategies that would later be used in the search of the Higgs boson and participated in the technological development of DELPHI. Ekspong was elected as a member of the Royal Swedish Academy of Sciences in 1969. From 1975 to 1988 he was also a member of the Nobel Committee for Physics where he held the post of chairman between 1987 and 1988. During his career Ekspong published several scientific publications regarding subjects such as particle physics, astrophysics and nuclear physics, some together with researchers at the University of Bristol and the University of California. He is currently buried at Skogskyrkogården in Stockholm.
