= Gunnar Ingelman =

Swedish theoretical physicist (b. 1952)

Björn Gunnar Ingelman (born 1952), is a Swedish physicist working as a professor of theoretical particle physics at Uppsala University, who is also the secretary of the Nobel Committee for Physics.

== Life ==
Ingelman received his PhD in theoretical physics in 1982 at Lund University. His supervisors were Bo Andersson and Gösta Gustafson. His opponent was Frank Close. Ingelman created and leads the Theoretical High Energy Physics group at Uppsala University. Gunnar Ingelman is also a member of the Royal Swedish Academy of Sciences at physics class.
