= Gustaf Ising =

Swedish physicist (1883–1960)

Gustaf Adolf Ising
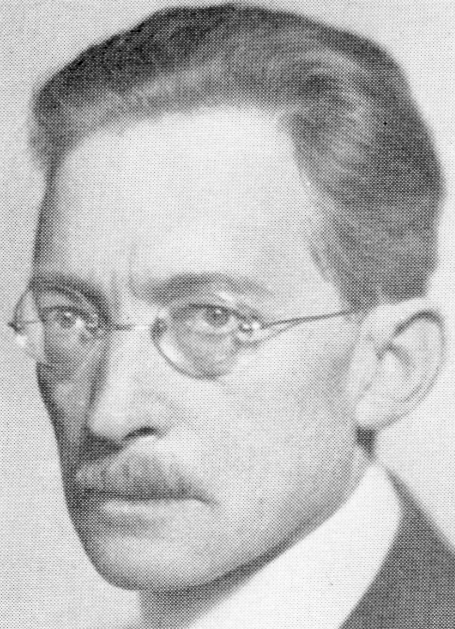
- Portrait of Gustaf Adolf Ising
- Pronunciation: [ˈɡɵ̂sːtav ˈɑ̂ːdɔlf ˈîːsɪŋ]
- Born: February 19, 1883; Finja, Skåne County
- Died: February 5, 1960 (aged 76); Danderyd, Stockholm County
- Other names: Gustaf Adolf Nilsson; Gustav Ising
- Education: Uppsala University; (BA, 15 September 1903); Stockholm University; (Licentiate, 28 May 1910); (PhD, 30 May 1919)
- Known for: Conceptualising the linear particle accelerator
- Spouse: Aina Hildegard Maria Ising née Schoug (m. 1924)
- Children: Anna Maria Berggren née Ising
- Parents: Jonas Nilsson (father); Maria Nilsson née Jönsson (mother)
- Scientific career
- Fields: Geophysics; Metrology; Accelerator physics
- Workplaces: Stockholm University; Royal Swedish Academy of Sciences; Nobel Committee for Physics
- Thesis: Investigations concerning electrometers (1919)

Gustaf Adolf Ising (Swedish pronunciation: [ˈɡɵ̂sːtav ˈɑ̂ːdɔlf ˈîːsɪŋ]; 19 February 1883 - 5 February 1960) was a Swedish metrologist, geophysicist, and accelerator physicist.

== Biography ==
Ising earned his first academic degree (filosofie kandidat/Bachelor of Arts) at Uppsala University in 1903 and continued studying at Stockholm University receiving his Ph.D. in 1919, and receiving an honorary professor title in 1934.

He is best known for the invention of the linear accelerator concept in 1924, which is the progenitor of all modern accelerators based on oscillating electromagnetic fields. His article was then taken up and turned into practice by Rolf Widerøe, also starting the development of cyclic accelerator structures like the cyclotron.

He was elected to the Swedish Academy of Sciences in 1935, being a member of the Nobel Committee for Physics from 1947 to 1953, together with former Nobel laureate and chairman Manne Siegbahn, Svante Arrhenius, Erik Hulthen, Axel Edvin Lindh, Ivar Waller, and Gudmund Borelius.
