= Xiaodong Zou =

Chinese-Swedish chemist

- Education: Peking University; Beijing University of Technology; Stockholm University
- Scientific career
- Workplaces: Lund University; Stockholm University
- Thesis: Electron crystallography of inorganic structures : theory and practice (1997)

Xiaodong Zou (born 1964) is a Chinese-Swedish chemist who is a professor at Stockholm University. Her research considers the development of electron diffraction for the three dimensional characterisation of materials. She is a member of the Nobel Committee for Chemistry. She was elected to the Royal Swedish Academy of Sciences and the Royal Swedish Academy of Engineering Sciences.

== Early life and education ==
Zou was an undergraduate student at Peking University, where she majored in physics. She moved to the Beijing University of Technology for graduate studies, where she specialised in the physics of metals. At Beijing, she worked alongside K.H. Kuo, a chemical engineer. She moved to Sweden as a doctoral researcher, where she worked in structural chemistry at Stockholm University. Her doctoral research considered electron crystallography and how it could be used to understand inorganic and biological structures. After earning her doctorate, she joined Lund University, where she worked alongside David Veblen.

== Research and career ==
In 1996, Zou joined the faculty at Stockholm University, where she was made professor in 2005. Her research involves uncovering the atomic structures of nanosized crystals using electron crystallography. She has demonstrated that transmission electron microscopy can be used to determine the structure of zeolites and mesoporous crystals, as well as metal–organic frameworks, covalent organic frameworks and protein microcrystals. She has developed quantitative analysis software to facilitate the analysis of electron microscopy images, with a particular focus on three-dimensional electron diffraction.

Zou launched the Berzelii Center EXSELENT on Porous Materials in 2006, and served as director for 6 years.

== Awards and honours ==
- 2002 Tage Erlander Prize
- 2008 Stockholm University Göran Gustafsson Prize
- 2010 K.H. Kuo Award
- 2012 Swedish Chemical Society Arrhenius medal

== Selected publications ==
- Haoquan Zheng; Yuning Zhang; Leifeng Liu; Wei Wan; Peng Guo; Andreas M Nyström; Xiaodong Zou (2015). "One-pot Synthesis of Metal-Organic Frameworks with Encapsulated Target Molecules and Their Applications for Controlled Drug Delivery". Journal of the American Chemical Society. 138 (3): 962–968. doi:10.1021/jacs.5b11720. PMID 26710234. Wikidata Q38808504.
- Junliang Sun; Charlotte Bonneau; Angel Cantín; Corma, Avelino; María J Díaz-Cabañas; Manuel Moliner; Daliang Zhang; Mingrun Li; Xiaodong Zou (2009). "The ITQ-37 mesoporous chiral zeolite". Nature. 458 (7242): 1154–1157. doi:10.1038/nature07957. PMID 19407798. Wikidata Q51834728.
- Matthew J Cliffe; Wei Wan; Xiaodong Zou; Philip A Chater; Annette K Kleppe; Tucker, Matthew; Wilhelm, Heribert; Nicholas P Funnell; Coudert, François-Xavier; Andrew L Goodwin (2014). "Correlated defect nanoregions in a metal-organic framework". Nature Communications. 5: 4176. Bibcode:2014NatCo...5.4176C. doi:10.1038/ncomms5176. PMC 4730551. PMID 24946837. Wikidata Q41924932.
