= Ingemar Lundström =

Swedish physicist (born 1941)

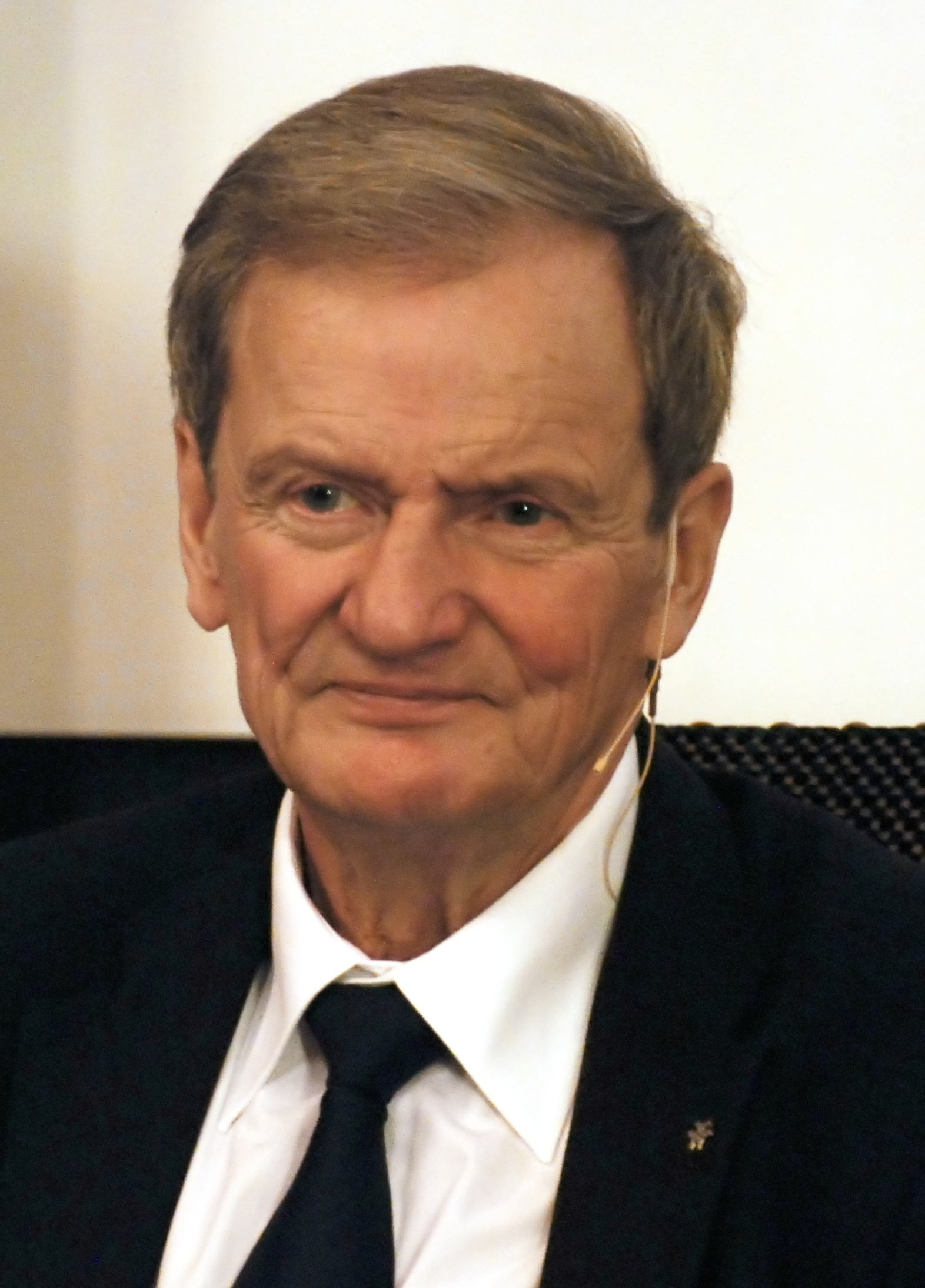
Ingemar Lundström at the announcement of the 2010 Nobel Prize in Physics.

Ingemar Lundström, born 9 May 1941 in Skellefteå, Sweden, is a Swedish professor of applied physics at Linköping University.

Professor Lundström received his B.S. in electrical engineering in 1967 at Chalmers University of Technology and his Ph.D. in solid state physics in 1970 from the same university. He worked at Chalmers until 1978, when he was appointed a professor in the chair of applied physics at Linköping University, a position he held until his retirement.

His primary research areas are in biosensors and chemical sensors.

Lundström is a member of the Royal Swedish Academy of Engineering Sciences since 1982 and a member of the Swedish Royal Academy of Science since 1987.

He was elected to the Nobel Committee for Physics in 2006, and is its chairman from 2010.

== Awards ==
- Björkénska Prize, Uppsala University, 1986
- Outstanding Contribution to the International Chemical Sensor Community, 4th International Meeting of Chemical Sensors, 1992
- Erna Ebelings Prize, Swedish Medical Association, 1994
- Chester Carlson Award, 1997
- Outstanding Achievement Award, Sensor Division of the Electrochemical Society, 1998
- Gold Medal, Royal Swedish Academy of Engineering Sciences, 1999
- Akzo Nobel Science Award, 2001
- Honorary Doctorate, Royal Institute of Technology, 2001
