= Quarterly Reviews of Biophysics =

- Discipline: Biophysics
- Language: English
- Edited by: Bengt Nordén

Publication details
- History: 1968–present
- Publisher: Cambridge University Press
- Open access: Hybrid
- Impact factor: 5.318 (2020)

Standard abbreviations
- ISO 4: Q. Rev. Biophys.

Indexing
- CODEN: QURBAW
- ISSN: 0033-5835 (print); 1469-8994 (web)

Links
- Journal homepage; Online archive

Quarterly Reviews of Biophysics is a peer-reviewed scientific journal on biophysics, published by Cambridge University Press. It was established in 1968. The current chief editor is Bengt Nordén. According to the Journal Citation Reports, the journal has a 2020 impact factor of 5.318, ranking it 10th out of 71 journals in the category "Biophysics".
