= Joseph Nordgren =

Swedish physicist

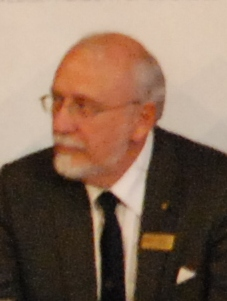
Joseph Nordgren 2009

Ernst Joseph Nordgren, born 16 November 1947 in Örebro, is a Swedish physicist.

Nordgren graduated as a B.Sc. from Uppsala University in 1971 and received his Ph.D. in physics in 1977. In 1979 he was made docent, and since 1988 he has been a professor of soft X-ray physics at Uppsala. Since 1 July 2008 Nordgren has been vice rector for science and engineering at Uppsala University.

Nordgren became a member of the Royal Swedish Academy of Sciences in 1996. He was a member of the Nobel Committee for Physics from 2001 to 2009, and the Committee's chairman in 2008 and 2009. He has also been a member of the Royal Society of Sciences and Letters in Uppsala since 1981 and of the Royal Society of Sciences in Uppsala since 2005.
