= Åke Gerhard Ekstrand =

Swedish chemist (1846–1933)

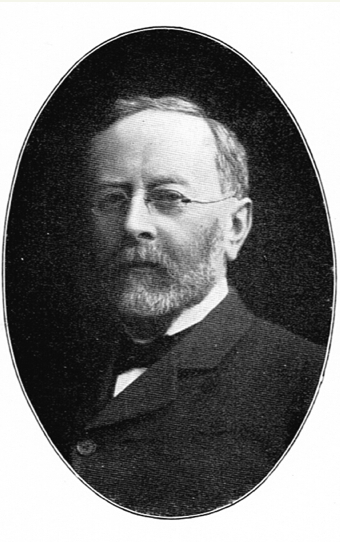
Åke Gerhard Ekstrand, 1930

Åke Gerhard Ekstrand (28 December 1846, Gränna - 9 April 1933) was a Swedish chemist, academic and public servant. He held several technical and regulatory positions within the Swedish Ministry of Finance and contributed extensively to chemical research, industrial chemistry and scientific publishing in Sweden.

== Early life and education ==
Ekstrand enrolled at the University of Uppsala in 1865 and earned his Bachelor of Arts degree in 1872. He became Docent in chemistry in 1875 and obtained his Doctor of Philosophy degree the same year (Primus). Supported by a state research scholarship, he continued advanced chemical studies in 1877–1878 at the University of Zurich and the Ludwig-Maximilians-Universität München.

== Academic and professional career ==
From 1879 to 1889, Ekstrand served as the commercial chemist in Uppsala. In 1889, he was appointed teacher at the Chalmers educational institution in Gothenburg. Beginning in 1890, he worked as a technical officer (byråingenjör) at the Control and Adjustment Bureau of the Ministry of Finance. He later served as chief engineer of the Inspection and Adjustment Board (1907–1909) and, subsequently, of the Control Board (Kontrollstyrelsen) from 1909 to 1913.

== Research ==
Ekstrand published studies in organic and industrial chemistry. His dissertation, Reten och några dess derivater, appeared in German in Liebigs Annalen (vol. 185, 1877). He produced further papers on reten in the Öfversigt af Kongl. Vetenskaps Akademiens Förhandlingar (1876, 1884). He contributed to the knowledge of carbohydrates (1887–1889) and authored numerous studies on naphthalene derivatives, mainly naphthoic acids (1879–1888).

As commercial chemist and later as technical officer, he wrote practical reports and articles on subjects such as sugar taxation (Lantbruksakademiens handlingar, 1905), the denaturing of spirits (Kemisk tidskrift, 1893–1901), and the malt drink industry (Kemisk tidskrift, 1893, 1897, 1898). He authored major sections on manufacturing industries in the compendium Sveriges land och folk (1901) and was responsible for most of the Swedish catalogues prepared for the world's fairs in Paris (1900) and Liège (1905).

== Editorial work ==
From 1893, Ekstrand served as editor of Svensk kemisk tidskrift, dedicating substantial effort to the development of the journal. In this capacity, and through contributions to Swedish and international chemical periodicals, conference proceedings and travel reports, he documented advances in chemical industry and the development of modern chemistry.

== Honors and memberships ==
Ekstrand was elected member of the Royal Swedish Academy of Agriculture and Forestry in 1896 and of the Royal Swedish Academy of Sciences in 1903. He served as preses of the Academy of Sciences in 1920-1921 and was a member of the Nobel Committee for Chemistry from 1913 to 1924.

He also acted as judge at several exhibitions, including those in Stockholm (1897) and Paris (1900), and was a member of the 1903 committees on sugar and tobacco taxation.

== Sources ==
- "Ekstrand, Åke Gerhard". Nordisk familjebok (2nd ed.). 1907 – via Project Runeberg.
- "Ekstrand, Å. G.". Nordisk familjebok (Supplement, 2nd ed.). 1923 – via Project Runeberg.
