= Audrey Cameron =

Polymer chemist

Audrey Cameron OBE is a Chancellor's Fellow working at the University of Edinburgh. She is Deaf and uses British Sign Language.

== Biography ==
Cameron gained her degree in chemistry from the University of West of Scotland before achieving a PhD in Chemistry from the University of Strathclyde with a thesis on hydrogel polymer membranes. She then carried out her postdoctoral research at both Strathclyde and Durham Universities, before completing a PGCE course in Secondary Education (Chemistry with Science) at the Moray House School of Education and Sport in 2004, after which she spent some time teaching Chemistry and Science in mainstream schools.

Currently, she is a Chancellor's Fellow in Science Education and BSL. She teaches on the PGDE Secondary Education (Chemistry/ General Science) course and she delivers science workshops for the PGDE Primary Education course. She also delivers the Deaf Studies module as part of the MSc Inclusive Education team. In 2020 she was awarded a five-year Chancellor’s Fellowship, focusing on research on science education and BSL.

Cameron also manages the Scottish Sensory Centre's STEM in BSL Glossary project. This project, which has been active since 2007, aims at developing a glossary of British signs and definitions to cover STEM disciplines and support teaching of such subjects to Deaf pupils. The glossary has nearly 4,500 signs with BSL definitions and examples. Each sign and definition is developed by a team of Deaf scientists, mathematicians, teachers working with deaf children, and BSL sign linguists, in order to be correct both linguistically and scientifically, and to be effective in conveying a concept.

In 2016, Cameron was selected to be part of the exhibition "175 Faces of Chemistry", which showcased the diversity of the chemistry profession through 175 stories of individuals working in chemistry and organised by the Royal Society of Chemistry (RSC) in the lead up of the 175th anniversary of its foundation.

In 2022, Cameron was admitted as an Honorary Fellow of the RSC, which is its most senior category of membership reserved for those who are distinguished in the science or profession of chemistry.

Cameron was appointed Officer of the Order of the British Empire (OBE) in the 2023 Birthday Honours for services to chemical sciences and inclusion in science communications.

In 2024, Cameron was awarded an Honorary Doctorate from the University of the West of Scotland.
