= Thisbe Lindhorst =

German professor and biochemist (born 1962)

Thisbe Lindhorst HonFRSC
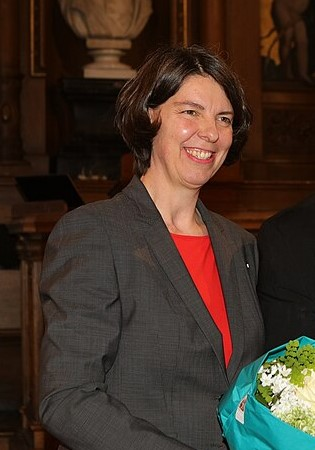
- Lindhorst awarding the Carl Duisberg Memorial Prize in 2016
- Born: 19 November 1962 (age 63); Munich
- Education: LMU Munich; University of Münster; University of Hamburg
- Scientific career
- Fields: Carbohydrate chemistry Glycoscience
- Workplaces: Kiel University

Thisbe Kerstin Lindhorst HonFRSC (born 19 November 1962) is a German biochemist who has been professor of organic chemistry and biochemistry at Kiel University since 2000. She was a board member of the German Chemical Society from 2012 to 2019, and was elected as its president from 2016 to 2017. Her research focuses on glycosciences and the function of the glycocalyx.

== Early life and education ==
Lindhorst was born on 19 November 1962 in Munich. She studied chemistry at LMU Munich from 1981 to 1984 and chemistry with biochemistry at the University of Münster from 1985 to 1987. She achieved a PhD at the University of Hamburg in 1991, with a thesis on the inhibitors of fucose metabolism.

She undertook her postdoctorate at the University of British Columbia in Vancouver, Canada from 1992, focusing on carbohydrates and dendrimers, before returning to Hamburg to earn her habilitation in 1998.

== Career ==
In 2000, Lindhorst was appointed Full Professor of Organic Chemistry at Kiel University; she was the first woman to hold the post since the Second World War.

In 2015, Lindhorst was elected president of the German Chemical Society (GDCh) for the 2016–2017 term. She was second women to hold the position in the society's 150-year history.

As part of the society's anniversary commemorations in 2017, Lindhorst co-edited Unendliche Weiten: Kreuz und quer durchs Chemie-Universum, a book covering the implications of modern chemistry to everyday life, with Hans-Jürgen Quadbeck-Seeger. In August 2017, she wrote the editorial for Angewandte Chemie celebrating the GDCh's anniversary, noting chemistry's moral and ethical duties, and pushing for "a culture that has the well-being of the entire population and the planet in mind".

=== Research ===
Lindhorst is an expert in carbohydrate chemistry and has written over 150 research papers. She has pioneered studies of multivalency in the glycosciences and the importance of the orientation of molecules on cell surfaces for biological recognition. Her findings around molecule orientation have potential for anti-adhesion therapies and in antimicrobial drug development.

=== Honours and awards ===
In 1998, Lindhorst was awarded the chemistry prize of the Göttingen Academy of Sciences and Humanities and the Karl Ziegler funding award. She also won the Carl Duisberg Memorial Prize in 2000.

In 2017, Lindhorst was one of 12 women given the IUPAC Distinguished Women in Chemistry or Chemical Engineering award. She was also made an Honorary Fellow of the Royal Society of Chemistry in 2017.

== Personal life ==
Lindhorst has two children, born in 1991 and 1995.
