= David B. Haviland =

Swedish-American physicist (born 1961)

David Brant Haviland
- Born: David B. Haviland; 22 July 1961 (age 65); Bar Harbor, Maine, United States
- Education: Union College
- Awards: Wallmarkska prize 2008 Member Swedish Royal Academy of Sciences Fulbright Scholar, 1983-1984
- Scientific career
- Fields: Physics
- Workplaces: Royal Institute of Technology
- Doctoral advisor: Allen M. Goldman

David Brant Haviland (born July 22, 1961, in Bar Harbor, Maine), is a Swedish-American physicist, professor in nanostructure physics and mesoscopic physics at the Royal Institute of Technology in Sweden.

Haviland grew up in Ames, Iowa, and studied physics at Union College 1979–83, New York. Within the Fulbright program 1983/84 he was at the University of Göttingen. He received his Ph.D. in 1989 at the University of Minnesota. Between 1989 and 1997 he worked at Chalmers University of Technology before joining the Royal Institute of Technology as a professor in 1997.

His research on fundamental and applied physics in mesoscopic condensed matter. His research is focused on superconducting insulator quantum phase transition in thin films and related phenomena in single Josephson junctions and SQUIDs. He is also developing experimental and theoretical methods to investigate nonlinear dynamical systems by measuring and analyzing the intermodulation (frequency mixing, frequency mixing), this method was patented and was developed for use in atomic force microscopy. Haviland has over 100 peer reviewed articles.

Haviland was awarded the Wallmark Prize in 2008 "for his discoveries concerning the development of mesoscopic physics". He was elected in 2011 as member of the Royal Swedish Academy of Sciences, and is presently a member of the Nobel Committee for Physics.

== Publications ==
- Haviland, D. B.; Liu, Y.; Goldman, A. M. (1989), "Onset of superconductivity in the two-dimensional limit", Phys. Rev. Lett., vol. 62, no. 18, The American Physical Society (published 1989-05-01), pp. 2180–2183, Bibcode:1989PhRvL..62.2180H, doi:10.1103/PhysRevLett.62.2180, PMID 10039876
- Kuzmin, L. S.; Haviland, D. B. (1991), "Observation of the Bloch oscillations in an ultrasmall Josephson junction", Phys. Rev. Lett., vol. 67, no. 20, The American Physical Society (published 1991-11-11), pp. 2890–2893, Bibcode:1991PhRvL..67.2890K, doi:10.1103/PhysRevLett.67.2890, PMID 10044580
- Platz, Daniel; Forchheimer, Daniel; Tholén, Erik A; Haviland, David B. (2012), "The role of nonlinear dynamics in quantitative atomic force microscopy", Nanotechnology, vol. 23, no. 26, IOP Publishing (published 2012-06-15), p. 265705, arXiv:1202.5217, Bibcode:2012Nanot..23z5705P, doi:10.1088/0957-4484/23/26/265705, PMID 22699717, S2CID 10013851
