= Olle Inganäs =

Swedish physicist

Olle Inganäs (born 1951), is a Swedish Professor of Biomolecular and Organic Electronics at Linköping University, Sweden.

Professor Inganäs received his doctorate in 1984 from Linköping University.

His research interests are in polymer optoelectronics and bioelectronics, conjugated polymer physics and polymer electrochemistry.

== Awards ==
- Member of the Royal Swedish Academy of Sciences, 2006.
- Göran Gustafsson Prize, Royal Swedish Academy of Sciences, 1997.
