= Norbert Untersteiner =

Italian polar scientist (1926–2012)

Norbert Untersteiner (February 24, 1926 – March 14, 2012) was one of the pioneers of modern polar science research, a professor of Atmospheric Sciences at the University of Washington, and an AAAS Fellow.

Born in Merano, Italy, he led the Arctic Ice Dynamics Joint Experiment (AIDJEX) in the early 1970s. In 1979, he formed the Arctic Buoy Program as a contribution to the Global Atmospheric Research Program. He then formed the Polar Science Center (PSC) at the University of Washington and directed it from 1981 until 1988.

Untersteiner died of prostate cancer in March 2012, in Seattle, Washington.
