= Olga Botner =

Physicist

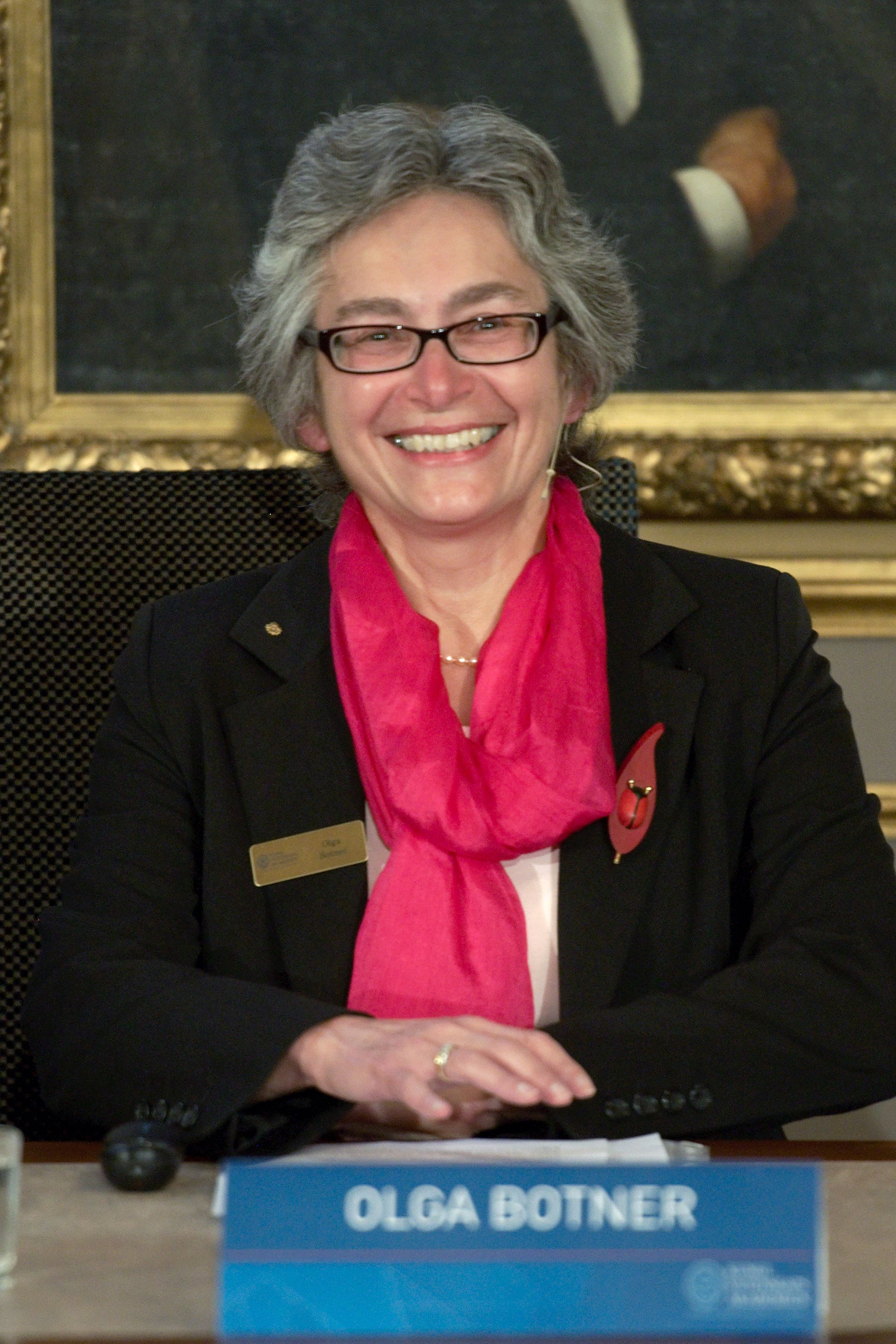
- Education: University of Copenhagen

Olga Botner is a professor of experimental particle physics at Uppsala University known for her work on neutrinos. She is an elected member of the Royal Swedish Academy of Sciences. From 2013 until 2017 she was the spokesperson for the IceCube Neutrino Observatory.

== Education and career ==
Botner received her candidate (degree) from the University of Copenhagen in 1978. She earned her Ph.D. in 1985 from the University of Copenhagen.

After receiving her Ph.D., Botner worked at CERN on the Axial Field Spectrometer experiment at the Intersecting Storage Rings, which included calorimetry and quark flavor detection. She then worked on charm quark identification with the ring imaging Cherenkov counter placed in the UA2 experiment. In 1998, she transitioned to astroparticle physics and joined the Antarctic Muon And Neutrino Detector Array, a neutrino telescope located at the South Pole.

Botner has held leadership positions in the international IceCube partnership, serving as spokesperson from 2013 to 2017.

From 2010 until 2019 Botner served on the Nobel Prize committee for physics.

== Research ==
Botner is known for her work in multi-messenger astronomy, and her research has led to speculation that she will receive a Nobel Prize in physics. She has examined neutrino detection with the IceCube Neutrino Observatory serving as her main research platform. In 2017 Botner was part of the team that was able to track a neutrino measured at the IceCube observatory back to a blazar located 3.7 billion light years away.

In 2023 she led work on a search for coincident neutrino emissions from fast radio bursts (FRBs). Botner, along with her collaborators, analyzed data from seven years of IceCube cascade events to investigate whether there was a correlation between fast radio bursts and neutrino signals, ultimately seeking to expand understanding of the mechanical processes behind these high-energy astrophysical occurrences.

In another study, Botner worked to constrain high-energy neutrino emissions from supernovae, and her research helped elucidate the role of neutrinos in these explosive events, providing insights into supernova dynamics and the potential for neutrinos to serve as cosmic messengers.

Botner's collaboration with the IceCube Neutrino Observatory has led to the development of IceCat-1, the IceCube Event Catalog of Alert Tracks which provides a comprehensive list of important neutrino events and aims to facilitate real-time observation and collaboration among researchers.

Botner has also worked on gamma-ray bursts (GRBs). In 2024 Botner and her team used IceCube data to investigate high-energy neutrinos generated by gamma-ray bursts, which examined how these energetic bursts can be sources of cosmic neutrinos. In 2024 she published an analysis of 11 years' worth of data from IceCube, focusing on the search for continuous and transient neutrino emissions as she sought to uncover the potential astrophysical origins of high-energy neutrinos by examining their connection to short-lived astronomical phenomena such as GRBs and supernovae.

== Honors and awards ==
In 2001 Botner was elected member of the Royal Swedish Academy of Sciences. Botner, Fred Nyberg, and Johan Svedjedal received the Rudbeck Medal from Uppsala University in 2017.

== Selected publications ==
- Botner, Olga (1990). Production of prompt electrons in the charm Pt at √s = 630 GeV. OCLC 923629602.
- Botner, Olga (2019). "Den besynnerliga neutrinon". KOSMOS. 95: 30–51. doi:10.31714/KOSMOS.2019.02.
- IceCube Collaboration; et al. (2018-07-13). "Neutrino emission from the direction of the blazar TXS 0506+056 prior to the IceCube-170922A alert" (PDF). Science. 361 (6398): 147–151. arXiv:1807.08794. Bibcode:2018Sci...361..147I. doi:10.1126/science.aat2890. ISSN 0036-8075. PMID 30002248.
