= Anders Bárány =

Swedish physicist (born 1942)

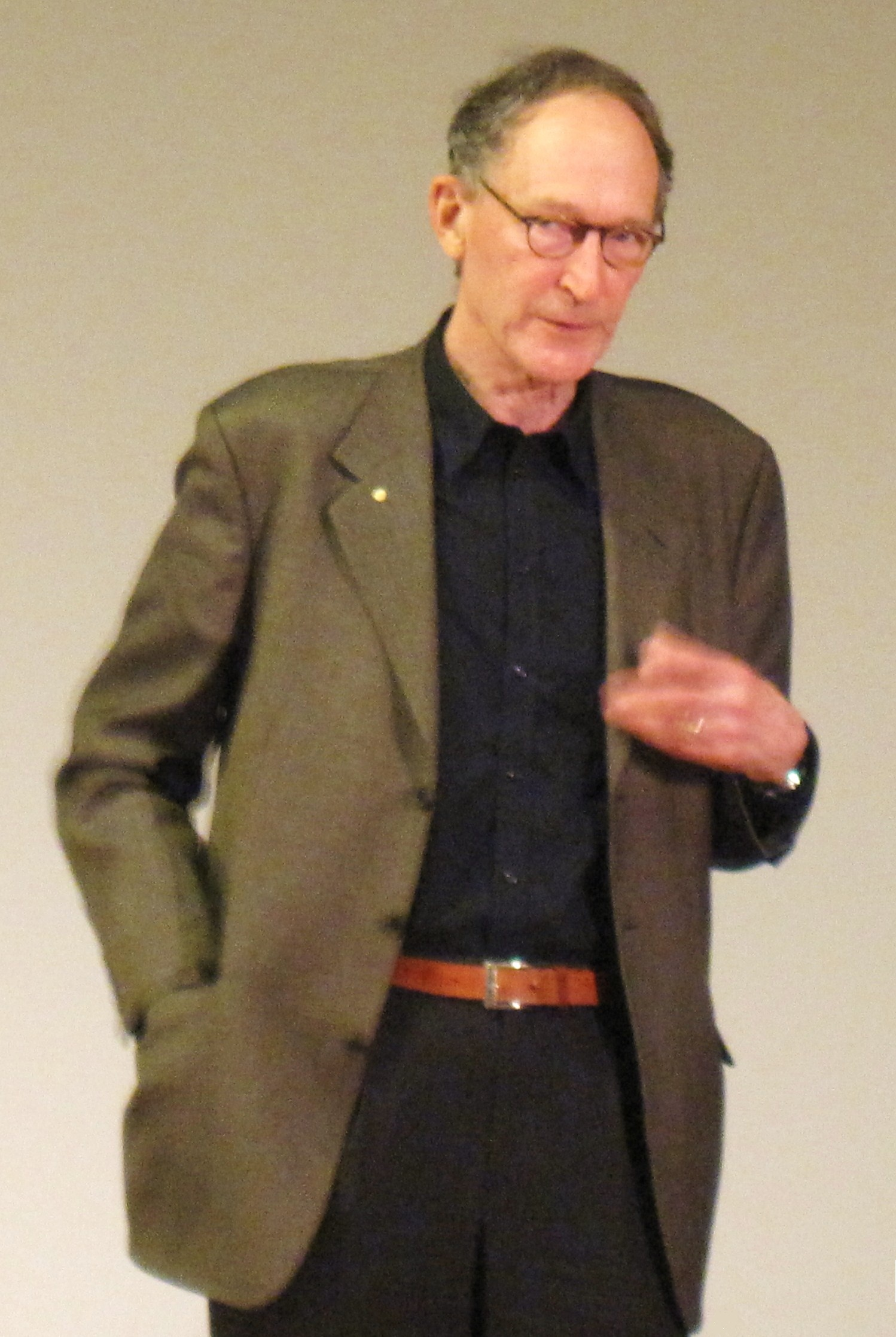
- Bárány in 2010
- Born: John Bárány; 13 July 1942 (age 83); Uppsala, Sweden
- Occupation: Scientist

John Anders Bárány (born 13 July 1942, dead 14 October 2025) was a Swedish scientist working in the field of theoretical physics.

== Career ==
Bárány became a doctor of philosophy in theoretical physics at Uppsala University in 1973 and later became university doctor at the same university. During the 1980s he worked at the Research Institute for Atomic Physics in Stockholm. Since parts of the institute was transferred to Stockholm University and renamed as the Manne Sieghbahn Laboratory, Bárány became a professor there.

Bárány has worked at the Kungliga Vetenskapsakademien. He was an editor at Physica Scripta between 1988 and 1996 and secretary for the Nobel committee in physics between 1989 and 2003. Bárány has been the chairman of the Kungliga Vetenskaps Societeten in Uppsala since 1994, and of the Kungliga Vetenskapsakademien since 2005. He was earlier the chairman of the Nobel Museum.

Bárány was given the honour of being the host of the radio show Sommar i P1 at Sveriges Radio P1 on 30 June 2014.

Bárány was yelled at by the presidium at the Vetenskapsakademien for revealing in Sveriges Radio as to why the announcement of the winner of the Nobel Prize in Physics 2013 was delayed.

== Personal life ==
Bárány is the son of Ernst Bárány and psychiatrist Margit Boman-Bárány, and the grandson of Nobel prize recipient Róbert Bárány. He is the father of Sigrid Bárány, who was winner of the cooking show Sveriges mästerkock, broadcast on TV4 in 2012.
