= Christina Moberg =

Swedish organic chemist

- Born: 1947 (age 78–79)
- Education: KTH Royal Institute of Technology
- Scientific career
- Workplaces: KTH Royal Institute of Technology; Pierre and Marie Curie University
- Thesis: Nickelocene, cobaltocene, and cyclopentadienyl (tributylphosphine)-copper in organic synthesis. (1975)

Christina Moberg (born 1947) is a Swedish chemist who is a professor of Organic Chemistry at the KTH Royal Institute of Technology. She was elected an Honorary Fellow of the Royal Society of Chemistry in 2017. She has been president of the Royal Swedish Academy of Sciences, has been elected as a fellow of the Royal Swedish Academy of Sciences, the Royal Swedish Academy of Engineering Sciences, and was awarded the Göran Gustafsson Prize and the L'Ordre National de Merite.

== Early life and education ==
Moberg was born in Sweden. She attended Stockholm University for her graduate studies, where she studied chemistry and graduated in 1975. She completed her doctoral studies at the KTH Royal Institute of Technology. Her doctorate considered nickelocene, cobaltocene and cyclopentadienyl (tributylphosphine)-copper in organic synthesis. After earning her doctorate under the supervision of Professor Martin Nilsson, Moberg moved to the Pierre and Marie Curie University (then University of Paris 6), where she worked with Jean Normant. She returned to the KTH Royal Institute of Technology in 1967, joining the laboratory of Björn Åkermark.

== Research and career ==
In 1978, Moberg was appointed to the faculty at the KTH Royal Institute of Technology, where she was promoted to Full Professor in 1997. Her research considers organic synthesis. She is particularly interested in asymmetric synthesis and the creation of molecules with non-superimposable mirror symmetry.

Alongside her work in asymmetric synthesis, Moberg is interested in supramolecular chemistry. In an interview with the European Academies' Science Advisory Council (EASAC), Moberg explained “... if you think of atoms as letters, then molecules are words. A supra-molecule is a whole sentence, because it's made of separate molecules which interact”.

== Awards and honours ==
- 1998 Elected to the Royal Swedish Academy of Sciences
- 1998 Elected to the Royal Swedish Academy of Engineering Sciences
- 1998 Göran Gustafsson Prize "for her achievements in synthetic organic chemistry, particularly for the methods with which she succeeded in solving the problem of dangerous mirror forms of molecules"
- 1999 L'Ordre National de Merite
- 2001 University of Gothenburg Sixten Heyman
- 2006 Uppsala University Ulla och Stig Holmquist
- 2013 Elected to the Danish National Research Foundation
- 2015 Appointed President of the Royal Swedish Academy of Sciences
- 2016 Swedish royal family the King's Medal
- 2017 Elected an Honorary Fellow of the Royal Society of Chemistry
- 2017 Elected to the European Academy of Sciences and Arts
- 2018 Elected to the Academia Europaea
- 2020 Elected President of the European Academies' Science Advisory Council

== Selected publications ==
- Mats Larhed; Christina Moberg; Anders Hallberg (1 September 2002). "Microwave-accelerated homogeneous catalysis in organic chemistry". Accounts of Chemical Research. 35 (9): 717–727. doi:10.1021/ar010074v. ISSN 0001-4842. PMID 12234201. Wikidata Q31109480.
- Irina Beletskaya; Christina Moberg (1 June 2006). "Element-element additions to unsaturated carbon-carbon bonds catalyzed by transition metal complexes". Chemical Reviews. 106 (6): 2320–2354. doi:10.1021/cr050530j. ISSN 0009-2665. PMID 16771452. Wikidata Q83983367.
- Irina Beletskaya; Christina Moberg (1 December 1999). "Element−Element Addition to Alkynes Catalyzed by the Group 10 Metals". Chemical Reviews. 99 (12): 3435–3462. doi:10.1021/cr9902594. ISSN 0009-2665. PMID 11849027. Wikidata Q77647012.
- Christina Moberg (1 February 1998). "C3 Symmetry in Asymmetric Catalysis and Chiral Recognition". Angewandte Chemie International Edition. 37 (3): 248–268. doi:10.1002/(sici)1521-3773(19980216)37:3<248::aid-anie248>3.0.co;2-5. ISSN 1433-7851. PMID 29711253. Wikidata Q88519999.
