= Arne Ölander =

Swedish chemist

Gustav Arne Ölander
- Born: 31 December 1902; Stockholm
- Died: 13 May 1984 (aged 81)
- Occupation: chemist
- Parents: Gustaf Ölander (father); Hilda Ölander née Norrman (mother)

Gustav Arne Ölander (31 December 1902 in Stockholm – 13 May 1984 in Stockholm) was a Swedish chemist, known for his discovery of the shape-memory effect in metal alloys. He was the son of Gustaf Ölander and Hilda Ölander née Norrman.

Ölander became an associate professor of physical chemistry at Stockholm University in 1929. He was a professor of theoretical chemistry and electrochemistry at the Royal Institute of Technology 1936–1943, in inorganic and physical chemistry at Stockholm University 1943–1960, and in physical chemistry at Stockholm University 1960–1968.

Arne Ölander became a member of the Academy of Engineering in 1943, was secretary of the Academy of Sciences Nobel Committees from 1943 to 1965, committee member of the International Union of Pure and Applied Chemistry (IUPAC) from 1949 to 1971, where he was primarily engaged in issues related to chemical nomenclature. He was a director of the Swedish Defense Research Establishment (1955–1968), Member of the Academy of Sciences in 1956, and a Director at the National Science Research Council (1958–1965). Ölander was a member of the Atomic Weights Commission and a member of the Nobel Committee for Chemistry (1965–1974).
