= Pernilla Wittung-Stafshede =

Swedish biophysical chemist

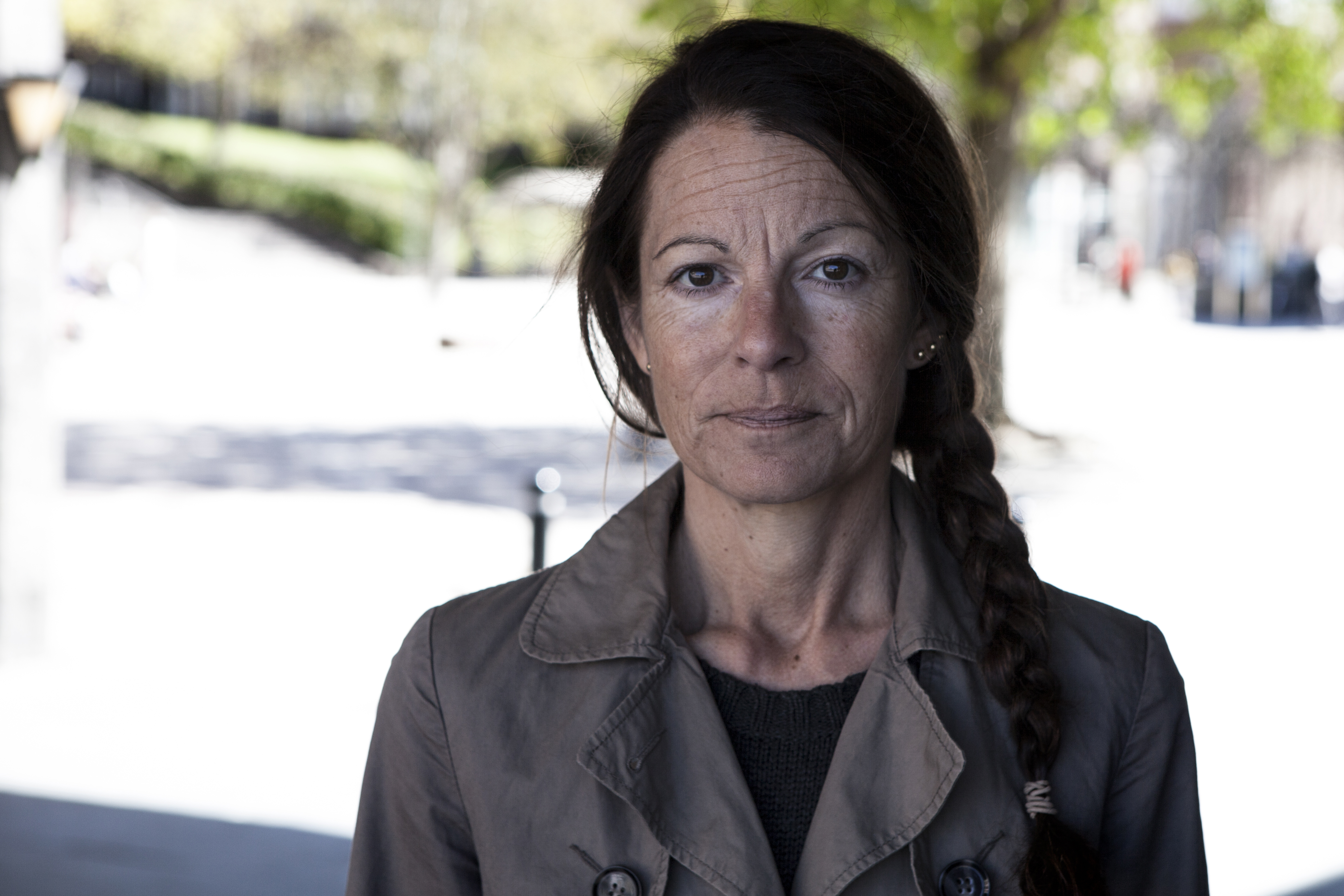
- Born: August 31, 1968 (age 58); Umeå, Sweden
- Citizenship: Swedish and American
- Education: Chalmers University of Technology
- Children: Selma and Hilda
- Scientific career
- Fields: Biochemistry, Biophysics, Chemistry
- Workplaces: California Institute of Technology, Tulane University, Rice University, Umeå University, Chalmers University
- Thesis: Intelligent nucleic acid interactions with peptide nucleic acids and in recombination proteins (1996)
- Doctoral advisor: Bengt Nordén

Pernilla Wittung-Stafshede (maiden name Wittung) is a Swedish biophysical chemist, born in 1968, who is a professor of Chemistry at Rice University in Houston, Texas, USA. In 2019 she was named by International Union of Pure and Applied Chemistry as a Distinguished Woman in Chemistry.

== Education ==
She received her Master of Science Degree in Engineering from Chalmers University of Technology and a doctorate at the same institution in 1996 in biophysical chemistry under Bengt Nordén, with a thesis entitled Intelligent nucleic acid interactions with peptide nucleic acids and in recombination proteins.

== Employment ==
After her Ph.D., she worked for twelve years in the United States at the California Institute of Technology, Beckman Institute in Pasadena, California (1997–98), Tulane University in New Orleans, Louisiana(1999-2003) and Rice University in Houston, Texas (2004-2008). In 2008, she returned to Sweden to a professor position at Umeå University. From 2015 to 2025 she was a professor at Chalmers University of Technology and was the head of the Chemical Biology division for the first 3 years.

In July, 2025, she moved to Rice University in Houston, Texas, to become the Charles W. Duncan, Jr.-Welch Professor of Chemistry. Concurrently she received an Established Investigator Award as a CPRIT Scholar.

She leads a research group that focuses on the biophysical properties of proteins; both metal-transporting proteins and proteins that fold incorrectly and clump together. The research is basic science, but has links to diseases such as Alzheimer's, Parkinson's and cancer.

In 2010, Pernilla Wittung-Stafshede was one of ten researchers in Sweden, appointed as a Wallenberg Scholar, receiving a grant awarded by the Knut and Alice Wallenberg Foundation that she has renewed several times (most recently in 2024). In 2017 she was elected a member of the council of Biophysical Society (BPS). It was the second time ever for a Swedish scientist; the first one was Arne Engström 1960–1963.

In 2020, she became a member of the Nobel Prize in Chemistry Committee, and since 2021 she is a council member for The Lindau Nobel Laureate Meetings. In 2019 she started Genie at Chalmers, a 300 MSEK gender equality initiative funded by the Chalmers Foundation and led it for four years.

== Awards and honors ==
Pernilla Wittung-Stafshede has received a number of awards and prizes. These include:

- National Fresenius Award in 2003, awarded by the American Chemical Society Phi Lambda Upsilon to young eminent chemistry researchers.
- Göran Gustafsson Prize in Chemistry in 2009, awarded by the Göran Gustafsson Foundation and the Royal Swedish Academy of Sciences.
- Wallmark Prize in 2009, awarded by the Royal Swedish Academy of Sciences.
- STIAS fellow in 2013, awarded by the Stellenbosch Institute for Advanced Studies, South Africa.
- Svante Arrhenius plaque in 2016, awarded by the Swedish Chemical Society in collaboration with the Royal Swedish Academy of Sciences.
- Elected member of the Royal Swedish Academy of Sciences, 2016.
- Elected member of the Royal Society of Arts and Sciences in Gothenburg, 2016.
- 2019 International Union of Pure and Applied Chemistry Distinguished Woman in Chemistry
- Elected as a member, Academia Europaea, 2017
- Gustav Dalén Medal, 2019
- Elected member Royal Swedish Academy Engineering Sciences, 2020
- Selected as Biophysical Society Fellow, 2022
- Selected as Honorary Fellow of the Royal Society of Chemistry (HonFRSC), 2024
- Elected as Fellow of the European Academy of Sciences, 2024
- Elected as Foreign Member of the Finnish Society of Sciences and Letters, 2024

== Bibliography ==
Pernilla has published several hundred scientific peer-reviewed articles since her first in 1994 and numerous popular articles. Full list on her ORCID or Scopus sites.

== Personal life ==
Wittung-Stafshede has two daughters, Selma and Hilda Stafshede. Pernilla has two sisters, Paulina and Petronella.
