= Carl Nordling =

Swedish physicist

Carl Nordling (6 February 1931 – 1 April 2016) was a Swedish physicist who was a professor of physics at Uppsala University. He was a member of the Royal Swedish Academy of Sciences and served as the chairman of the Nobel Committee for Physics.

== Publications ==
- Physics handbook: Elementary constants and units, tables, formulae and diagrams, and mathematical formulae
  - 4th edition 1987: Chartwell-Bratt: ISBN 978-3-88598-007-0, Studentlitteratur AB ISBN 978-0-86238-000-7
  - Studentlitteratur, 2004: ISBN 978-91-44-03152-1
- How to get the Nobel Prize in physics - Physica Scripta 1995 T59 21-25 doi:10.1088/0031-8949/1995/T59/001
