= Bengt Nordén =

Swedish chemist

Bengt Johan Fredrik Nordén
- Born: May 15, 1945 (age 81); Lund, Sweden
- Education: Lund University, Chalmers University of Technology
- Known for: DNA research, Linear dichroism spectroscopy
- Awards: The Göran Gustafsson Prize (1992)
- Scientific career
- Fields: Chemistry, Inorganic chemistry
- Workplaces: Chalmers University of Technology

Bengt Johan Fredrik Nordén (born 15 May 1945 in Lund, Sweden) is a Swedish chemist and Professor of Physical Chemistry at Chalmers University of Technology in Gothenburg, Sweden.

== Early life and education ==
Nordén was born on 15 May 1945 in Lund, Sweden. He studied chemistry, theoretical physics, and mathematics at Lund University, completing a Master of Science degree in 1967.

He completed his PhD in inorganic chemistry at Lund University in 1971. His early academic training was in physical and inorganic chemistry, with later specialization in biophysical chemistry and spectroscopy.

== Academic career ==
Nordén was appointed Associate Professor (docent) of Inorganic Chemistry at Lund University in 1972, where he remained until 1979.

In 1979, he was appointed Professor of Physical Chemistry at Chalmers University of Technology, where he has remained since. At Chalmers, he has been involved in research and teaching in physical chemistry, with a focus on molecular spectroscopy and biomolecular systems.

He has held visiting appointments at several universities, including the University of Copenhagen, the University of Oregon, the University of Utah, and the California Institute of Technology.

== Research ==
Nordén's early research at Lund University concerned the interaction between chiral photons (circularly polarized light) and chiral molecules. This work included photochemical experiments in which circularly polarized irradiation was used to produce optical activity in racemic samples. It sparked his interest in circular dichroism, which he later combined with linear dichroism to obtain three-dimensional structural information on DNA complexes.

He was also interested in the origin of homochirality, the fact that life is built from molecules of a single handedness. He addressed the question in a 1977 paper in Nature and in a 1978 paper in the Journal of Molecular Evolution which have been regarded as important contributions to his work.

Nordén's research focuses on optical linear dichroism spectroscopy, often combined with circular dichroism, and its application to biomolecular structure and interactions.

His work includes studies of DNA-binding molecules and nucleic acid recognition processes. These include investigations of bis-intercalating ligands and peptide nucleic acids (PNA), which are synthetic analogues of DNA used in molecular recognition studies.

He has also contributed to the study of DNA–ligand interactions, including transitions between groove-binding and intercalation binding modes in nucleic acid complexes.

Another area of research involves spectroscopic methods for studying DNA–protein interactions, including recombination proteins such as RecA and Rad51, which are involved in homologous recombination and DNA repair processes.

In addition, he has worked on applying spectroscopic techniques to study membrane proteins in native lipid environments, contributing to structural studies of biologically relevant membrane systems.

== Academic and institutional service ==
Nordén has served in advisory and research governance roles in Sweden. He was a scientific advisor to the Swedish government between 1992 and 1994.

He was also a member of the Swedish Research Council (formerly the Natural Science Research Council) from 1986 to 1992 and later chaired its chemistry section.

== Nobel Committee for Chemistry ==
Nordén served as a member of the Nobel Committee for Chemistry from 1994 to 2005 and was chairman of the committee from 2000 to 2003.

== Awards and honors ==
Nordén received the Göran Gustafsson Prize in Chemistry in 1992 from the Royal Swedish Academy of Sciences. He also received the Fabian Gyllenborg Prize from Lund University in 1972.

== Academy and organizational memberships ==
Nordén is a member of several scientific academies. He has been a member of the Royal Swedish Academy of Sciences since 1991.

He is also a member of the Royal Swedish Academy of Engineering Sciences, the Royal Physiographic Society in Lund (since 1992), and the Royal Society of Arts and Sciences in Gothenburg (since 1984).

He is a member of several foreign academies, including the German National Academy of Sciences Leopoldina, the Norwegian Academy of Science and Letters, the Finnish Society of Sciences and Letters, and The World Academy of Sciences (TWAS).

He is also a member of Academia Europaea.

== Molecular Frontiers ==
Nordén founded the Molecular Frontiers Foundation in 2007 under the auspices of the Royal Swedish Academy of Sciences.

The foundation is a non-profit initiative focused on promoting dialogue in molecular science and supporting scientific engagement activities for students and early-career researchers.

== Additional roles ==
Nordén has participated in international scientific evaluation and advisory activities, including service on committees related to research funding and scientific awards in Europe.

He has also been involved in scientific publishing and editorial activities in the field of biophysics.

== See also ==
- Official website of Bengt Nordén
- Nordén's lab
- Molecular Frontiers Foundation web site
- MoleClues.org
