= Björkén Prize =

Scientific award given by Uppsala University

The Björkén Prize (Swedish: Björkénska priset) is a scientific award given by Uppsala University. It is awarded for outstanding research in science and the theoretical branches of medicine. The prize was established in 1893 from a donation given by university lecturer John Björkén (1833–1893). Björkén was a physician and medical assistant professor in surgery and obstetrics at Uppsala. The prize was first awarded in 1902 on the day of his death.

The Björkén Prize is alternately awarded for achievement in four different fields:

- Botany, zoology, and landscape planning
- Chemistry, mineralogy, metallurgy, and geology
- Physics, mechanics, and engineering science
- Theoretical disciplines of medical sciences

== Winners ==
- 1902 – Tycho Tullberg
- 1903 – Olof Hammarsten
- 1904 – Alfred Elis Törnebohm
- 1905 – Knut Ångström
- 1906 – Allvar Gullstrand
- 1907 – Arvid Högbom
- 1908 – Gustaf Gröndal
- 1909 – August Hammar
- 1910 – Ivar Fredholm
- 1911 – Gottfrid A. Adlerz & Herman Nilsson-Ehle
- 1912 – Sven Gustaf Hedin
- 1913 – Henrik Munthe & The Svedberg
- 1914 – Carl Wilhelm Oseen
- 1915 – Carl Thore Mörner
- 1916 – Svante Murbeck
- 1917 – Gerard De Geer
- 1918 – Alfred Pettersson
- 1919 – Carl Wilhelm Oseen & Manne Siegbahn
- 1920 – Oscar Juel
- 1921 – Ivar Broman
- 1922 – Ernhold Hede & Sven Odén
- 1923 – Manne Siegbahn & The Svedberg
- 1924 – John Forssman & Gustaf Göthlin
- 1925 – Elias Melin & Erik Stensiö
- 1926 – The Svedberg
- 1927 – Torsten Thunberg
- 1928 – Carl Wilhelm Oseen
- 1929 – Erik Stensiö
- 1930 – Göran Liljestrand & Carl Næslund
- 1931 – Bror Holmberg
- 1932 – Erik Hulthén
- 1933 – Carl Kling
- 1934 – Nils Holmgren
- 1935 – Arne Westgren & Gregori Aminoff
- 1936 – Hugo Theorell
- 1937 – Erik Bäcklin & Oskar Klein
- 1938 – Sven Ekman
- 1939 – Erik Widmark
- 1940 – Arvid Hedvall & Arne Tiselius
- 1941 – Torsten Carleman & Bengt Edlén
- 1942 – Einar Hammarsten
- 1943 – Rudolf Florin & Gunnar Säve-Söderbergh
- 1944 – Gunnar Hägg
- 1945 – Torbjörn Caspersson
- 1946 – Hannes Alfvén & Nils Ryde
- 1947 – Nils Svedelius
- 1948 – Ragnar Granit
- 1949 – Ole Lamm & Harry von Eckermann
- 1950 – No prize awarded.
- 1951 – Jörgen Lehmann
- 1952 – Erik Jarvik & John Runnström
- 1953 – Arne Fredga
- 1954 – Arne Engström
- 1955 – Hilding Köhler & Kai Siegbahn
- 1956 – Erik Hultén
- 1957 – Torsten Teorell
- 1958 – Erik Norin
- 1959 – Gudmund Borelius
- 1960 – Gunnar Blixt
- 1961 – Heinrichs Skuja
- 1962 – Einar Stenhagen
- 1963 – Börje Uvnäs
- 1964 – Ivar Waller
- 1965 – Bertil Kullenberg
- 1966 – Sune Bergström
- 1967 – Lars Gunnar Sillén
- 1968 – Bengt Edlén
- 1969 – Ernst Bárány
- 1970 – Per Eric Lindahl
- 1971 – Stig Claesson
- 1972 – Peter Reichard
- 1973 – Per-Olov Löwdin & Olof Rydbeck
- 1974 – Nils Fries & Sven Hörstadius
- 1975 – Albert Levan
- 1976 – Jerker Porath
- 1977 – Kai Siegbahn
- 1978 – Eva Klein & Georg Klein
- 1979 – Bengt Kihlman & Anders Rapp
- 1980 – Hans Ramberg & Eric Welin
- 1981 – Arvid Carlsson
- 1982 – Sven A.E. Johansson
- 1983 – Tore Hultin & Peter Perlmann
- 1984 – John Sjöquist & Lars Terenius
- 1985 – Stellan Hjertén
- 1986 – Ingemar Lundström
- 1987 – Viktor Mutt
- 1988 – Hans G. Boman
- 1989 – Mats Hillert & Richard A. Reyment
- 1990 – Torvard C. Laurent
- 1991 – Ingmar Bergström
- 1992 – Carl-Ivar Brändén & Tage Eriksson
- 1993 – Lore Zech
- 1994 – Jan Backman & Håkan Wennerström
- 1995 – Arne Johansson & Erik B. Karlsson
- 1996 – Karl-Erik Hagbarth
- 1997 – Malte Andersson
- 1998 – Jan Bergström & Gunnar von Heijne
- 1999 – Lennart Philipson & Jan Pontén
- 2000 – Sven Kullander
- 2001 – Birgitta Bergman
- 2002 – Bengt Westermark
- 2003 – Jan-Erling Bäckvall
- 2004 – Börje Johansson & Peter Stoica
- 2005 – Lars Olson
- 2006 – Karna Lidmar-Bergström & Thomas Nyström
- 2007 – Astrid Gräslund & Svante Björck
- 2008 – Kurt Nordström
- 2009 – Tord Ekelöf & Mats Leijon
- 2010 – Måns Ehrenberg
- 2011 – Ulf Landegren
- 2012 – Anders Lindroth & Bengt Mannervik
- 2013 – Olle Eriksson & Erik Hagersten
- 2014 – Leif Wide
- 2015 – Sandra Baldauf
- 2016 – Anders Hagfeldt & Auli Niemi
- 2017 – Leif Andersson & Kerstin Lindblad-Toh
- 2018 – Joseph Minahan & Maria Strømme
- 2019 – Per E. Ahlberg & Lars Holmer
- 2020 – Christer Betsholtz
- 2021 – Kristina Edström
- 2022 – Marika Edoff and Nikolai Piskunov
- 2023 – Dan I. Andersson and Lena Claesson-Welsh
