= List of Swedish scientists =

This is a list of Swedish scientists.

== Archaeology ==
- Lili Kaelas (1919–2007), Stone and Bronze Age archaeologist

== Biology and environmental science ==
- Albertina Carlsson (1848–1930), zoologist
- Augusta Christie-Linde (1870–1953), zoologist
- Jonas C. Dryander (1748–1810), botanist
- Eva Ekeblad (1724–1786), agronomist
- Erik Leonard Ekman (1883–1931), botanist
- Elias Magnus Fries (1794–1878), botanist
- AnnMari Jansson (1934–2007), systems ecologist
- Pehr Kalm (1716–1779), botanist
- Carl Linnaeus (1707–1778), botanist, "father of taxonomy"
- René Malaise (1892–1978), entomologist
- Lisbeth Olsson (born 1963), professor in industrial biotechnology
- Johan Rockström (born 1965), professor in environmental science and executive director of the Stockholm Resilience Centre
- Olaus Rudbeckius, junior (1660–1740), botanist
- Daniel Solander (1733–1782), botanist
- Peter Gustaf Tengmalm (1754–1803), naturalist

== Chemistry ==
- Johan August Arfwedson (1792–1841), chemist
- Svante Arrhenius (1859–1927), chemist and physicist
- Karin Aurivillius (1920–1982), chemist and crystallographer
- Jöns Jacob Berzelius (1779–1848), chemist
- Lars Ernster (1920–1998), biochemistry, member of the board of the Nobel Foundation
- Christina Lampe-Önnerud (born 1967), chemist
- Bengt Mannervik (born 1943), biochemist
- Alfred Nobel (1833–1896), chemist and founder of the Nobel Prizes
- Gösta Pettersson (born 1937), biochemist
- Carl Wilhelm Scheele (1742–1786), chemist
- Theodor Svedberg (1884–1971), chemist

== Computer science and numerical analysis ==
- Björn Engquist (born 1945), numerical analysis
- Johan Håstad (born 1960), theoretical computer science
- Laila Ohlgren (1937–2014), telecommunications

== Engineering ==
- Nils Alwall (1904–86), inventor and engineer
- Arne Asplund (1903–1993), inventor and engineer
- Karl Johan Åström (born 1934), engineer, control theorist
- Nils Bohlin (1920–2002), inventor and engineer
- Marianne Kärrholm (1921–2018), chemical engineer and professor
- Ingrid Bruce (1940–2012), engineer and trade unionist
- Gustaf Dalén (1869–1937), inventor and engineer
- Rune Elmqvist (1906–1996), inventor and engineer
- John Ericsson (1803–1889), inventor and engineer
- Lars Magnus Ericsson (1846–1926), inventor and engineer
- Carl Edvard Johansson (1864–1943), inventor and engineer
- Johan Petter Johansson (1864–1943), inventor and engineer
- Håkan Lans (born 1947), inventor and engineer
- Gustaf de Laval (1845–1913), inventor and engineer
- Frans Wilhelm Lindqvist (1862–1931), inventor and engineer
- Mats Lindroos (1961–2025), physicist
- Carl Rickard Nyberg (1858–1939), inventor and engineer
- Gustaf Erik Pasch (1788–1862), inventor and engineer
- Baltzar von Platen (1898–1984), inventor and engineer
- Erik Wallenberg (1915–1999), inventor and engineer
- Waloddi Weibull (1887–1979), material scientist
- Jonas Wenström (1855–1893), inventor and engineer
- Sven Wingquist (1876–1953), inventor and engineer
- Lars Bern (born 1942), engineer

== Geology and geography ==
- Arne Bjerhammar (1917–2011), geodesy
- Torsten Hägerstrand (1916–2004), geography
- Adolf Erik Nordenskiöld (1832–1901), geology, Arctic explorer
- Otto Nordenskiöld (1869–1928), geology, explorer

== Mathematics ==
- Albert Victor Bäcklund (1845–1922)
- Arne Beurling (1905–1986), analysis
- Lennart Carleson (born 1928), analysis
- Per Enflo (born 1944), analysis
- Sture Eskilsson (1930–2016), economist
- Erik Ivar Fredholm (1866–1927), analysis
- Olle Häggström (born 1967), mathematical statistics
- Lars Hörmander (1931–2012), analysis
- Helge von Koch (1870–1924), analysis
- Sonja Kovalevskaya (1850–1891), analysis, partial differential equations
- Anders Martin-Löf (born 1940), analysis and mathematical physics
- Per Martin-Löf (born 1942), logic, statistics, and computer science
- Gösta Mittag-Leffler (1846–1927), analysis

== Medicine ==
- Arvid Carlsson (1923–2018), neuroscientist
- Ulf von Euler (1905–1983), physiologist and pharmacologist
- Björn Folkow (1921–2012), physiologist
- Allvar Gullstrand (1862–1930), medicine
- Olaus Rudbeckius (1630–1702), medicine
- Ellen Sandelin (1862–1907) practicing physician in Stockholm, who received her medical license in 1897
- Emily Spörck (1825–1904), early woman doctor of medicine, graduated as a physician in Chicago in 1873
- Stina Stenhagen (1916–1973), medical biochemist
- Hugo Theorell (1903–1982), medicine
- Charlotte Yhlen (1839–1920), early woman doctor of medicine, graduated as a physician in Pennsylvania in 1873

== Physics and astronomy ==
- Hannes Alfvén (1908–1995), physicist
- Anders Jonas Ångström (1814–1874), physicist
- Oskar Backlund (1846–1916), astronomer
- Anders Celsius (1701–1744), astronomer
- Bengt Edlén (1906–1993), physicist
- Carl David Anderson (1905 - 1991), physicist
- V. Walfrid Ekman (1874–1954), physical oceanographer
- Oskar Klein (1894–1977), physicist
- Per-Olov Löwdin (1916–2000), physicist
- Knut Lundmark (1889–1958), astronomer
- Lise Meitner (1878–1968), nuclear physicist
- Christopher Polhem (1661–1751), physicist
- Carl-Gustaf Rossby (1898–1957), meteorologist
- Janne Rydberg (1854–1919), physicist
- Manne Siegbahn (1886–1978), physicist
- Kai Siegbahn (1918–2007), physicist
- Rolf Maximilian Sievert (1896–1966), medical physicist
- Karin Öberg (born 1982), astrochemist

== Social sciences ==
- Pär-Erik Back (1920–1988), social scientist
- Alvar Ellegård (1919–2008), linguistics, confessional beliefs
- Phebe Fjellström (1924–2007), ethnologist
- Orvar Löfgren (born 1943), ethnologist
- Margareta Wahlström (born 1950), senior UN official

== Statistics and data science ==
- Harald Cramér (1893–1985), mathematical statistics
- Ulf Grenander (1923–2016), stochastic processes and pattern recognition
- Karl Gustav Jöreskog (born 1935), multivariate analysis
- Olav Kallenberg (born 1939), probability
- Gunnar Kulldorff (1927–2015), estimation and survey sampling
- Herman Wold (1908–1992), econometrics and time series analysis

== See also ==
- List of Swedes
- Lists of scientists
- Nobel Prize
- Royal Swedish Academy of Sciences
