= Eva Maria Fenyö =

Swedish physician and professor

Eva Maria Fenyö is a Hungarian-Swedish scientist who became the emeritus professor of virology at Lund University.

== Life ==
Fenyö was married to Egon Fenyö from 1964 until his death in 2006. They had one son, David Fenyö, who is a computational biologist and physicist, Professor in the Department of Biochemistry and Molecular Pharmacology at NYU Langone Medical Center.

== Education ==
She began her medical studies in 1960 at the Semmelweis University in Budapest, where her career choices were constrained by the political situation in Hungary. She moved to Sweden in 1965 where she engaged in research at the Department of Tumor Biology, Karolinska Institute (KI), under the supervision of George and Eva Klein. In parallel with research, she continued her medical studies and in 1974 she obtained a PhD in tumor biology and in 1975 a medical degree at KI.

== Career ==
Fenyö’s research focused on retrovirus-host cell interactions. Experience from the mouse leukemia virus field was transferred to human and simian immunodeficiency viruses (HIV and SIV) and enabled the formulation of two basic concepts for HIV/AIDS. One concerned HIV biological variability^{,}^{,} that governs the virus ability to infect different cells and is tightly linked with the severity of infection. The other concept concerned emergence of neutralisation resistant virus variants^{,}^{,} that evade antibodies of the infected host.

Initial ground-breaking work addressed several aspects of HIV/AIDS. Fenyö found that HIV was present in the cerebrospinal fluid of HIV infected people and pioneered the field of mother-to-child transmission of HIV^{,}. She explored the biological variability of the less pathogenic HIV-2 and showed that HIV-2 infection mitigates subsequent HIV-1 infection of the same host.

Fenyö carried out HIV vaccine research within the framework of several international networks. Long-lasting collaboration, initiated in 1989, was established with WHO (later WHO-UNAIDS). The WHO-UNAIDS Network for HIV Isolation and Characterization (coordinated by the WHO-UNAIDS HIV Vaccine Initiative) performed the first, systematic world-wide survey of HIV isolates.

In 1981 Fenyö became a lecturer in virology and in 1997 a professor at the Karolinska Institute, Stockholm. In 1999 she became professor of virology at the Medical Faculty of Lund University, Lund, Sweden.

== Awards and honors ==
Fenyö became a current fellow of the Royal Physiographic Society in Lund in 2001.

== Selected publications ==
- Fenyö, E M; Morfeldt-Månson, L; Chiodi, F; Lind, B; von Gegerfelt, A; Albert, J; Olausson, E; Asjö, B (1988). "Distinct replicative and cytopathic characteristics of human immunodeficiency virus isolates". Journal of Virology. 62 (11): 4414–4419. doi:10.1128/jvi.62.11.4414-4419.1988. PMC 253886. PMID 2459416.
- Berger, E. A.; Doms, R. W.; Fenyö, E.-M.; Korber, B. T. M.; Littman, D. R.; Moore, J. P.; Sattentau, Q. J.; Schuitemaker, H.; Sodroski, J.; Weiss, R. A. (1998). "A new classification for HIV-1". Nature. 391 (6664): 240. Bibcode:1998Natur.391..240B. doi:10.1038/34571. ISSN 0028-0836. PMID 9440686.
