= Sven Kullander =

Sven Kullander is the name of:

- Sven Kullander (physicist) (1936–2014), Swedish physicist, Professor Emeritus at Uppsala University
- Sven O. Kullander (born 1952), Swedish biologist specialising in ichthyology, first steward at the Swedish Museum of Natural History in Stockholm
