= Sporck =

Sporck is a surname. Notable people with the surname include:

- August Geelmuyden Spørck (1851–1928), Norwegian military officer and politician
- Casper Sporck (1922–1945), Dutch volunteer soldier in the Waffen-SS
- Charles E. Sporck (born 1928), American engineer and industrialist
- Emily Spörck (1825–1904), Swedish physician
- Franz Anton von Sporck (1662–1738), Central European cultural figure
- Franz Karl Rudolph von Swéerts-Reist und von Sporck (1688–1757), Dutch-Bohemian nobleman
- Georges Sporck (1870–1943), French composer
- Jan Rudolf von Sporck (1696–1759), Czech bishop
- Jo Sporck (born 1953), Dutch composer
- Johann von Sporck (1595–1679), German nobleman and military leader
- Johann Franz Christian von Sweerts-Sporck (1729–1802), Bohemian nobleman
- Johan Henrik Spørck (1778–1849), Nordic military officer
- Johann Rudolf von Sporck (1755–1806), Austrian general
- Johann Wenzel von Spork (1724–1804), Bohemian politician
- Jørgen Fredrik Spørck (1787–1866), Norwegian military officer and politician
- Mimi Spørck (1857–1930), Norwegian women's advocate
