= Julius Rebek =

Hungarian-American chemist (born 1944)

Julius Rebek

Julius Rebek Jr. (born Gyula Rebek on April 11, 1944) is a Hungarian-American chemist and expert on molecular self-assembly.

Rebek was born in Beregszász, Kingdom of Hungary, (present-day Berehove, Ukraine), which at the time was part of Hungary, in 1944 and lived in Austria from 1945 to 1949. In 1949 he and his family immigrated to the United States and settled in Topeka, Kansas where he graduated from Highland Park High School. Rebek graduated from the University of Kansas with a Bachelor of Arts degree in chemistry. Rebek received his Master of Arts degree and his Ph.D. in organic chemistry from the Massachusetts Institute of Technology in 1970. There he studied peptides under D. S. Kemp.

Rebek was an assistant professor at the University of California at Los Angeles from 1970 to 1976. There he developed the three-phase test for reactive intermediates. In 1976, he moved to the University of Pittsburgh, where he developed cleft-like structures for studies in molecular recognition. In 1989 he returned to MIT, where he became the Camille Dreyfus Professor of Chemistry and devised synthetic, self-replicating molecules. In July 1996, he moved his research group to the Scripps Research Institute to become the director of the Skaggs Institute for Chemical Biology, where he continues to work in molecular recognition and self-assembling systems.

Rebek is a member of the National Academy of Sciences.

== Three-phase test ==
Rebek's independent research began in the 1970s, with a method to detect reactive intermediates. This was invented through application of polymer-bound reagents. A precursor for the reactive intermediate was covalently attached to one solid phase while a trap was attached to a second such support. When transfer takes place between the solid phases, it requires the existence of a reactive intermediate, free in solution as shown below. Among the reactive species detected by this "Three Phase Test" were cyclobutadiene, singlet oxygen, monomeric metaphosphate, and acyl imidazoles.

== Molecular machine ==
A model of the Pauling principle - catalysis by maximum binding to the transition state – was devised in 1978. A physical process, the racemization of bipyridyl, was chosen. The transition structure features coplanar aryl rings and a specific binding force (the chelation of a metal by bipyridyl), and shows maximum metal/ligand attraction at the coplanar geometry. The biaryl bond acts like a fulcrum and binding induces a mechanical stress elsewhere in the molecule. This was one of the first molecular machines, a rotor.

== Synthetic model of allosteric effects ==
Other bipyridyls and biphenyls were designed in the 1980s as synthetic models of allosteric effects shown below. One involved two identical and mechanically coupled binding sites and it showed positive cooperativity in binding of covalent mercury compounds. Rotors are still the most frequent chemical models for allosteric effects, and are present in many of the molecular machines pursued in other laboratories today.

== Molecular recognition ==
Efforts in molecular recognition in the 1980s, led to cleft-like shapes for recognition of ions and especially nonionic targets. Using derivatives of Kemp's triacid, Rebek arranged functional groups that "converged" to create a recognition site. Shown above is a bisimide that chelates adenine in water. Versions with carboxyl groups became widely used elsewhere as models for metalloenzymes (the XDK structures) and in Rebek's laboratory to probe stereoelectronic effects.

== Self-replication ==
In 1990, these studies culminated in a synthetic, self-complementary that acted as a template for its own formation. It showed autocatalysis based on molecular recognition and was the first synthetic system to show a primitive sign of life: self-replication. Tjivikua, T.; Ballester, P.; Rebek, J. (1990). "Self-replicating system". Journal of the American Chemical Society. 112 (3). American Chemical Society (ACS): 1249–1250. Bibcode:1990JAChS.112.1249T. doi:10.1021/ja00159a057. ISSN 0002-7863. The template grasps the reactants by hydrogen bonding at both ends as indicated below. The self-complementary "recipe" has been incorporated universally in self-replicating systems synthesized in other research groups.

Philip Ball in his book, Designing the Molecular World, argues that Rebek's self-replicating molecules share some criteria with both nucleic acids and proteins and, moreover, "their replications operates according to novel kind of molecular interaction rather than mimicking the complementarity base pairing of nucleic acids. One could view this as an indication that perhaps DNA is not the sine qua non of life, so that one might conceive of organisms that 'live' according to completely different molecular principles." He suggests that Rebek has been able to pursue the idea of "molecular 'evolution' by making artificial replicators that can be mutated. … The considerable excitement that has greeted Julius Rebek's work is inspired in part by the possibilities that it raises for exploring the kind of chemical processes that led to the appearance of life on our planet."

British ethologist Richard Dawkins in his book, River out of Eden, suggests that Rebek's replicating molecules "raise the possibility of other worlds having a parallel evolution [to Earth's] but with a fundamentally different chemical basis."

== Self assembly ==
Through collaboration with Javier de Mendoza in 1993, Rebek managed to create a self-assembling capsule. These form reversibly by completely surrounding small molecule targets and have become a versatile tool of modern physical organic chemistry. They exist in solution at equilibrium and under ambient conditions. They act as nanometric reaction chambers, as means to stabilize reagents, as sources of "complexes within complexes" and as spaces where new forms of stereochemistry have been created. They also inspired encapsulation in other research groups that use metal-ligand interactions for self-assembly. A cylindrical capsule of nanometric dimensions is shown above; it selects congruent guests singly or pairwise when the space inside is appropriately filled.

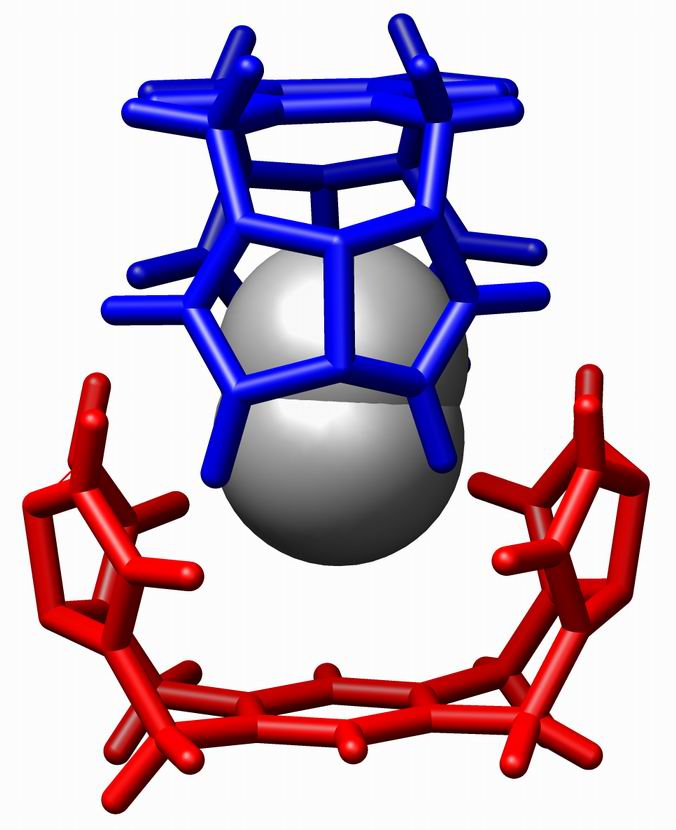
Nitrogen-Encapsulating Assembly

Richard Dawkins writes about autocatalysis as a potential explanation for abiogenesis in his 2004 book The Ancestor's Tale. He cites experiments performed by Julius Rebek and his colleagues at the Scripps Research Institute in California in which they combined amino adenosine and pentafluorophenyl ester with the autocatalyst amino adenosine triacid ester (AATE). One system from the experiment contained variants of AATE which catalysed the synthesis of themselves. This experiment demonstrated the possibility that autocatalysts could exhibit competition within a population of entities with heredity, which could be interpreted as a rudimentary form of natural selection.

== Protein Surface Mimetics ==
In recent years Rebek has pursued synthetic protein surface mimetics. Through a collaboration with Tamas Bartfai, these show promising biological activity in animal models of diseases.

== Positions held ==
- 1970-1976: Assistant Professor, University of California Los Angeles, Los Angeles, CA
- 1976-1979: Associate Professor, University of Pittsburgh, Pittsburgh, PA
- 1980-1989: Professor, University of Pittsburgh, Pittsburgh, PA
- 1989-1991: Professor, Massachusetts Institute of Technology, Cambridge, MA
- 1991-1996: Camille Dreyfus Prof. of Chemistry Massachusetts Institute of Technology, Cambridge, MA
- 1996–present: Director, Skaggs Institute for Chemical Biology, The Scripps Research Institute, La Jolla, CA

== Honors ==
- 1967-1970: National Science Foundation pre-doctoral fellow
- 1976-1974: Eli Lilly Award
- 1976-1978: A.P. Sloan Fellow
- 1981: Alexander von Humboldt Fellow
- 1986: Guggenheim Fellow
- 1990: Myron L. Bender and Muriel S. Bender Distinguished Summer Lecturer in Organic Chemistry, Northwestern University
- 1991: Arthur C. Cope Scholar Award
- 1993: American Academy of Arts and Sciences
- 1994: National Academy of Sciences
- 1995: Highland Park High School, Hall of Fame
- 1996: MERIT Award (National Institutes of Health)
- 1997: James Flack Norris Award in Physical Organic Chemistry (American Chemical Society)
- 2001: Hungarian Academy of Sciences
- 2002: Chemical Pioneer Award (American Institute of Chemists)
- 2004: Ronald Breslow Award for Achievement in Biomimetic Chemistry (American Chemical Society)
- 2005: Medal of the Academy of Sciences; Prague, Czech Republic
- 2005: Medal of the National Academy of Sciences, Letters and Arts; Modena, Italy
- 2005: European Academy of Science (Academia Europaea) Member
- 2011: William H. Nichols Medal
- 2012: Prelog Medal, ETH Zurich
- 2015: Honorary Doctorate, Jaume I University

== Relevant publications ==
- Rebek, J. (1979), "Mechanistic studies using solid supports: the three-phase test", Tetrahedron, 36 (6): 723–731, doi:10.1016/0040-4020(79)80087-3
- Bartfai T, Lu X, Badie-Mahdavi H, Barr AM, Mazarati A, Hua XY, Yaksh T, Haberhauer G, Ceide SC, Trembleau L, Somogyi L, Kröck L, Rebek J (July 2004). "Galmic, a nonpeptide galanin receptor agonist, affects behaviors in seizure, pain, and forced-swim tests". Proc. Natl. Acad. Sci. U.S.A. 101 (28): 10470–5. Bibcode:2004PNAS..10110470B. doi:10.1073/pnas.0403802101. PMC 478593. PMID 15240875.
- Davis CN, Mann E, Behrens MM, Gaidarova S, Rebek M, Rebek J, Bartfai T (February 2006). "MyD88-dependent and -independent signaling by IL-1 in neurons probed by bifunctional Toll/IL-1 receptor domain/BB-loop mimetics". Proc. Natl. Acad. Sci. U.S.A. 103 (8): 2953–8. Bibcode:2006PNAS..103.2953D. doi:10.1073/pnas.0510802103. PMC 1413805. PMID 16477040.
