= Tord Ekelöf =

Particle physicist

Tord Johan Carl Ekelöf (born 12 September 1945 in Uppsala, Sweden) is a Swedish professor of particle physics at Uppsala University.

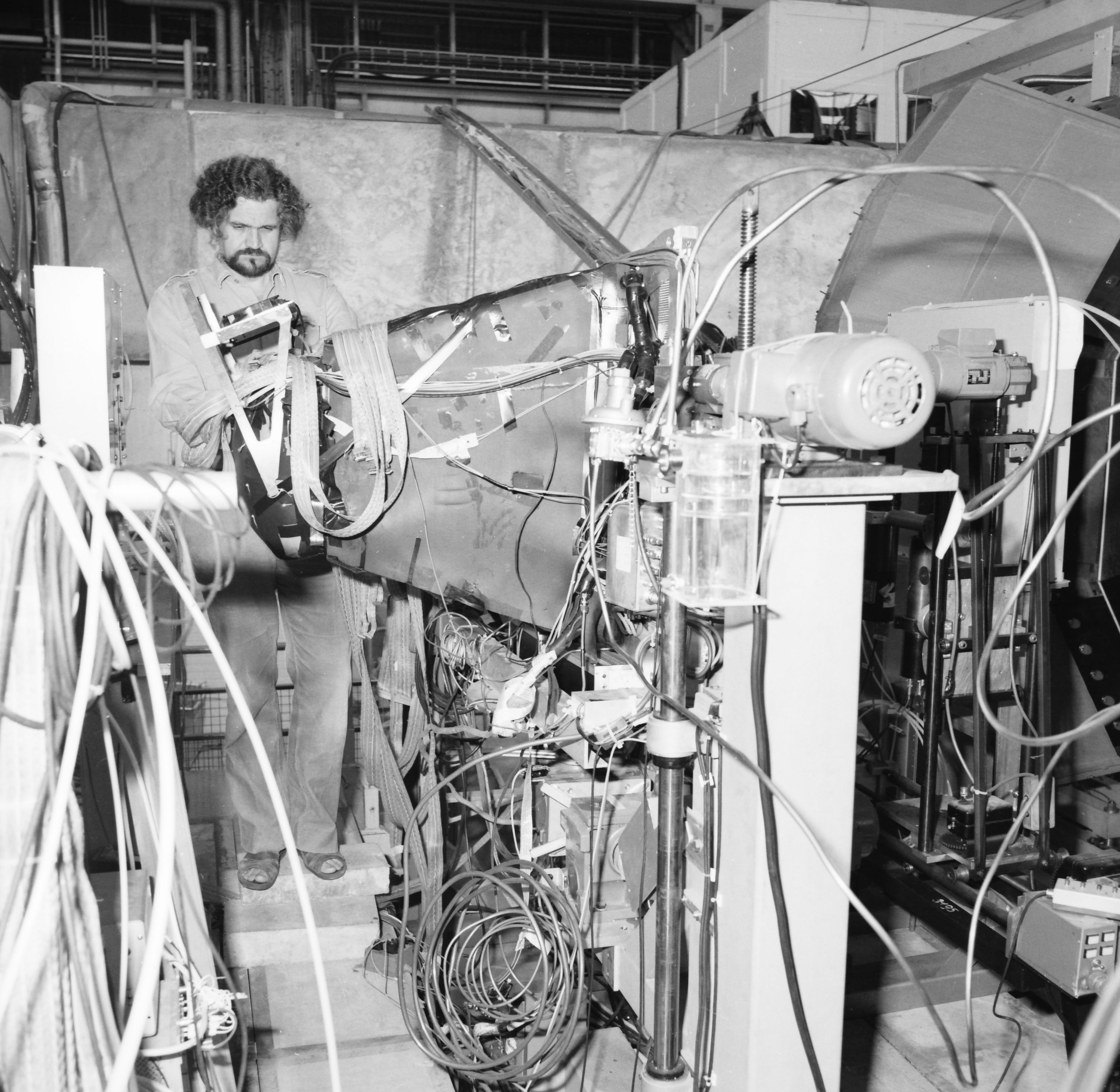
Tord Ekelöf working at the UA2 experiment at CERN, 1985.

== Biography ==
Ekelöf is the son of Per Olof Ekelöf and Marianne (Hesser) Ekelöf. He graduated in 1964 from the Cathedral School in Uppsala. Ekelöf became a bachelor of philosophy in 1966, a master's engineer in 1968 and obtained his PhD in 1972, all at Uppsala University.

Having obtained his PhD, under the supervision of Sven Kullander, Ekelöf spent several years at the European Organization for Nuclear Research (CERN) in Geneva; first as research fellow from 1972 to 1975, then as a research associate from 1977 to 1979 and finally as a staff physicist from 1979 to 1983.

In the years 1983 to 1988, Ekelöf moved on to a position as researcher financed by the Swedish Research Council before he again became affiliated to CERN as a research associate from 1988 to 1990.

In 1990 he became a senior lecturer at Uppsala University and eventually full professor in 1998.

Throughout his career, Ekelöf has been active in experiments at the particle physics laboratory CERN in Geneva, Switzerland. He has participated in many different collaborations, including ATLAS and DELPHI, and authored a large number of scientific articles.

Ekelöf has contributed towards the establishment of the Synchrotron-Light for Experimental Science and Applications in the Middle East.

In 2009, he was awarded the Björkénska Prize, a prestigious scientific award from Uppsala University.
