= Lore Zech =

German geneticist and cytogenetics researcher

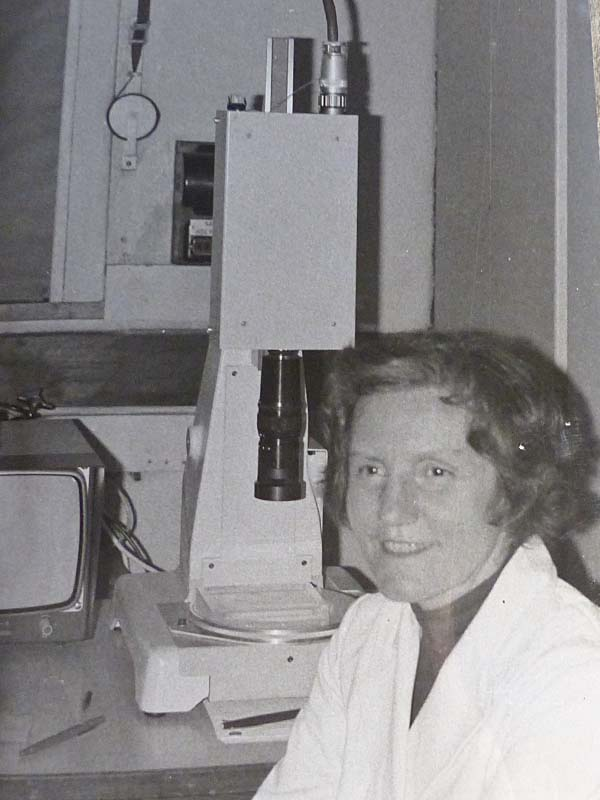
- Born: 24 September 1923; Gütersloh, Germany
- Died: 13 March 2013 (aged 89)
- Education: University of Marburg, University of Bonn, Max Planck Institute in Tübingen, Sweden
- Known for: human chromosomes
- Awards: Mauro Baschirotto Award of the European Society of Human Genetics
- Scientific career
- Institutions: Karolinska Institute, Stockholm, Sweden; University Hospital, Uppsala

Lore Zech (24 September 1923 – 13 March 2013) was a German geneticist and cytogenetics researcher who made major contributions to the field of cytogenetics. Her research and discoveries paved the way for the identification of anomalies in chromosomes of diseased cells and eventually for many treatments and therapies for these diseases. Her notable works include her discovery of Q-banding and her research on leukemia and lymphoma.

== Biography ==
Zech was born in 1923 in Gütersloh, Germany. Her grandmother raised her in Sauerland as Zech's parents died when she was 4 years old. From 1944 till after World War II, Zech studied medicine at the University of Marburg in Germany. Having left the medical field of study, Lore then picked up biology, chemistry, and physics at the University of Bonn and completed her doctoral thesis at the Max Planck Institute in Tübingen. From 1953 till 1989, she worked at the Institute of Cell Research and Genetics at the Karolinska Institute in Stockholm, Sweden where most of her notable work was conducted alongside Torbjörn Caspersson. She then dedicated her time at the University Hospital of Uppsala. At the University Hospital, she specifically committed her time to discussions on chromosome analysis at the Department of Medical Genetics, where she taught many research students. During her time as a researcher, Zech's colleagues described her as humorous and empathetic. Many established scientists and young researchers sought her advice and input on their own projects. In March 2013, Zech died from chronic lymphocytic leukemia, a disease she had conducted research on for many years.

== Career ==
Zech's most prominent work was centered on human chromosomes. She conducted her research on human chromosomes alongside professor Torbjörn Caspersson at the Karolinska Institute. Her research alongside Torbjörn allowed her to create the first chromosome banding technique known as the quinacrine or Q-banding technique. This chromosome banding method proved to be one of the most important advancements to clinical cytogenetics.

At the research institute, it was proven that DNA-binding fluorescent dyes could be used as a chromosome banding technique for plant chromosomes. Unlike many of her colleagues, Zech firmly believed that human chromosomes, similar to plant chromosomes, had different bands. Due to the department's beliefs against this idea, Zech worked on proving her theory correct in secret. She discovered that staining chromosomes with quinacrine makes the bands on the chromosome exhibit fluorescence when exposed to ultraviolet light. This chromosome banding technique eventually became known as the Q-banding technique. With this technique, she discovered the first chromosome band in the Y-chromosome of a human cell.

After her discovery and the acceptance of the Q-banding technique by other scientists and medical professionals, Zech used the technique to find chromosome abnormalities in two types of blood cancer – leukemia and lymphoma. In collaboration with tumor biologist Georg Klein, Zech helped identify the chromosome abnormalities in tumor cells. This allowed for the future development of a targeted therapy for leukemia and lymphoma.

== Awards and honors ==
- In 1971, Zech presented her findings on the Q-binding technique at the 4th Congress of Human Genetics in Paris.
- In 1992, Zech was awarded the Mauro Baschirotto Award by the European Society of Human Genetics.
- In 1999, Zech became an honorary member of the European Society of Human Genetics.
