= Pietà (book) =

1989 book by George Klein

- Author: George Klein
- Translator: Theodore and Ingrid Friedmann (English translators)
- Cover artist: Jean Wilcox
- Language: Swedish
- Subject: Philosophy, poetry, biography
- Genre: Essays
- Publisher: Albert Bonniers Förlag AB, Stockholm
- Publication date: 1989
- Publication place: Sweden
- English publication date: MIT Press, 1992
- Pages: 297 (MIT Press paperback)
- ISBN: 0-262-11161-6
- Preceded by: The Atheist and the Holy City
- Followed by: Live Now

Pietà is a collection of essays by the Hungarian-Swedish biologist George Klein first published in Sweden in 1989. It includes nine essays by Klein, several touching broadly on the theme of whether life is worth living. The introduction opens with a quote from Albert Camus in The Myth of Sisyphus (1942): "There is but one truly philosophical problem, and that is suicide. Judging whether life is or is not worth living amounts to answering the fundamental question of philosophy."

After the introduction, the first essay, "Pista," is about the suicide of a cousin and childhood friend in Hungary. It is followed by essays on the poet Attila József; the power of poetry and literature, with discussions on Rainer Maria Rilke, Friedrich Nietzsche, Thomas Mann, and Edgar Allan Poe; the role of German scientists during the Holocaust; an interview with Rudolf Vrba (the Auschwitz escapee); essays on AIDS and biological individuality; and reflections on Klein's own experience of the Holocaust in Budapest.
