= John Runnström =

Johan Axel Mauritz "John" Runnström (17 June 1888 – 20 January 1971) was a Swedish zoologist and cell biologist. He helped establish developmental biology research in Sweden. Along with his student Sven Hörstadius, and with studies on sea urchins, they developed the (double) gradient theory on how embryonic development and cell fates are decided along an axis. He was also involved in eugenics and co-authored a book in 1921 with Herman Lundborg, 1868–1943, on the superiority of the Swedish people.

== Life and work ==
Runnström was born in Katarina Parish where his father Mauritz Leonard was a baker married to Augusta Wilhelmina Björklund. He grew up in Söder and studied in Stockholm. He became interested in natural history and began to use a microscope at an early age. He also trained as a baker and enrolled in the natural sciences at Stockholm. He also began to read extensively and became interested in the work of Jacques Loeb. He received an offer to study at the Kristineberg Marine Biological Station where he met Gustaf Retzius. He received a scholarship to study at the Institut océanographique de Monaco where he worked as an assistant. In 1914 he wrote his thesis on the histology of the sea urchin. He worked as an assistant at the Bergen Museum's marine biology station where his brother Sven received some training. In 1916 he became a docent at Stockholm. In 1921 he visited the Stazione zoologica in Naples where he began to visit each year. He also began to collaborate with Sven Hörstadius. He conducted physiology courses at Stockholm and in 1926 he became interested in metabolism research after listening to Otto Warburg at the Physiology Congress. He received Warburg's apparatus. He also began to work at the marine biology research station at Roscoff from 1930. In 1931 he received an offer from the Rockefeller Foundation to upgrade his laboratory and a scholarship to work with Leonor Michaelis at New York. A new Swedish institute was built with part donations from Axel Wenner-Gren in 1936. The institute named as the Wenner-Grens Institute for Experimental Biology was inaugurated in 1939 and Runnström headed it until his death. He had offered to organize the International Cell Biology Congress in 1940 but due to World War II, he was able to do this only in 1947. Along with Torbjörn Caspersson he founded the Journal of Experimental Cell Research.

Runnström married school teacher Astri Wintzell (1897-1978) in 1917. She became a research assistant and wrote a biography of her husband.

=== The double gradient theory ===
Experimental studies on the fertilization of sea urchin eggs began early. The eggs were transparent allowing the study of cell division and reorganization in the early stages. Boveri suggested in 1901 that the vegetative point determined the fates of cells at other positions. In 1910 Boveri introduced the term "gefalle" or gradient into embryology and suggested that a single gradient emanated from the vegetal pole. In the 1920s Runnström and Hörstadius suggested that there were two centres from which gradients of animalizing and vegetalizing substances that controlled morphogenesis diffused. They found that substances like zinc and lithium could disrupt the balance of these substances.

=== Eugenics ===
In 1921 Runnström wrote a book along with Lundborg on the Swedish people which was commissioned by the Swedish Society for Race-hygiene. Runnström was a member of the Nobel Prize committee in 1932 and was involved in examining the recommendations for the Nobel prize for H. J. Muller and had suggested that both T. H. Morgan and Muller share the prize.
