= Greta Hammarsten =

Swedish clinical chemist and doctor (1896–1964)

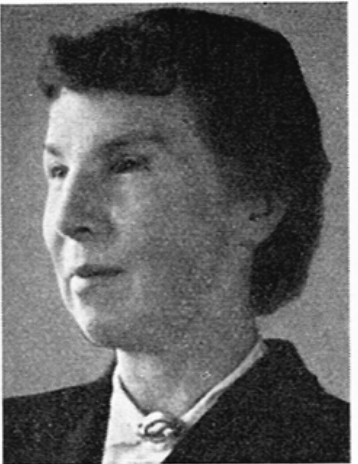
Greta Hammarsten

Greta Hammarsten (née Norrbin) (March 22, 1896 – July 17, 1964) was a Swedish medical doctor and a pioneer of clinical chemistry in Scandinavia.

== Education and career ==
Hammarsten was born in the Maria Magdalena parish in Stockholm. She left grammar school early and worked for Skandia from 1914 till 1918. From 1919, she started working as an assistant at the Karolinska Institute, where she stayed until 1927. During this time, she also studied microchemical analysis at the University of Graz in 1924 and chemistry at the Carlsberg Laboratory in Copenhagen from 1927 to 1928 and from 1930 to 1931, where she worked for S. P. L. Sørensen and Kaj Linderstrøm-Lang. She enrolled at Lund University in 1930 and became a medical licentiate and doctor of medicine in 1940. Her doctoral thesis was titled Eine experimentelle Studie über Calciumoxalat als Steinbildner in den Harnwegen : speziell mit Rücksicht auf die Bedeutung des Magnesiums, in which she examined the formation of kidney stones from calcium oxalate in the urinary tract, also known as renal lithiasis. She was an assistant at Lund University's medical-chemical department between 1930 and 1938. She worked at the medical clinic at Lund University between 1938 and 1939 and as an assistant physician at Hässleby sanatorium in 1940.

Hammarsten was an associate professor in medical and physiological chemistry at Lund University between 1940 and 1941, in clinical chemistry at the Karolinska Institute from 1946 onwards. Hammarsten moved to the Serafimerlasarettet in 1940 and to Södersjukhuset in Stockholm in 1945, where she served as the director of the central laboratory of clinical chemistry . In this role, she oversaw the expansion of the laboratory and made it a hub for scientific activity within the hospital. Her research interests extended beyond kidney stone diseases to include blood and liver diseases, as well as Rheumatoid arthritis. She was also known for her expertise in the field of blood diseases and conducted several experimental physiological studies in collaboration with Swedish and Danish colleagues.

== Research ==
Hammarsten published over 80 papers in physical and physiological chemistry and nutritional physiology. In 1947, Hammarsten published a voluminous guide to clinical chemistry analysis methods (Kliniska laborationsmetoder), which became a standard reference for laboratories in the Nordic countries. This work was updated and expanded in a second edition published in 1955, with contributions from other colleagues. In 1957, an appendix titled "Laboratory Tests" was added to the guide, including chapters on anticoagulation therapy, fluid balance, cystinuria, and B12 analysis.

== Personal life ==
Hammarsten married Swedish physician and pharmacist Einar Hammarsten in 1918; the marriage ended in 1928. She died in the Kungsholm parish in Stockholm. She was buried at the Northern Cemetery outside Stockholm.
