= Arne Bjerhammar =

Swedish geodesist

Arne Evert Bjerhammar
- Born: September 15, 1917; Båstad
- Died: February 6, 2011 (aged 93)
- Education: Royal Institute of Technology
- Awards: Gauss medal (1969), The Great Prize of KTH (1982), IAG's Levallois medal (1987), Rossby Prize of the Swedish Geophysical Society (1988), Nordstjärneorden
- Scientific career
- Fields: Geodesy, Mathematics

Arne Bjerhammar (September 15, 1917 – February 6, 2011) was a Swedish geodesist. He was professor at Royal Institute of Technology (KTH) in Stockholm. He was born in Båstad, Scania in the south of Sweden.

He developed a method used to determine the geoid in gravimetric data, as well as a system for electro-optical measuring of distances. He also did research about the Fennoscandian post-glacial rebound.

== Research ==
Bjerhammar's research covered many fields of geodesy. He built a prototype of a tachometer with his doctoral dissertation and improved the modulation system of the Swedish EDM instrument Geodimeter. Bjerhammer developed matrix algebra with generalized inverses for use in adjusting linear systems of equations, this work being published in 1955 and 1957. Seven years later, after studying M.S. Molodensky’s new approach to solving the basic problems of physical geodesy, Bjerhammer presented his original idea of analytical downward continuation of the gravity anomaly to an internal sphere (“the Bjerhammar sphere”). He proposed recovering the Earth’s gravity field by using the energy integral for satellites in 1967 and by the theory of general relativity using atomic clocks in 1975 and 1985. He studied the correlation between the gravity field and the Fennoscandian land uplift phenomenon (post-glacial rebound) in the 1970s. In total, he authored about 200 scientific articles and two textbooks, the majority of these articles being published as internal KTH reports. He chaired the International Association of Geodesy study group on Statistical Methods in Geodesy from 1963 to 1967.

His sabbatical leaves include staying as a visiting scientist at The Research Institute for Geodetic Sciences in Alexandria, US, in 1967 and 1968, at Stuttgart University (as an A-v-Humbold scholar) in 1982, National Geodetic Survey in Washington, D.C., in 1984 and at Ohio State University in 1985 and 1986.

=== Recognition ===
His research was followed by national and international recognition, confirmed by several prizes and rewards such as the German Gauss medal (1969), The Great Prize of KTH (1982), IAG’s Levallois medal (1987) and the Rossby Prize of the Swedish Geophysical Society (1988). He was awarded Nordstjärneorden by his Majesty the King of Sweden in 1971. In 1988 he became an honorary doctor of the Technical University of Graz.

== Bibliography ==
- A contribution to the methods of optical distance measuring, specially with regard to the problems of automatic plotting -1949
- Electro-optical distance measuring. – 1960
- Elementär geodesi. – 1964
- Felteori. – 1958
- A general formula for an unbiased estimate of the standard deviation of a triangulation network. – 1961
- A general method for an explicit determination of the shape of the earth from gravimetric data. – 1959
- A generalized matrix algebra. – 1958
- Geodesi – 1967
- Kompendium i instrumentlära. – 1961
- A method of combined centring and levelling for surveying instruments equipped with optical plumb indicators. – 1948
- A new theory of geodetic gravity. – 1964
- On an explicit solution of the gravimetric boundary value problem for an ellipsoidal surface of reference : final technical report – 1962
- On gravity. – 1968
- On the geodetic boundary value problem for a fixed boundary surface / by Arne Bjerhammar and Leif Svensson – 1983
- On the principal geometrical problems of geodesy. – 1961
- A stochastic approach to the mixed boundary value problem in physical geodesy. – 1983
- Theory of errors and generalized matrix inverses. – 1973
- Triangular matrices for adjustment of triangular networks. – 1956
- Communications from the Royal Institute of Technology, division: Geodesy, Stockholm 70 to the twelfth General assembly of the International union of geodesy and geophysics in Helsinki, July 1960 / by A. Bjerhammar & G. Almkvist – 1960
- Planering : [en antologi] / Arne Bjerhammar – 1970
