= Bengt Mannervik =

Swedish scientist (born 1943)

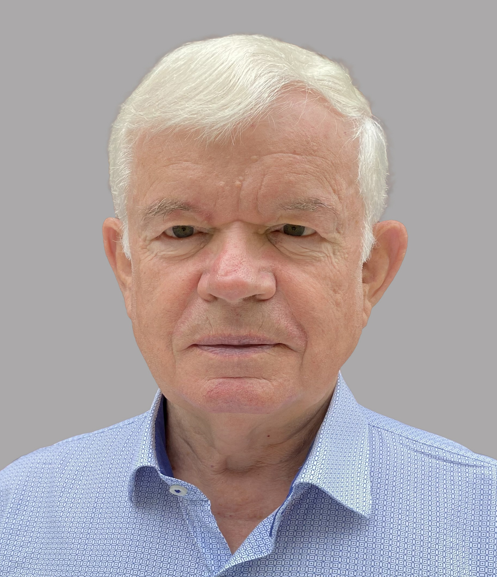
- Born: Bengt Eriksson; 19 August 1943 (age 82); Stockholm, Sweden
- Education: Norra Real, Stockholm, Stockholm University (Ph.D. 1969)
- Known for: Studies of enzymes involved in glutathione metabolism
- Awards: Björkén Prize (Uppsala University)
- Scientific career
- Fields: Biochemistry
- Institutions: Stockholm University, Uppsala University, Scripps Research Institute, La Jolla, California, and many visiting appointments

Bengt Mannervik (born 19 August 1943 in Stockholm), is a Swedish biochemist known especially for work on enzymes related to glutathione metabolism.

== Education ==
After secondary education under his birth name, Bengt Eriksson, at Norra Real in Stockholm, Bengt Mannervik studied at Stockholm University where he obtained his Licentiate of Philosophy in chemistry with a thesis on biochemistry in 1967. He obtained a Ph.D. there in 1969, and became a Docent (associate professor) at Stockholm University in 1970.

== Career ==
Bengt Mannervik was Senior Lecturer in the Department of Biochemistry at Stockholm University from 1970 to 1987, and was Acting Chairman for numerous periods between 1971 and 1988. In 1988 he moved to Uppsala University as holder of the Karin and Herbert Jacobsson endowed chair in biochemistry. He was Chairman of the Biochemistry Department from 1998 to 2000. From 2010 to 2012 he was a Senior Professor at Uppsala University, and was a member of the university senate from 2005 to 2008.

In 2010 he became Professor at Stockholm University. In addition he is an adjunct professor at the Scripps Research Institute in La Jolla, California, from 2013 to 2029.

=== Visiting professorships ===
He has had visiting professorships at UC Berkeley; University of Chieti, Italy; University of Perugia, Italy; the Scripps Research Institute, La Jolla, California; and the Collège de France, Paris

=== Professional services ===
He has fulfilled roles in numerous professional organizations, including the Swedish Biochemical Society (secretary 1976–1982); Chairman of the Swedish National Committee on Biochemistry, Royal Swedish Academy of Sciences, 1988–1990; Chairman Scientific Program Committee for the 22nd Meeting of the Federation of European Biochemical Societies, FEBS 1993; editorial boards of the Biochemical Journal, ChemBioChem, Biochimica et Biophysica Acta, Protein Engineering Design and Selection, the Journal of Biological Chemistry.

In addition, he has had advisory roles at various companies: Telik Inc.; PanVera Corporation, Pharmacia Biotech; Uniroyal Chemical Company; Biovitrum AB; Maxygen; Vividion; Oxford Biomedical Research, Rochester Hills, Michigan.

== Research ==
From the beginning of his career Bengt Mannervik studied enzymes of glutathione metabolism, including studies of levels in different tissues, structure and catalytic activity of glutathione transferase, a purification method, a detailed review on the isoenzymes of glutathione transferase, and many others. These publications have had a major influence on the field of glutathione biochemistry. Each of those mentioned above, together with three others, had been cited more than 1000 times by the end of 2024, the first more than 5000 times, leading to an h index of 89, as calculated by Google Scholar. In all he has had nearly 600 publications, with a combined total of more than 47000 citations.

His interest in glutathione transferases has continued after his retirement, for example studies of their role as efficient ketosteroid isomerases and as enzymes involved in the biosynthesis of moulting hormones in mosquitoes transmitting malaria and yellow fever.

In addition to the work directed specifically at enzymes involved in glutathione metabolism and detoxication, Mannervik coauthored texts on molecular toxicology.

He also studied various more general aspects of enzymology, including graphical analysis, error structure of kinetic experiments, weighting of observations, regression methods, directed enzyme evolution, and discrimination between models.

Major contributions were more recently directed to the evolution of novel functions by in vitro protein evolution.

=== Doctoral supervision ===
Mannervik has supervised more than 60 PhD students and among them Tamas Bartfai, U. Helena Danielson, Mikael Widersten, Per Jemth, Ylva Ivarsson, Vijayakumar Boggaram, M. Kalim Tahir, Usama Hegazy, and Abeer Shokeer have become university professors.

== Honours ==
Bengt Mannervik (born Eriksson) studied at the prestigious high school Norra Real in Stockholm and was given the prize for the best graduate in 1962. In 1988 he won the competition among 20 applicants for the internationally advertised Karin and Herbert Jacobsson Professorship of Biochemistry at Uppsala University, originally held by Nobel Prize Laureate Arne Tiselius. In 2013 he was awarded the Björkén Prize of Uppsala University. He was elected to the Academia Europaea in 2023. He was elected to the American Association for Cancer Research, and the Royal Society of Sciences at Uppsala. He is an Honorary Member of the American Society of Biochemistry and Molecular Biology. He was nominated Doctor Jubilaris at Stockholm University in 2022.
