= Sven Hörstadius =

Swedish embryologist

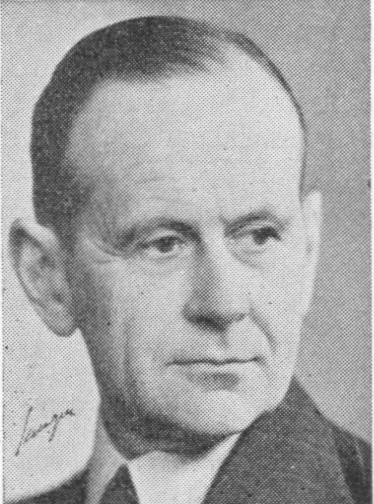
Sven Hörstadius SPA (cropped)

Sven Hörstadius ForMemRS (1898–1996) was a Swedish embryologist known for his work on sea urchin embryos.

He was responsible for an increased understanding of the neural crest.

Hörstadius studied under John Runnström at Stockholm University College and was awarded his Ph.D. in 1930. He was appointed professor of zoology at Uppsala University 1942, where he remained until his retirement in 1964, but continued to lecture as an emeritus. He was elected a member of the Royal Swedish Academy of Sciences in 1946 and of the Royal Society in 1952.
