= Telik =

Telik Inc
- Industry: Healthcare, Drug Manufacturers - Other
- Founded: 1988
- Headquarters: Palo Alto, California, United States
- Key people: Michael M. Wick M.D. ( Chairman, Chief Executive Officer, and President) Wendy K. Wee ( Principal Financial & Accounting Officer ) Gail L. Brown M.D. ( Chief Medical Officer ) (Dec 31, 2012)
- Number of employees: 17 (Dec 31, 2012)
- Website: telik.com

Telik, Inc. was set up in 1988 and was reverse merged into privately held MabVax in May 2014. The major drug of the company was TELINTRA, an investigational agent that was in development for the treatment of myelodysplastic syndrome (MDS) and idiopathic chronic neutropenia.

== Controversies ==
In 2007, a class action was filed against Telik, Inc., alleging that they made false and misleading statements about the Company’s business and prospects during the Class Period.
