= Stina Stenhagen =

Swedish biochemist (1916–1973)

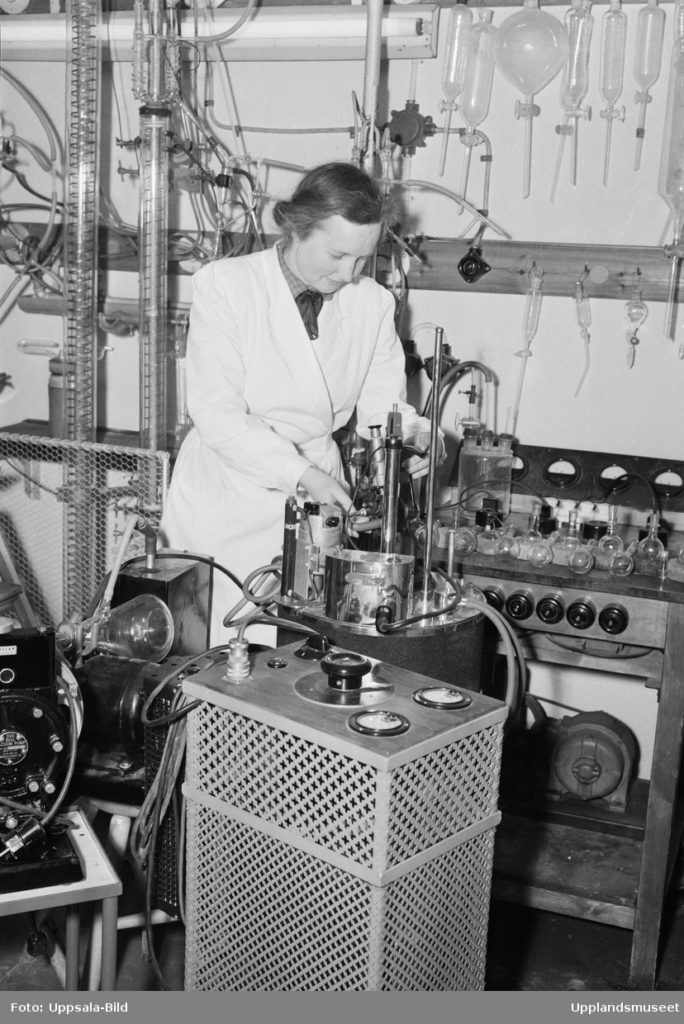
Stina Stenhagen in Uppsala (1951)

Stina Lisa Stenhagen (née Ställberg; 4 December 1916 – 26 March 1973) was a Swedish biochemist who was active in the fields of medical chemistry and chemical ecology. Together with her husband Einar Stenhagen she carried out groundbreaking research into the chemical composition of tubercular bacteria. In 1963, she was appointed professor of medical chemistry at University of Gothenburg, so becoming the institution's first female professor. She and her colleagues later applied gas chromatography and mass spectrometry to investigate how pheromones allow communications between insects as well as between insects and plants, developing interest in a field which became known as chemical ecology.

== Early life, education and family ==
Born in Norrköping on 4 December 1916, Stina Ställberg was the daughter of the school principal Johan Alfred Ställberg and his wife Anna Emilian née Swensson. After qualifying for her school leaving certificate in Norrköping in 1936, she was admitted to Uppsala University where she graduated in medicine in 1939. She was then employed as an assistant in the university's medical chemistry department where she met Einar Stenhagen whom she married in 1942. The couple had three children.

== Career ==
Together with her husband, Stina Stenhagen undertook research on the chemical composition of tubercular bacteria, initially concentrating of the chemical and physical properties of the fatty acids and their relationship to changes in the tissues. In particular, she published the results of her research in a thesis titled "Undersökning över optiskt aktiva former av högre fettsyror med förgrenade kolkedjor" (Investigation of optically active forms of higher fatty acids with branched carbon chains) for which she was promoted to the grade of docent in 1961. The same year, both she and her husband were awarded the Swedish Medical Society's Jubilee Prize for their work on the chemical composition of tubercular bacteria.

In 1952, Stina Stenhagen became assistant professor of medical chemistry at Gothenburg's Medicinska högskolan (medical college) where she continued her research and became an enthusiastic teacher. In 1960, she was granted an honorary doctorate and became professor of medical chemistry, so becoming the first female professor at University of Gothenburg. Her research turned to pheromones which are responsible for chemical communication signals between insects and plants. Together with the entomologist Bertil Kullenberg, she applied gas chromatography and mass spectrometry to her investigation of the structure of their active chemical compounds.

== Death ==
Stina Stenhagen died on 26 March 1973 in Mölndal.
