= Manne Siegbahn =

Swedish physicist (1886–1978)

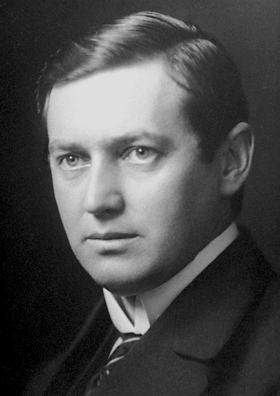
- Siegbahn in 1924
- Born: Karl Manne Georg Siegbahn; 3 December 1886; Örebro, Sweden
- Died: 24 September 1978 (aged 91); Stockholm, Sweden
- Education: Lund University (grad. 1911)
- Known for: Siegbahn notation; Molecular drag pump
- Spouse: Karin Högbom (m. 1914)
- Children: Bo; Kai
- Awards: Björkén Prize (1919, 1923); Nobel Prize in Physics (1924); Hughes Medal (1934); Rumford Medal (1940); Duddell Medal and Prize (1948)
- Scientific career
- Fields: Physics
- Workplaces: Lund University; Uppsala University; Royal Swedish Academy of Sciences
- Thesis: Magnetische feldmessung (1911)
- Doctoral advisor: Johannes Rydberg

Karl Manne Georg Siegbahn (Swedish: [ˈmanːɛ ˈsiːgbɑːn]; 3 December 1886 – 24 September 1978) was a Swedish physicist who received the Nobel Prize in Physics in 1924 "for his discoveries and research in the field of X-ray spectroscopy."

== Education and career ==
Karl Manne Georg Siegbahn was born on 3 December 1886 in Örebro, Sweden, the son of Nils Reinhold Georg Siegbahn, a station master, and Emma Sofia Mathilda Zetterberg.

Siegbahn graduated in Stockholm 1906 and began his studies at Lund University the same year. During his education he was secretarial assistant to Johannes Rydberg. In 1908, he studied at the University of Göttingen. He received his Ph.D. from Lund in 1911 with a thesis titled Magnetische feldmessung (Magnetic field measurements). He became acting professor for Rydberg when his (Rydberg's) health was failing, and succeeded him as full professor in 1920 following his death. In 1923, he left Lund to become Professor of Physics at Uppsala University.

In 1937, Siegbahn was appointed Research Professor of Experimental Physics at the Royal Swedish Academy of Sciences. In 1988, this was renamed the Manne Siegbahn Institute (MSI). The institute research groups have been reorganized since, but the name lives on in the Manne Siegbahn Laboratory hosted by Stockholm University.

== X-ray spectroscopy ==
Siegbahn began his studies of X-ray spectroscopy in 1914. Initially, he used the same type of spectrometer as Henry Moseley had done for finding the relationship between the frequency of characteristic X-rays some elements and their place at the periodic system. Shortly thereafter he developed improved experimental apparatus which allowed him to make very accurate measurements of the X-ray wavelengths produced by atoms of different elements. Also, he found that several of the spectral lines that Moseley had discovered consisted of more components. By studying these components and improving the spectrometer, Siegbahn got an almost complete understanding of the electron shell. He developed a convention for naming the different spectral lines that are characteristic to elements in X-ray spectroscopy, the Siegbahn notation. Siegbahn's precision measurements drove many developments in quantum theory and atomic physics.

== Family ==
Siegbahn married Karin Högbom in 1914. They had two children: Bo Siegbahn (1915–2008), a diplomat and politician, and Kai Siegbahn (1918–2007), a physicist who received the Nobel Prize in Physics in 1981 for his contribution to the development of X-ray photoelectron spectroscopy.

== Recognition ==
=== Awards ===
Year	Organization	Award	Citation	Ref.
1919	(Sweden) Uppsala University	Björkén Prize (Note: Awarded jointly with Carl Wilhelm Oseen.)	—	
1923	(Sweden) Uppsala University	Björkén Prize (Note: Awarded jointly with Theodor Svedberg.)	—	
1924	(Sweden) Royal Swedish Academy of Sciences	Nobel Prize in Physics	"For his discoveries and research in the field of X-ray spectroscopy."	
1934	(United Kingdom) Royal Society	Hughes Medal	"For his work as a physicist and technician on long-wave X-rays."	
1940	(United Kingdom) Royal Society	Rumford Medal	"For his poioneer [sic] work in high precision X-ray spectroscopy and its applications."	
1948	(United Kingdom) Institute of Physics	Duddell Medal and Prize	—	

=== Memberships ===
Year	Organization	Type	Ref.
1954	(United Kingdom) Royal Society	Foreign Member	

== Works ==
- The Spectroscopy of X-Rays (1925)
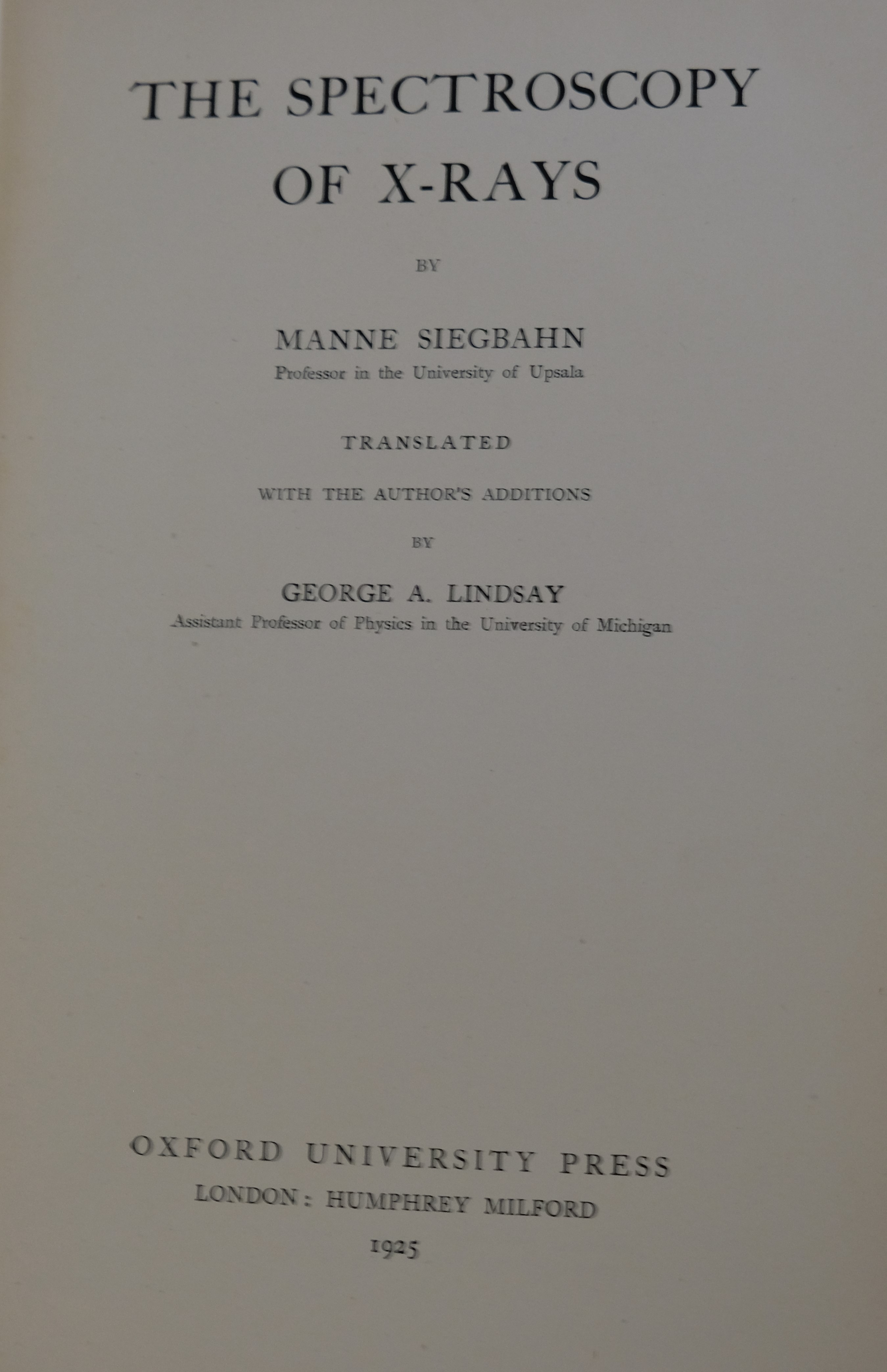
Title page to The Spectroscopy of X-Rays (1925)

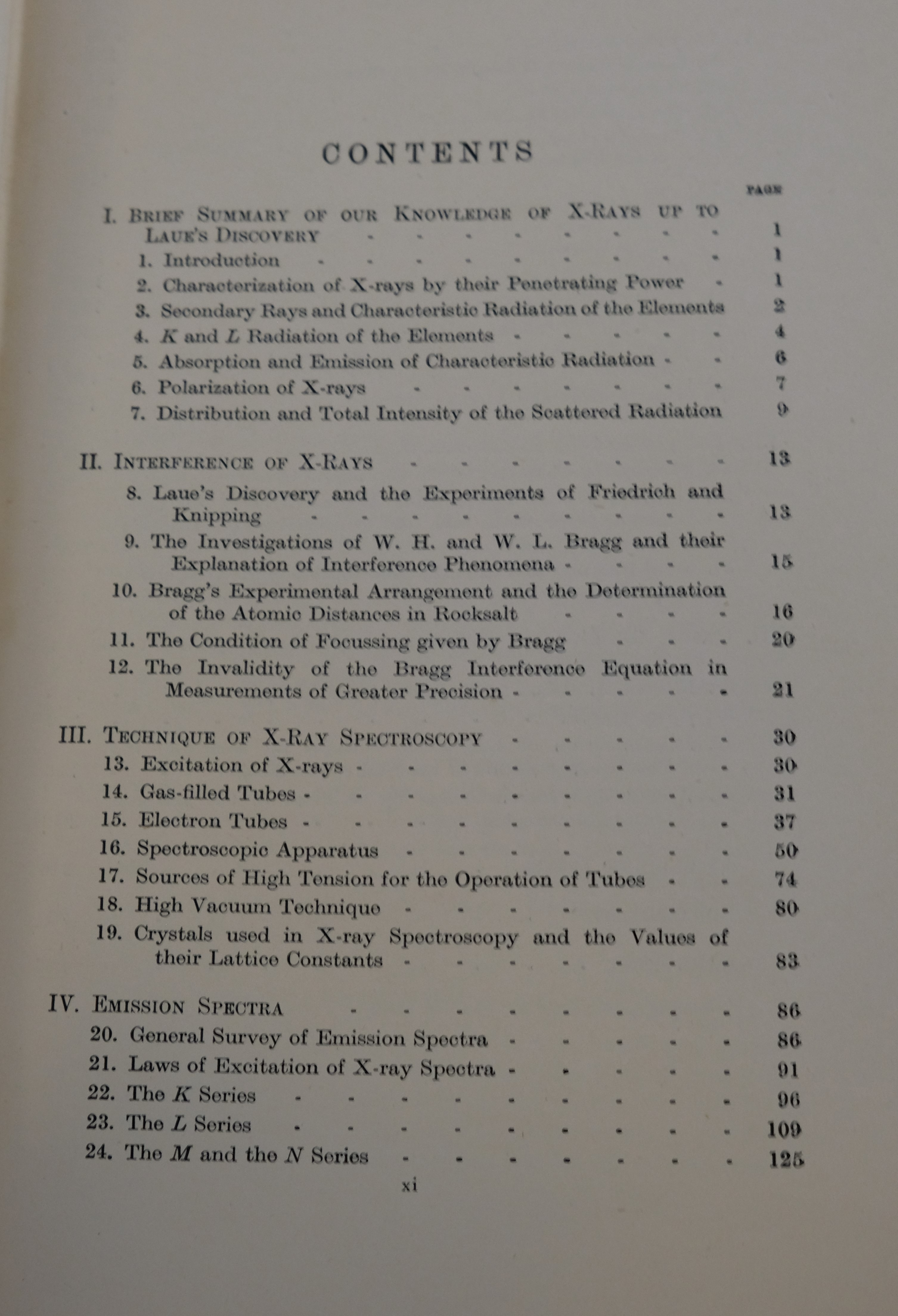
Table of contents to The Spectroscopy of X-Rays (1925)

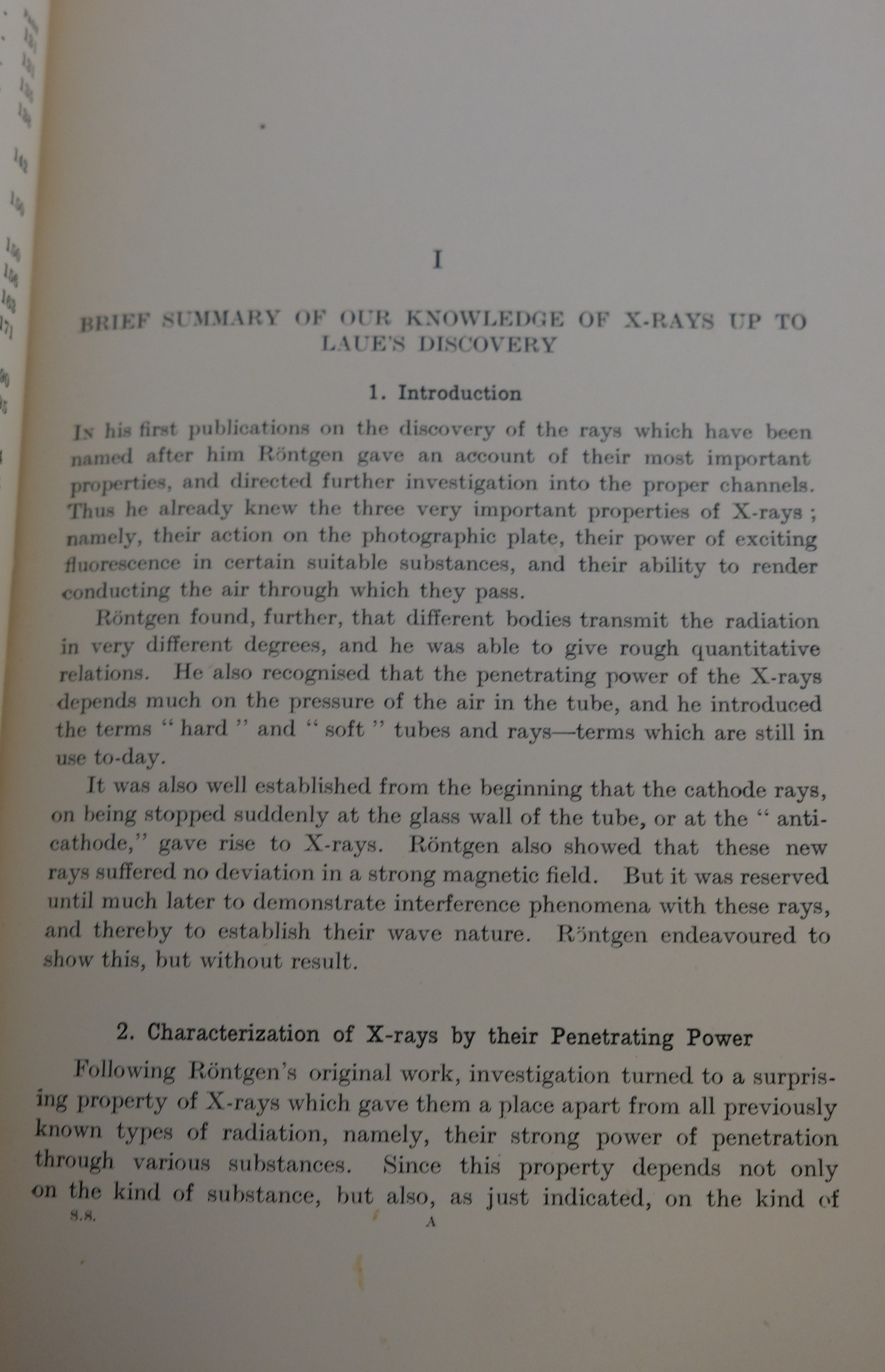
First page of The Spectroscopy of X-Rays (1925)

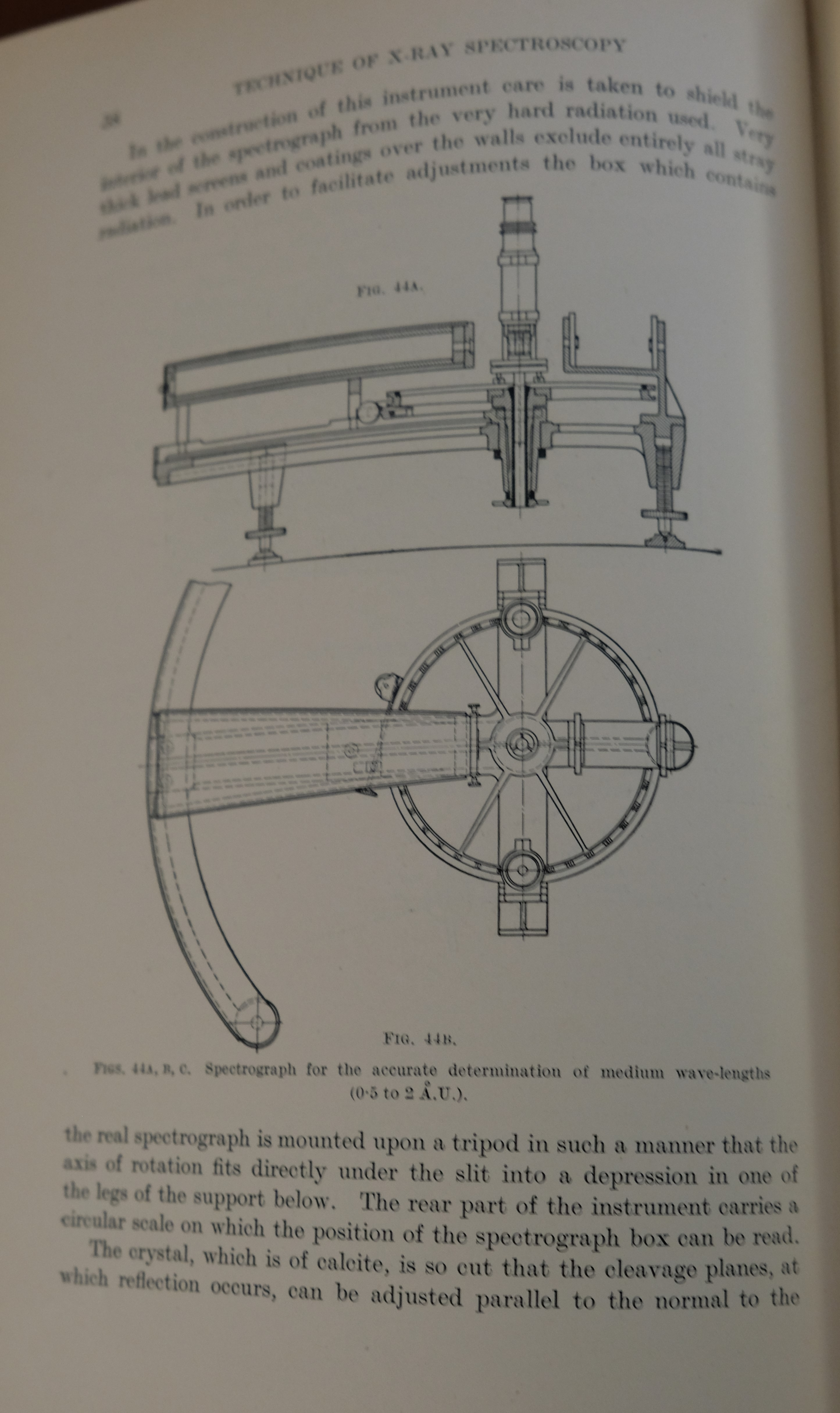
Figure from The Spectroscopy of X-Rays (1925)
