= Orvar Löfgren =

Swedish professor emeritus of ethnology at Lund University in Sweden

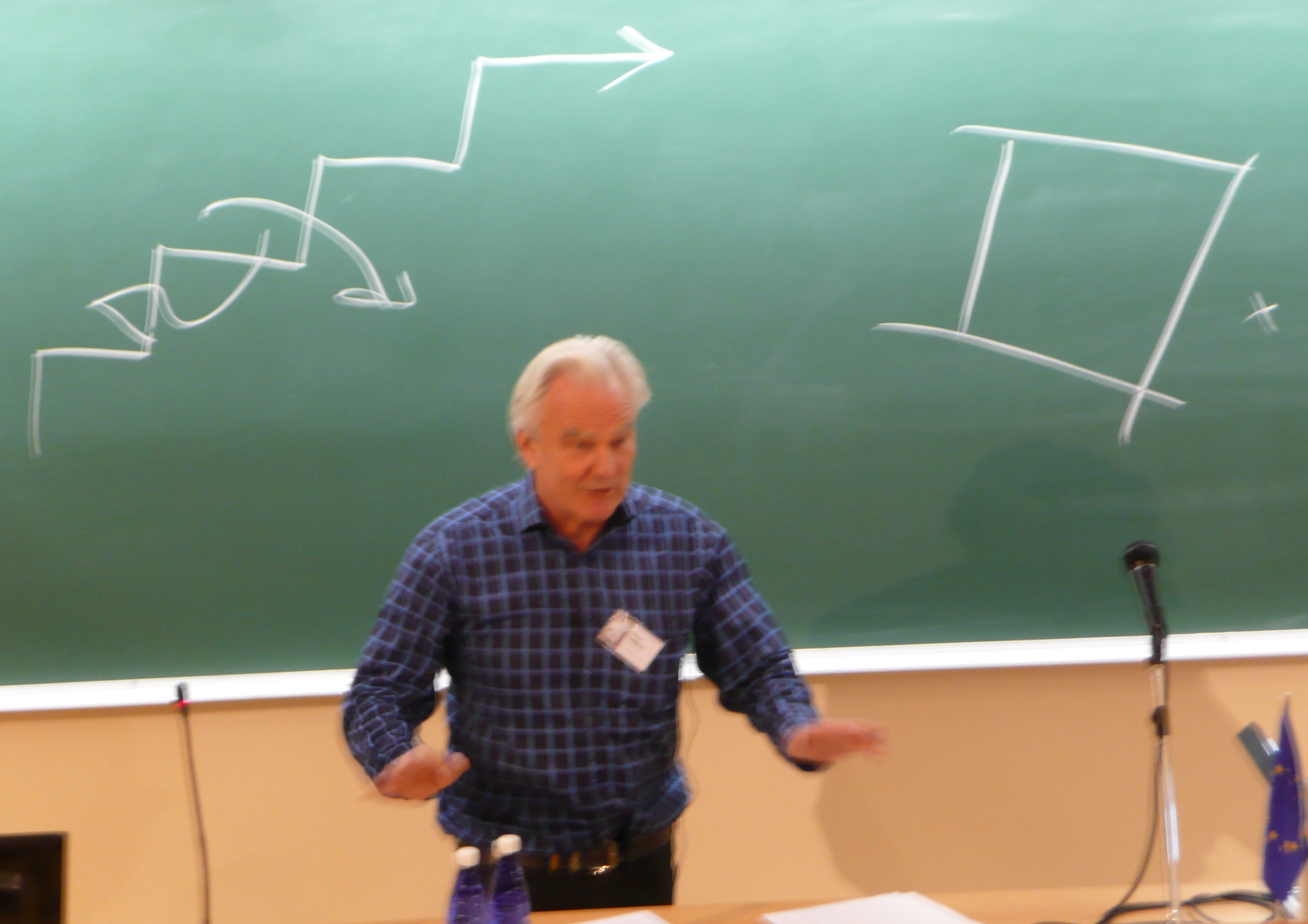
Orvar Löfgren

Orvar Löfgren (born 1943) is a Swedish professor emeritus of ethnology at Lund University in Sweden. Löfgren received his PhD in European ethnology in 1978 for his dissertation, Maritime hunters in industrial society: the transformation of a Swedish fishing community 1800–1970. He was Professor of European Ethnology at Lund University from 1991 to 2008, and a visiting professor at University of California, Santa Cruz, in 1983, 1986 and 1997.

Among his contributions to ethnological research, Löfgren has been innovative in his broad views of source material. He has studied the everyday conditions of consumption, leisure, travel, tourism, adventure tourism, and cross-border transnational activities such as in the Øresund Region in connection with the Øresund Bridge. He has also published on issues relating to the development of national identity in Sweden. He is the author of ten books and dozens of articles in academic journals.

Löfgren was awarded an honorary doctorate at the University of Copenhagen in 2008, and received the Gösta Berg medal the same year. He is a member of the Royal Academy of Letters and, since 1995, has been a foreign member of the Finnish Society of Sciences and Letters.

== Bibliography ==
- Exploring Everyday Life: Strategies for Ethnography and Cultural Analysis (2015)
- Coping With Excess: How Organizations, Communities and Individuals Manage Overflows (2014), with Barbara Czarniawska
- Managing Overflow in Affluent Societies (2012), with Barbara Czarniawska
- The Secret World of Doing Nothing (2010), with Billy Ehn
- Double Homes, Double Lives? (2007)
- Magic, Culture and the New Economy (2006), with Robert Willim
- Off the Edge: Experiments in Cultural Analysis (2006), with Richard Wilk
- Kulturanalyser (2001)
- On Holiday: A History of Vacationing (1999)
- Culture Builders: A Historical Anthropology of Middle-class Life (1987), with Jonas Frykman
- Myter om svensken (1984), with David Gaunt
