= Eva Klein =

Hungarian-Swedish biologist (1925–2025)

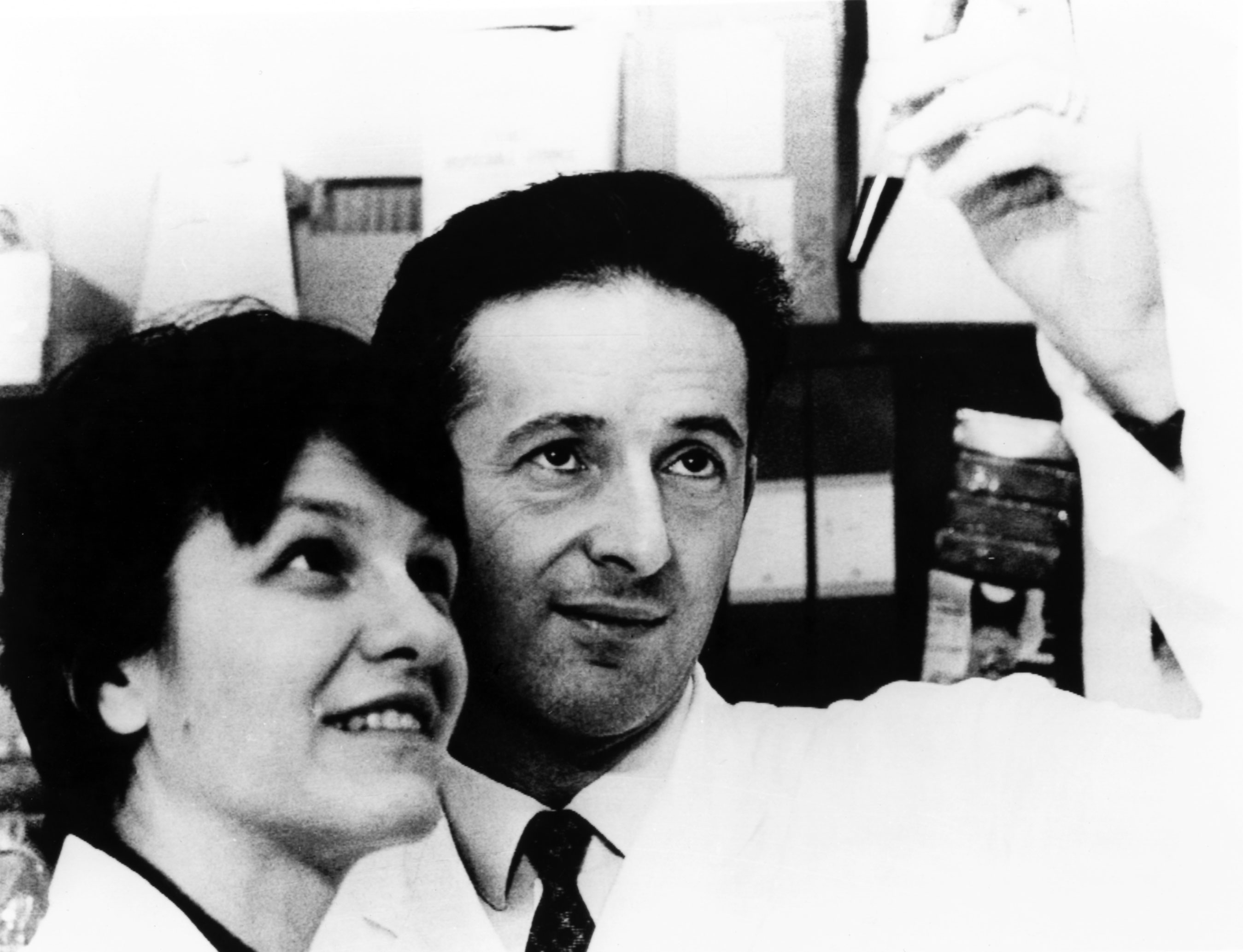
- Klein with her husband George in 1979
- Born: Eva Fischer; 22 January 1925; Budapest, Hungary
- Died: 19 January 2025 (aged 99)
- Education: University of Budapest; Karolinska Institute
- Known for: Discovery of natural killer cells; Establishing cell lines from Burkitt's lymphoma
- Spouse: George Klein (m. 1947; died 2016)
- Children: 3
- Awards: William B. Coley Award (1975); Fernström Prize (1983)
- Scientific career
- Fields: Tumor biology; Cancer immunology
- Workplaces: Karolinska Institute

Eva Klein (née Eva Fischer; 22 January 1925 – 19 January 2025) was a Hungarian-Swedish scientist. Klein worked at the Karolinska Institute since leaving Hungary in 1947. She is regarded as a founder of cancer immunology.

Her life and career choices as a young Jewish woman were constrained by discrimination, and she survived the late stages of German occupation in hiding. A medical doctor with a PhD in biology, she worked in cancer immunology and virology.

In the 1960s, she led the discovery of natural killer cells and developing Burkitt's lymphoma cell lines. She pursued her own lines of work as well as working closely with her husband, George Klein.

In 1975, the U.S. Cancer Research Institute established the William B. Coley Award for Distinguished Research in Basic and Tumor Immunology. The inaugural award was shared by 16 scientists considered to be "founders of cancer immunology", including Eva and George Klein. Their award noted their "discoveries of tumor-specific antigens in the mouse, to the most comprehensive immunological analysis of a human cancer, Burkitt's lymphoma".

== Early life and education ==
Eva Fischer was born on 22 January 1925 in Budapest, Hungary, to a well-to-do Jewish family. She attended private school, with an interest in sports, theater, and science (inspired by the life and work of Marie Curie). Her career choices were constrained by the political situation, with worsening anti-semitism and persecution when Hungary was occupied by Germany after she finished secondary school.

Fischer attended medical school at the University of Budapest, and in 1944–45 she and several members of her family survived by hiding at the Histology Institute of the University of Budapest. They were helped by János Szirmai, including forging documents. Szirmai was honored as one of the Righteous Among the Nations by Yad Vashem. Fischer broke from her medical studies to act in the theater, but returned to medicine.

Eva married another medical student George Klein, leaving Hungary to live in Sweden in 1947. She completed her medical degree at the Karolinska Institute in Stockholm, Sweden in 1955.

In addition, Klein was awarded honorary degrees from the University of Nebraska–Lincoln (in 1993) and the Ohio State University (in 2003).

== Career ==
Klein became an assistant professor at the Karolinska Institute in 1948, and achieved tenure in 1979. She established her own areas of research from 1948 encouraged by Torbjörn Caspersson from Karolinska's Department of Cell Research and Genetics, while also collaborating closely with her husband throughout her career.

Eva Klein published over 500 papers, and served as an editor of the journal, Seminars in Cancer Biology.

== Personal life and death ==
Both Klein and her husband George Klein worked as they studied for their medical degrees in Stockholm. They had three children: the eldest is a son who is a mathematician, followed by two daughters, one of whom is a medical doctor and the other a playwright. She defended her PhD thesis when she was eight months pregnant with her second child. Even with live-in help, managing her scientific career and raising three children was a struggle. She said that her husband was unsupportive of household and childrearing work.

Post-retirement, Klein continued to support students and pursued her research interests as emerita Professor with her own research Group. Another of her interests was translating Hungarian poetry into Swedish. She gave an interview to Swedish radio in November 2015, saying that continuing to work kept her young at 90.

The Kleins undertook wide-ranging pioneering work, jointly and separately, in cancer immunology and how cancer cells' malignant behavior can be suppressed by genes in normal cells.

Klein died on 19 January 2025, three days shy of her 100th birthday.

== Major achievements and honors ==
In the 1960s, Eva Klein developed cell lines from Burkitt's lymphoma that continue to be used.

In the 1970s, the Kleins' research groups were investigating whether there was an interaction between lymphocytes and antitumor response. Eva pursued an area she considered critical, while others did not. She jointly supervised three students (Rolf Kiessling, Hugh Pross and Mikael Jondal) with another Professor (Hans Wigzell), leading to the discovery of a unique type of lymphocyte (white cell) responsible for spontaneous cytotoxicity - the ability to "kill" tumor cells or cells infected with viruses. Klein named them "natural killer cells".

Klein had a longstanding interest in virology as well as immunology, studying the role of the Epstein–Barr virus in Burkitt's lymphoma.

Klein became a member of the Royal Swedish Academy of Sciences in 1987 and the Hungarian Academy of Sciences in 1993. In 2013, she was elected to fellowship of the American Association for Cancer Research Academy.

In 2005, the year of the Kleins' 80th birthdays, scientists at the Karolinska Institute established the Georg and Eva Klein Foundation, including a major donation from the Cancer Research Institute.

Klein was awarded the Karolinska's Silver Medal for Medical Research in 2010.
