= Nils Svedelius =

Swedish botanist (1873–1960)

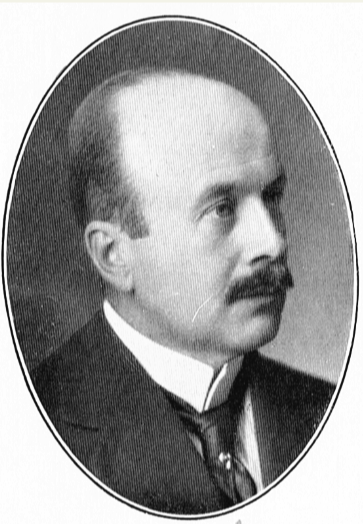
Nils Svedelius

Nils Eberhard Svedelius ForMemRS HFRSE (5 August 1873 – 2 August 1960) was a Swedish phycologist and professor of botany at Uppsala University. An expert on marine algae, Svedelius made contributions to the understanding of algal life cycles, particularly in red algae, and coined terminology like "diplobionts" and "haplobionts" in 1915. His extensive field work across the Baltic Sea, Sri Lanka, and Southeast Asia resulted in numerous publications that advanced phycology, including his influential 1942 memoir on the genus Galaxaura that advanced taxonomic understanding of calcified red algae.

== Biography ==
Svedelius was born in Stockholm on 5 August 1873 into a family whose name derived from the Sveden estate in Dalecarlia, where his forebears had farmed since the sixteenth century. He showed an early interest in natural history under a schoolmaster botanist and matriculated at Uppsala University in 1891, studying under Theodor Magnus Fries and Frans Reinhold Kjellman. He earned his Candidate of Philosophy in 1895 and, after extensive surveys of the Baltic algal flora along the coasts of Småland and Gotland, received his licentiate in March 1900. His 1901 doctoral thesis, Studier öfver Östersjöns hafsalgflora ("Studies in the marine algae of the Baltic Sea"), provided one of the first systematic treatments of Baltic marine algal communities—analysing altitudinal zonation, community composition and historical development—and led to his promotion to docent in October 1902.

In 1902–03, on a travelling scholarship, he conducted field work in Ceylon (present-day Sri Lanka), Singapore and Java. His Reports on the Marine Algae of Ceylon (1906) combined ecological surveys—linking algal periodicity to the monsoon cycle—with the description of 21 species of Caulerpa, two of them new to science. Adopting cytological techniques under Hans Oscar Juel's influence, Svedelius resolved longstanding debates on the development of the red algal genus Martensia, and in 1915 coined the terms "diplobionts" and "haplobionts" to distinguish patterns of alternation of generations among the Florideae.

Appointed Professor of Botany at Uppsala in 1914, he balanced teaching and administrative duties—including service as treasurer of the Royal Swedish Academy of Sciences (1932–1952) and of the Swedish Linnaeus Society (1924–48)—with pioneering research on biological life cycles, taxonomy and geographical distribution in green, brown and red algae. His monumental 1942 memoir on the calcified red genus Galaxaura re-evaluated Kjellman's seven-section system using anatomical and chromosomal evidence, demonstrating a diplobiontic life cycle—where distinct diploid (tetrasporophyte) and haploid (gametophyte) generations alternate—within a group previously thought to lack such alternation.

Appointed Professor of Botany at Uppsala in 1914, he balanced teaching and administrative duties—including service as treasurer of the Royal Swedish Academy of Sciences (1932–52) and of the Swedish Linnean Society (1924–48)—with pioneering research on life cycles, taxonomy and geographical distribution in green, brown and red algae. His monumental 1942 memoir on the calcified red genus Galaxaura re-evaluated Kjellman’s seven-section system using anatomical and chromosomal evidence, demonstrating a diplobiontic life cycle—where distinct diploid (tetrasporophyte) and haploid (gametophyte) generations alternate—within a group previously thought to lack such alternation.

Svedelius remained at Uppsala for his entire career. He retired in 1938 but continued research until failing health confined him at home; he died on 2 August 1960, three days before his eighty-seventh birthday.

== Honours ==
In 1944 he was elected a foreign member of the Royal Society. In 1955 he was elected an Honorary Fellow of the Royal Society of Edinburgh.

== Publications ==
- Carl Peter Thunberg (1743–1928) (1943)
