= Tamas Bartfai =

Hungarian neuroscientist (born 1948)

- Born: 8 July 1948 (age 78); Budapest
- Education: Stockholm University; Yale University; Hebrew University; Rockefeller University
- Occupation: Neuroscientist

Tamas Bartfai (born 5 July 1948), is a Hungarian neuroscientist with interests in neurotransmission, neuropeptides, prostaglandins, fever, and drug discovery. As of 2015, he is a professor in The Scripps Research Institute, and an adjunct professor at Stockholm University, the University of Oxford, and the University of Pennsylvania. As an author, he is widely held in libraries worldwide.

== Biography ==
Bartfai was born in Budapest, Hungary in 1948. He was a student of mathematics, physics, and chemistry before translating his skills into biochemistry, pharmacology and neuroscience. He earned his Ph.D. at Stockholm University with Bengt Mannervik, and studied post-doctorally at Yale University with future 2000 Nobel Laureate Paul Greengard, the Hebrew University with Shimon Gatt, and The Rockefeller University with 1972 Nobel Laureate Gerald M. Edelman among other professorships and visiting professorships. Bartfai has trained over 40 Ph.D. students and over 200 post-doctoral fellows and master's students. Many of his students are in leading positions in the pharmaceutical industry and 16 of them are full professors at universities.

He taught as a professor at Stockholm University, the Karolinska Institute, Yale University, Rockefeller University, University of California at Los Angeles, and Stanford University.

He succeeded to the Berzelius chair the Nobel Laureate Bengt I. Samuelsson at the Karolinska Institute, and Floyd E. Bloom at Scripps. Between these appointments he was Senior VP for Central Nervous System Research at Hoffmann-La Roche in Basel, Switzerland.

He is a member of the Academia Europaea, an elected fellow of the American Association for the Advancement of Science (AAAS), a member of Royal Swedish Academy of Sciences, and a member of the Hungarian Academy of Sciences.

In 2013, his accomplishments were celebrated with a rare symposium his honour at the Swedish Royal Academy of Sciences (Kungliga Vetenskapsakademien) entitled "Frontiers in Neurochemistry".

In 1966, he was awarded the Eötvös Medal and, in 1985, he was also then awarded the Svedberg Prize for biochemistry in 1985, Swedish Society for Biochemistry, Biophysics and Molecular Biology and the Swedish National Committee for Molecular Biosciences (Svenska nationalkommittén för molekylära biovetenskaper). In 1992, he was then awarded the Hilda & Alfred Eriksson Prize by The Royal Swedish Academy of Sciences and also the Ellison Medical Foundation Senior Scholar Award in 2002.

== Humanitarian efforts ==
From 1974 to 2002, he was an active member of various non-governmental organisations and effective apolitical entities: the International Committee of the Red Cross; chemical, biological warfare entities; formulation of [global] problems, threats and treaties entities; ethical committees for vaccine programmes; bacterial vaccine development and distribution efforts; and landmine issues and the technologies to eradicate the seemingly insurmountable complex international problems. He generally shuns publicity about his efforts for immediate patient treatment in the aftermaths of, for example, the Chernobyl disaster and the Fukushima Daiichi nuclear disaster. Bartfai is an expert on the detection, destruction and decontamination of chemical and biological weapons, and the immediate treatment of radiation exposure. He advises governments, the United Nations, and a number of non-governmental organisations. He has also driven development of a landmine detection system called "Hundnos" by the Swedish company Bofors, or "Bofors schnauzer". It works by sucking air, without sand, into a chamber with crystals coated with antibodies to trinitrotoluene (TNT). This so-called artificial bloodhound is both more efficient and cheaper than training dogs.

With Per Askelöf and Stefan B. Svenson, Bartfai created the first acellular pertussis (whooping cough) vaccine that is part of the current triple vaccine. Briefly, they cloned the pertussis toxin, mapped the antigenic epitopes using antibodies from individuals, who had the disease and or were vaccinated with the old whole-cell vaccine, and attached these antigenic peptides onto the diphtheria toxin as a carrier and adjuvant in one. This model is now used to produce other safe acellular vaccines. They also showed that 'toxoidation' of whole bacteria with formaldehyde — the method all manufacturers used to produce the highly neurotoxic pertussis vaccine — did not work on Bordetella pertussis because there are no free amino groups on the toxin of over 200 amino acids. This is both surprising and unlikely, but obviously can happen. Statistically, there should be at least ten lysines, but, there are none.

== Industrial activities ==
Bartfai has made the transition from academia to industry and back again. He is an inventor on multiple patents in the pharmaceutical and paper industries.

Bartfai has been involved as a consultant at almost all large pharmaceutical companies, including Astra, Roche, Novartis and Pfizer, and co-launched several biotech companies. As an executive or consultant he has consulted on, directed or co-directed the development of at least eight approved drugs. Five of these were "first-in-class" drugs: as a consultant to Astra, the first selective serotonin reuptake inhibitor for depression (zimelidine, and later alaproclate), the first proton-pump inhibitor (omeprazol/Losec-Prilosec – the most successful drug of all time) for 'heartburn', as a consultant to Roche, the catechol-O-methyltransferase inhibitor (Tasmar-tolcapone) used in Parkinson's disease, the first benzodiazepine–antagonist (flunitrazepam) for treatment of benzodiazepine overdoses, and as a consultant to Novartis the sphingosine 1-phosphate agonist gilenya-fingolimod as the first oral multiple sclerosis drug. He has also worked on four current drug candidates that as of 2015, are in phase 2 and 3 clinical trials. One of the most promising ones is the amyloid Αβ antibody that the Banner Alzheimer's Institute, Roche and the U.S. government are testing in Colombia for prevention of Alzheimer's disease.

Bartfai participated in developing the enzymatic, non-chlorine paper bleaching for BillerudKorsnäs and Tetra Pak. He has also consulted for Saab, Siemens, and Nestlé.

== Further research and some other major achievements ==
Bartfai has published over 400 peer-reviewed papers.

Bartfai has made a large impact on studying fever and its neuroscientific origins. For example, Bruno Conti and Bartfai used a grant from Larry Ellison of Oracle Corporation to create the "coolmouse". It broke the dogma that all mammals have a 36.7 °C core body temperature and only for short periods of fever or hypothermia in surgery can this be changed. They generated a transgenic mouse where the temperature set-point is manipulated during the entire life of the animal to 36.1 °C. This small but life-long hypothermia shows that the dogma is wrong and that these are healthy, fertile, normal-weight animals, who live about 25 percent longer than wild-type littermates. It was one of the last dogmas of physiology.

The discovery of muscarinic acetylcholine receptors in the brain (simultaneously with Sir Arnold Burgen and Solomon H. Snyder, 1973) earned Bartfai the Svedberg prize in 1985. Most Alzheimer's disease symptom-modifying drugs are still aimed at increasing muscarinic acetylcholine receptor stimulation in the cerebral cortex and hippocampus. Originally this receptor was not thought to be present in the brain, only in the periphery. Since Sir Henry Dale's time it was thought that muscarinic receptors were only present in the gut and since Otto Loewi that they are also in the heart, but the brain was not thought of as a site of expression. However, the cerebral cortex, the hippocampus, and the striatum are rich in the muscarinic acetylcholine receptors. They are receptors comprising seven transmembrane elements and come in five subtypes. Bartfai's group identified these receptors in search of the molecular mechanisms of memory. They were looking for the scopolamine-binding protein to understand how scopolamine, then a favourite of neuropsychologists, produces a reversible loss of memory.

Research on the coexistence of classical transmitters and neuropeptides, and frequency-dependent chemical coding led to Bartfai receiving the 1992 Eriksson prize shared with Håkan Persson, who discovered brain derived neurotrophic factor. Bartfai showed with Tomas Hökfelt, Marianne Schultzberg, and Jan M. Lundberg firstly that acetylcholine and vasoactive intestinal peptide can coexist in nerve terminals and act synergistically when released. Secondly, they showed that the neurotransmitters' release occurred at different nerve activity levels. For example, a neuron containing norepinephrine and neuropeptide Y will release first norepinephrine at 0.5–3 Hz and then neuropeptide Y at 3–20 Hz stimulation. Both neurotransmitters cause vasoconstriction, but the effects of norepinephrine are now widely prolonged by neuropeptide Y. Their work showed that the chemical palette of neurons were expanded qualitatively and frequency dependently.

Cytokines, such as interleukin-1 can be synthesized and released by neurons. Bartfai's group showed interleukin-1, then called the endogenous pyrogen, is released from the adrenal medulla and brain and demonstrated that the endogenous pyrogen can control body temperature by acting at receptors and hyperpolarizing hypothalamic gabaergic interneurons that control thermogenesis in brown adipose tissue, and thus core body temperature and the fever response.,

Bartfai has published two books with Graham Lees, Ph.D., on drug discovery and development: "Drug Discovery: from bedside to Wall Street" and "The Future of Drug Discovery: who decides which diseases to treat?", which are both also published in Japanese and Mandarin. He is a contributor of many books with colleagues in Stockholm and the USA on neuropeptides and on the coexistence of neurotransmitters.
