= Kai Siegbahn =

Swedish physicist (1918–2007)

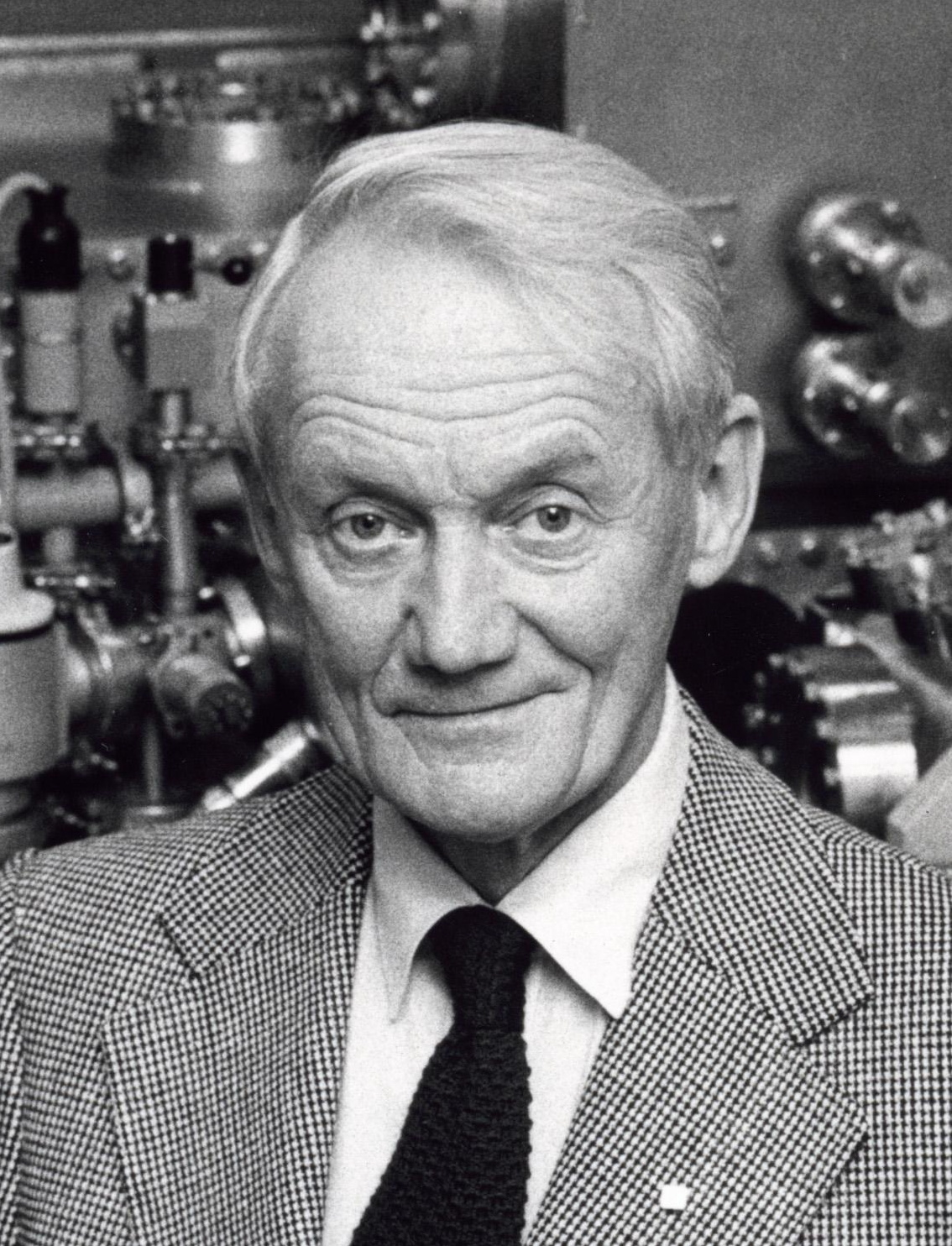
- Siegbahn in 1981
- Born: Kai Manne Börje Siegbahn; 20 April 1918; Lund, Sweden
- Died: 20 July 2007 (aged 89); Ängelholm, Sweden
- Education: Uppsala University (grad. 1942); Stockholm University (grad. 1944)
- Known for: X-ray photoelectron spectroscopy
- Spouse: Anna Brita Rhedin (m. 1944)
- Children: 3
- Father: Manne Siegbahn
- Awards: Björkén Prize (1955, 1977); Nobel Prize in Physics (1981)
- Scientific career
- Fields: Physics
- Workplaces: Royal Institute of Technology; Uppsala University

Kai Manne Börje Siegbahn (20 April 1918 – 20 July 2007) was a Swedish physicist who shared the 1981 Nobel Prize in Physics.

== Biography ==
Kai Manne Börje Siegbahn was born on 20 April 1918 in Lund, Sweden, the son of physicist Manne Siegbahn and Karin Högbom. From 1936 to 1942, Siegbahn studied physics, mathematics, and chemistry at Uppsala University. He received his Ph.D. in Physics from Stockholm University in 1944. Siegbahn was a professor at the Royal Institute of Technology in Stockholm from 1951 to 1954. He joined Uppsala University in 1954, where he remained until his retirement in 1984. He was also President of the International Union of Pure and Applied Physics from 1981 to 1984.

In 1981, Siegbahn was awarded the Nobel Prize in Physics jointly with Nicolaas Bloembergen and Arthur Schawlow. Siegbahn received half of the Prize "for his contribution to the development of high-resolution electron spectroscopy." He referred to his technique as Electron Spectroscopy for Chemical Analysis (ESCA); it is now usually known as X-ray photoelectron spectroscopy (XPS). In 1967, he published a book, ESCA; atomic, molecular and solid state structure studied by means of electron spectroscopy.

Siegbahn married Anna Brita Rhedin in 1944. The couple had three sons: Per (born 1945), Hans (born 1947), and Nils (born 1953).

Siegbahn died on 20 July 2007 at the age of 89. At the time of his death, he was still active as a scientist in the Ångström Laboratory at Uppsala University.

== Recognition ==
=== Awards ===
Year	Organization	Award	Citation	Ref.
1955	(Sweden) Uppsala University	Björkén Prize (Note: Shared with Hilding Köhler.)	—	
1977	(Sweden) Uppsala University	Björkén Prize	—	
1981	(Sweden) Royal Swedish Academy of Sciences	Nobel Prize in Physics (Note: Shared with Nicolaas Bloembergen and Arthur Schawlow.)	"For his contribution to the development of high-resolution electron spectroscopy."	

=== Honorary degrees ===
Year	University	Degree	Ref.
1972	(United Kingdom) Durham University	Doctor of Science	

=== Memberships ===
Year	Organization	Type	Ref.
1978	(United States) American Academy of Arts and Sciences	International Honorary Member	
1983	(United States) National Academy of Sciences	International Member	
1985	(Vatican City) Pontifical Academy of Sciences	Academician	
1989	Academia Europaea	Member	
