= Mats Hillert =

Swedish metallurgist (1924–2022)

Mats Hillert (28 November 1924 – 2 November 2022) was a Swedish metallurgist who was an emeritus professor in metallography (physical metallurgy) at the Royal Institute of Technology (KTH).

Hillert was born in Gothenburg on 28 November 1924. He graduated from Chalmers University of Technology in 1947 with a major in chemical engineering. After finishing his military service, he joined the Swedish Institute for Metals Research in 1948. He investigated his options for postgraduate studies related to his new area, and took additional physics courses at KTH. In 1953, he moved to the United States for postgraduate studies at the Massachusetts Institute of Technology, where he earned an Sc.D. in 1956, after which he returned to Sweden. He was made a professor at KTH in 1961.

Hillert made contributions to many areas of metals research, including thermodynamics and phase transitions.

In 1973, he was elected a member of the Royal Swedish Academy of Engineering Sciences, and in 1982, he was a member of the Royal Swedish Academy of Sciences. In 1979 he was awarded an honorary doctorate by the Chalmers University of Technology.

Hillert died on 2 November 2022, at the age of 97.
