= Torbjörn Caspersson =

Swedish biologist (1910–1997)

- Born: 15 October 1910; Motala, Sweden
- Died: 7 December 1997 (aged 87)
- Education: Karolinska Institute, Stockholm
- Known for: Nucleic acids
- Awards: Björkénska priset (1945); Paul Ehrlich and Ludwig Darmstaedter Prize (1977); Balzan Prize (1979); William Allan Award (1988)
- Scientific career
- Fields: Cell biology, Genetics
- Doctoral advisor: Einar Hammarsten

Torbjörn Oskar Caspersson (15 October 1910 – 7 December 1997) was a Swedish cytologist and geneticist. He was born in Motala and attended the Stockholm University, where he studied medicine and biophysics.

== Contributions ==
Caspersson made several key contributions to biology.

- He provided William Astbury with well prepared samples of DNA for Astbury's pioneering structural measurements.
- In 1936, in his doctoral thesis in chemistry, presented at the Karolinska Institute in Stockholm, he first studied genetic material inside a cell with an ultraviolet microscope to determine the nucleic acid content of cellular structures such as the nucleus and nucleolus using the Feulgen reaction to stain the DNA.
- He worked with Jack Schultz in Stockholm from 1937 to 1939 on protein synthesis in cells and published the work in 1939, where he independent of Jean Brachet, working out the same problem using a different technique, found that cells making proteins are rich in ribonucleic acids RNA, implying that RNA is required to make proteins. This was summarised in his book 'Cell Growth and Cell Function' (1950).
- He received a personal professorship from the Swedish state in 1944.
- He became head of the newly created department for cell research and genetics at the Medical Nobel Institute, at the Karolinska, in 1945.
- He was the first to study the giant chromosomes found in insect larvae.
- He studied the role of the nucleolus in protein synthesis.
- He examined the relationship between the quantity of heterochromatin (chromosomes with few genes) and the rate of growth of cancer cells.
- In 1969 when working at the Karolinska Institute, he (with Lore Zech) found that a stain (quinacrine mustard) caused chromosomes to show light and dark lateral bands along their length. This banding method permits the accurate identification of all 22 autosomes and the X and Y chromosomes. This technique highlighted slight structural abnormalities and specific identification of the extra chromosomes involved in conditions such as Down's syndrome (see also cytogenetics).

In 1977 he retired as head of the medical cell research and genetics department at the Karolinska Institute in Stockholm

In 1979 Caspersson was awarded the Balzan Prize for Biology "For his fundamental studies on protein metabolism and nucleic acids, culminating in a method for identifying specific bands on individual chromosomes by ultraviolet microscopy, thereby creating a new tool for the study of evolution" (motivation of the Balzan General Prize Committee). He was a member of both the American Academy of Arts and Sciences and the American Philosophical Society.
