= Emily Spörck =

Swedish physician

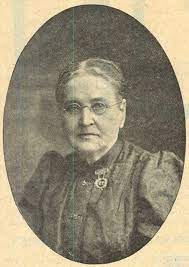
Emily Spörck (1901)

Anna Susanna Gunilla Emilia (Emily) Spörck née von Vegesack (27 March 1825, När—10 February 1904, Chicago) was a Swedish physician. At a time when women were not admitted to colleges of medicine in Sweden, she trained as a physiotherapist. After emigrating to the United States, she was able to study at the Habnemann Medical College in Chicago. When she graduated in March 1873, she became the second Swedish women to qualify as a doctor of medicine. Active in Chicago, she mainly treated women and children, especially Scandinavians. In addition, she lectured at the Chicago College of Midwifery and was active in organizations including the Woman's Christian Temperance Union.

== Early life ==
Born on 27 March 1825 in När on the island of Gotland, Anna Susanna Gunilla Emilia von Vegesack was the daughter of Baron Eberhard Ferdinand Emil von Vegesack, a captain in the national guard, and his wife Ulla Christina Sofia née Lythberg. She was the third of the family's nine children. From the age of eight she attended a private school in nearby Visby where she progressed in English, German and French. She became interested in medicine as she helped her father run his little chemists shop and diligently read one of his pharmaceutical books.

== Career ==
After the family moved to Visby, in the mid-1840s she met the Norwegian sea captain Peter Bruno Spörck when his ship docked in the harbour. They married in 1856 and moved to Bergen in Norway. Suffering from poor health, Emily Spörck was treated at the Hartelius Institute in Stockholm where after recovery she was trained as a physiotherapist. She returned to Bergen where she spent the next four years working as a physiotherapist.

Around that time, her husband retired as a seaman and began working as a merchant in Ålesund but his business failed and he decided to emigrate to the United States. Spörck left her job in Bergen soon afterwards and joined him in Chicago. Two years after her husband died in 1869, she began to study medicine at the Habnemann Medical College, graduating as a doctor in 1873 as the second Swedish woman to qualify as a physician.

On graduating, she specialized in the treatment of women and children, especially in connection with Scandinavian immigrants. In addition, she lectured at the Chicago School of Midwifery and was active in organizations including the Women's Christian Temperance Union.

Emily Spörck died in Chicago on 19 February 1904, aged 78.
