= Einar Hammarsten =

Swedish physician (1889–1968)

- Born: 4 January 1889; Norrköping, Sweden
- Died: 16 February 1968 (aged 79); Solna, Sweden
- Spouse: Greta Norrbin (m. 1918)
- Relatives: Tove Jansson (niece)
- Scientific career
- Institutions: Karolinska Institute (1928-1957)

Einar Hammarsten (4 January 1889 – 16 February 1968) was a Swedish physician and professor of pharmacy and chemistry at the Karolinska Institute from 1928 to 1957. His area of research was the chemistry of the cell nucleus, in particular nucleic acids.

== Career ==
Hammarsten was the first to discover that RNA, at that time called the tetranucleotide of yeast nucleic acid, is present in animal organs, or more specifically in the pancreas. Before Hammarsten's discovery, only guanylic acid had been found there. His doctoral dissertation in 1924 was concerned with purification of DNA, at the time called thymonucleic acid, its ionization and osmotic pressure.

Hammarsten was elected to the Royal Swedish Academy of Sciences in 1937. He was a member of the Nobel Committee for Physiology or Medicine, and was himself nominated for a Nobel Prize in Physiology or Medicine in 1941.

In 1918, Hammarsten married Greta Norrbin, a clinical chemist and medical doctor at the Karolinska Institute in Stockholm.

As the uncle of the future author and illustrator Tove Jansson, he is credited with inventing the name "Moomintroll", telling his niece that one of these little monsters lived in the pantry, in an attempt to stop her from pilfering food.
