= George Klein (biologist) =

Hungarian/swedish biologist

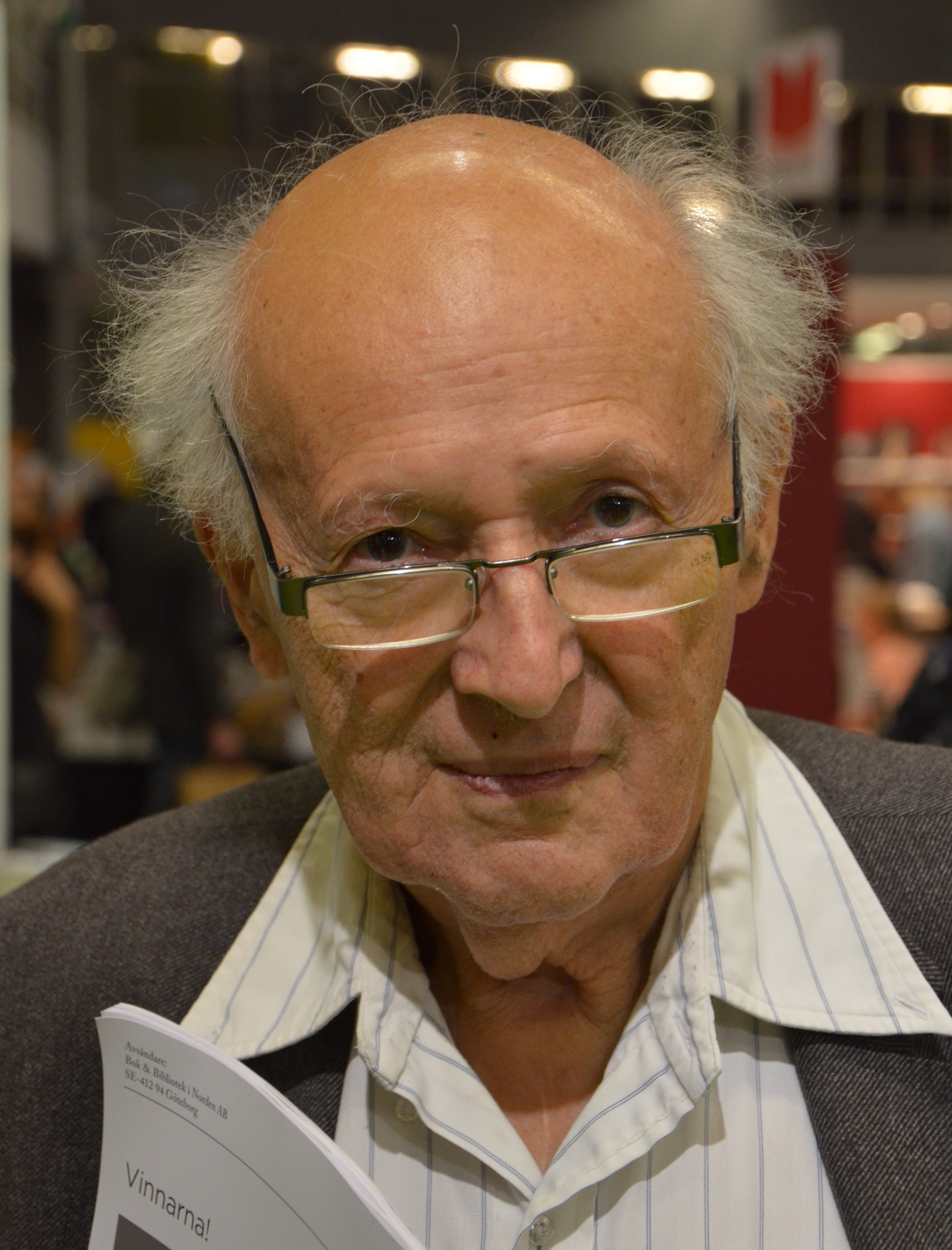
- Photographed in 2012
- Born: 28 July 1925; Budapest, Kingdom of Hungary
- Died: 10 December 2016 (aged 91); Stockholm, Sweden
- Other name: Klein György
- Education: M.D., Karolinska Institute, 1951; D.Sc., University of Chicago, 1966; M.D., University of Debrecen, 1988; Ph.D., Hebrew University, 1989; D.Sc., University of Nebraska–Lincoln, 1991; Ph.D., Tel Aviv University, 1994
- Occupations: Microbiologist, writer
- Employer(s): Karolinska Institute, Stockholm
- Known for: Cancer research
- Spouse: Eva Klein (m. 1947)
- Children: 3
- Awards: Leopold Griffuel Prize (1974); Harvey Prize (1975); Alfred P. Sloan Jr. Prize (1979); Dobloug Prize (1990), and many others

George Klein (Georg Klein; born Klein György, 28 July 1925 – 10 December 2016) was a Hungarian–Swedish microbiologist and public intellectual. Specializing in cancer research, he was professor of tumour biology at the Karolinska Institute in Stockholm from 1957 to 1992, a chair created for him, and as professor emeritus continued to work as research group leader in the microbiology and tumor biology center. According to Nature, the department Klein founded was "international and influential", from 1967 to 1993, Klein was member of the Nobel Assembly at the Karolinska Institute. In the 1960s he and his wife, Eva Klein, "laid the foundation for modern tumour immunology".

In addition to having over 1,385 papers published on cancer and experimental cell research, Klein authored over 13 books in Swedish on a wide range of topics, including essays on the Holocaust in Hungary. In 1944 he escaped from being loaded onto a train in Budapest during the deportation of Jews to the Auschwitz concentration camp.

Three of Klein's books have been translated into English: The Atheist and the Holy City (1990); Pietà (1992), a collection of essays on whether life is worth living; and Live Now (1997). He received numerous awards for his scientific work, including the Leopold Griffuel Prize in 1974, the Harvey Prize in 1975, and the Alfred P. Sloan Jr. Prize in 1979. In 1990 the Swedish Academy awarded him the Dobloug Prize for his contribution to literature.

== Early life ==
Klein was born Klein György to a Jewish family in Budapest, but as an orphan he was brought up by his grandparents in Mezőkaszony, a little village in the Carpathian Mountains of the Hungarian-speaking part, that time eastern part of Czechoslovakia, now of Ukraine. When he was five, the family moved to Budapest, Hungary, where he attended the Berzsenyi Gymnasium.

== Holocaust in Hungary ==
Klein wrote in Pietà and elsewhere about his experiences during the Holocaust as a teenager in Budapest, after the German invasion of Hungary in March 1944. Between May and July 1944, 437,000 Hungarian Jews were deported by cattle train to the Auschwitz concentration camp, to be "resettled", according to the Germans. Most were, in fact, sent to the gas chambers.

In May or June 1944, Klein was working as a junior secretary for the Jewish Council in Sip Street, Budapest, when he was shown a copy of the Vrba-Wetzler report by his boss, Dr. Zoltán Kohn. The report was an eyewitness account of what was happening in Auschwitz, including details about the gas chambers. The authors, Rudolf Vrba and Alfréd Wetzler, had escaped from the camp in April that year. They warned that most of the deportees arriving at the camp were being killed, not resettled.

Klein tried to warn his family and friends, but no one would listen. When the time came for him to board one of the trains, he ran instead, and ended up hiding in a cellar until January 1945. Decades later, he looked for Vrba, then a professor of pharmacology in Canada, to thank him, and subsequently wrote about him and his report in two essays: "The Ultimate Fear of the Traveler Returning from Hell" in Pietà (first published in Sweden in 1989), and "Confronting the Holocaust: An Eyewitness Account" (2011) in The Auschwitz Reports and the Holocaust in Hungary, edited by Randolph L. Braham and William vanden Heuvel.

== Move to Sweden ==
=== Karolinska Institute ===
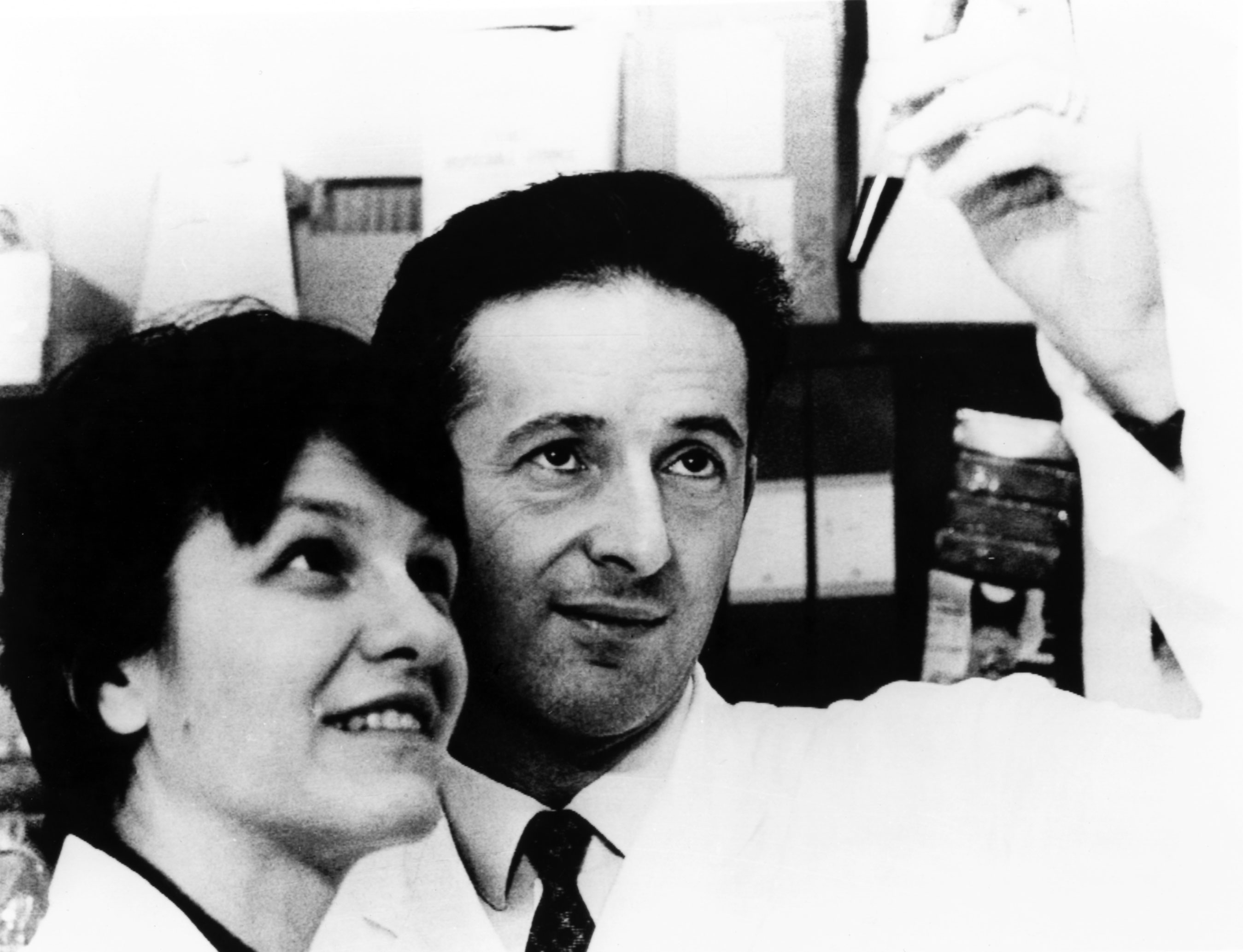
Eva and George Klein in 1979

When the war ended, Klein and a friend traveled to Szeged, a town 300 km from Budapest, to find out whether its university was still functioning. Budapest's university, then known as the Pázmány Péter University, was deserted. They walked part of the way and hitched rides, arriving in Szeged on 4 February 1945. The University of Szeged was still functioning, and Klein was admitted as a student. He studied medicine there for three months before continuing his studies in Budapest.

Klein worked as an instructor in histology and pathology from 1945 to 1947 at the Pázmány Péter University; it was while working there, in July 1947, that he met his future wife, Eva Fischer. Shortly after meeting her, he and a group of students were invited by a Jewish student club in Sweden to visit Stockholm and Gothenburg, where Klein was introduced to the Karolinska Institute. After talking to Torbjörn Caspersson, he was offered a job there as a research assistant. He returned to Budapest in September 1947 and married Eva, who joined him in Stockholm in March 1948, shortly before the Hungarian People's Republic came into existence.

Klein completed his M.D. at the Karolinska Institute in 1951 and held the position of assistant professor of cell research from 1951 to 1957. Eva Klein completed her M.D., also at the Karolinska Institute, in 1955. In 1957 Klein was promoted to professor of tumor biology, a chair created for him, and he and his wife created the Department of Tumour Biology, with a donation from a Swedish charity, Riksföreningen mot cancer. Klein led the department until 1993, after which he was its research group leader.

=== Cancer research ===
In 1960 the Kleins published an important paper in Cancer Research, "Demonstration of Resistance against Methylcholanthrene-induced Sarcomas in the Primary Autochthonous Host". The paper showed, as Pramod K. Srivastava wrote, "that tumors could elicit protective immunity against themselves in syngenic hosts, and that such immunity was specific to the individual tumor". According to Klein's obituary in Nature, researchers at the time believed that cancers carried "a common antigen that the immune system could recognize. The Kleins and their colleagues used a chemical carcinogen to induce tumors in mice, surgically removed these and immunized the animals with irradiated cells from their tumors. Next, the group inoculated mice with viable cancer cells and demonstrated that the immune system would only reject cancerous cells if they came from the original tumor. This clarified the field: the immune system could recognize and reject cancers, in a way that was specific to each individual."

Klein later made a connection between the Epstein-Barr virus and lymphomas and other cancers. He was responsible, with Henry Harris, for establishing the "phenomenon of tumour suppression ... using the technique of somatic cell hydridization".

== Personal life ==
George and Eva Klein had three children together: a son who is a mathematician, and two daughters, one of whom is a medical doctor and the other a playwright. The couple described the beginning of their careers and how they met, in an article they wrote together in 1989, "How One Thing has Led to Another". Klein died on 10 December 2016 at the age of 91.

== Awards and honors ==
Klein was the recipient of many awards and honorary doctorates for his research and literary contributions. In November 2003 Sveriges Television broadcast a documentary about him, Georg Klein, by Ulf von Strauss. He was a member of the American Academy of Arts and Sciences (1967), the United States National Academy of Sciences (1973), and the American Philosophical Society (1979). His awards included:

- (1974) Leopold Griffuel Prize
- (1975) Harvey Prize
- (1979) Alfred P. Sloan Jr. Prize
- (1990) Dobloug Prize
- (1996) Kaposi Award, 1996
- (1997) Chester Stock Award, Memorial Sloan Kettering Cancer Center
- (1998) Orden Nacional al Mérito de la República de Colombia
- (1998) Robert Koch gold medal
- (1998) Institute of Human Virology, Lifetime Achievement Award
- (1999) Prize of the Brupbacher Foundation, Zürich
- (2002) Ingemar Hedenius Prize
- (2010) Royal Award of the Swedish Academy
- (2015) Gerard Bonnier Prize

== Selected works ==
Klein published over 1,385 papers and 13 books, including:

=== Books ===
- Klein, George (2014) [1984]. I stället för hemland: memoarer ("In Place of a Homeland"). Stockholm: Albert Bonniers Förlag. ISBN 91-0-047466-5
- Klein, George (1992) [1987]. The Atheist and the Holy City: Encounters and Reflections. MIT Press. First published as Ateisten och den heliga staden: möten och tankar.
- Klein, George (1992) [1989]. Pietà. MIT Press.
- Klein, George (1990). Om kreativitet och flow. Stockholm: Brombergs. ISBN 9789176089521
- Klein, George and Gyllensten, Lars (1991). Hack i häl på Minerva. Stockholm: Albert Bonniers Förlag.
- Klein, George and Ahlmark, Per (1991). Motståndet: Arton brev om död och liv. Stockholm: Albert Bonniers Förlag.
- Klein, George (1995). Den sjunde djävulen. Stockholm: Albert Bonniers Förlag. ISBN 91-0-056021-9
- Klein, George (1997). Live Now: Inspiring Accounts of Overcoming Adversity. Prometheus Books. First published as Utvägen.
- Klein, George (1998). Korpens blick : essäer om vetenskap och moral. Stockholm: Albert Bonniers Förlag. ISBN 91-0-056644-6
- Klein, George (2001). Så jag kan svara döden, när den kommer : essäer. Stockholm: Albert Bonniers Förlag. ISBN 91-0-057494-5
- Klein, George (2001). Vak akarat es önozö dns. Budapest: Magvetö. ISBN 963-14-2216-X
- Klein, George (2006). Meteorer : tre lysande särlingar. Stockholm: Albert Bonniers Förlag. ISBN 978-91-0-012108-2
- Klein, George (2011). Jag återvänder aldrig. Essäer i Förintelsens skugga. Stockholm: Albert Bonniers Förlag. ISBN 978-91-0-012583-7
- Klein, George (2015). Resistens. Tankar om motstånd. Stockholm: Albert Bonniers Förlag. ISBN 978-91-0-015372-4

=== Papers, book chapters ===
- Klein, George (2011). "Confronting the Holocaust: An Eyewitness Account", in Randolph L. Braham and William vanden Heuvel (eds.). The Auschwitz Reports and the Holocaust in Hungary. New York: Columbia University Press, pp. 255–283.
- Klein, George (2008). "Reversion of tumorigenicity in an EBV-converted Burkitt's lymphoma line", in Gregory R. Bock and Joan Marsh (eds.). Genetic Analysis of Tumour Suppression. New York: John Wiley & Sons.
- Klein, George; Klein, Eva (16 May 1985). "Evolution of tumours and the impact of molecular oncology". Nature. 315, pp. 190–195. doi:10.1038/315190a0
- Zur Hausen, Harald; Schulte-Holthausen, Heinrich; Klein, George, et al. (12 December 1970). "Epstein–Barr virus in Burkitt's lymphoma and nasopharyngeal carcinoma: EBV DNA in biopsies of Burkitt tumours and anaplastic carcinomas of the nasopharynx". Nature. 228, pp. 1056–1058. doi:10.1038/2281056a0
- Sjögren, Hans Olof; Hellström; Ingegerd and Klein, George (April 1961). "Transplantation of Polyoma Virus-induced Tumors in Mice". Cancer Research. 21(3), pp. 329–337.
- Klein, George; Sjögren, Hans Olof; Klein, Eva and Hellström, Karl Erik (December 1960). "Demonstration of Resistance against Methylcholanthrene-induced Sarcomas in the Primary Autochthonous Host". Cancer Research. 20(11), pp. 1561–1572.
