= Sven Kullander (physicist) =

Swedish physicist

Sven Kullander (9 March 1936 – 28 January 2014) was a Swedish physicist. He was professor of High Energy Physics at Uppsala University. Kullander received his doctorate from Uppsala University in 1971. He took part in experiments on measurements of nuclear shell structure from meson scattering carried out in accelerators, on the structure of Helium nuclei, and on quark structure of matter by meson production. He also contributed to the development of accelerators.

Since 1990, Kullander had been a member of the Royal Swedish Academy of Sciences and since 2004, chairman of its Energy Committee.
