= 1862 =

1862 in various calendars
- Gregorian calendar: 1862; MDCCCLXII
- Ab urbe condita: 2615
- Armenian calendar: 1311; ԹՎ ՌՅԺԱ
- Assyrian calendar: 6612
- Baháʼí calendar: 18–19
- Balinese saka calendar: 1783–1784
- Bengali calendar: 1268–1269
- Berber calendar: 2812
- British Regnal year: 25 Vict. 1 – 26 Vict. 1
- Buddhist calendar: 2406
- Burmese calendar: 1224
- Byzantine calendar: 7370–7371
- Chinese calendar: 辛酉年 (Metal Rooster); 4559 or 4352 — to — 壬戌年 (Water Dog); 4560 or 4353
- Coptic calendar: 1578–1579
- Discordian calendar: 3028
- Ethiopian calendar: 1854–1855
- Hebrew calendar: 5622–5623
- Hindu calendars
- Vikram Samvat: 1918–1919
- Shaka Samvat: 1783–1784
- Kali Yuga: 4962–4963
- Holocene calendar: 11862
- Igbo calendar: 862–863
- Iranian calendar: 1240–1241
- Islamic calendar: 1278–1279
- Japanese calendar: Bunkyū 2 (文久２年)
- Javanese calendar: 1790–1791
- Julian calendar: Gregorian minus 12 days
- Korean calendar: 4195
- Minguo calendar: 50 before ROC 民前50年
- Nanakshahi calendar: 394
- Thai solar calendar: 2404–2405
- Tibetan calendar: ལྕགས་མོ་བྱ་ལོ་ (female Iron-Bird); 1988 or 1607 or 835 — to — ཆུ་ཕོ་ཁྱི་ལོ་ (male Water-Dog); 1989 or 1608 or 836

1862 (MDCCCLXII) was a common year starting on Wednesday of the Gregorian calendar and a common year starting on Monday of the Julian calendar, the 1862nd year of the Common Era (CE) and Anno Domini (AD) designations, the 862nd year of the 2nd millennium, the 62nd year of the 19th century, and the 3rd year of the 1860s decade. As of the start of 1862, the Gregorian calendar was 12 days ahead of the Julian calendar, which remained in localized use until 1923.

== Events ==
American Civil War in 1862

=== January ===
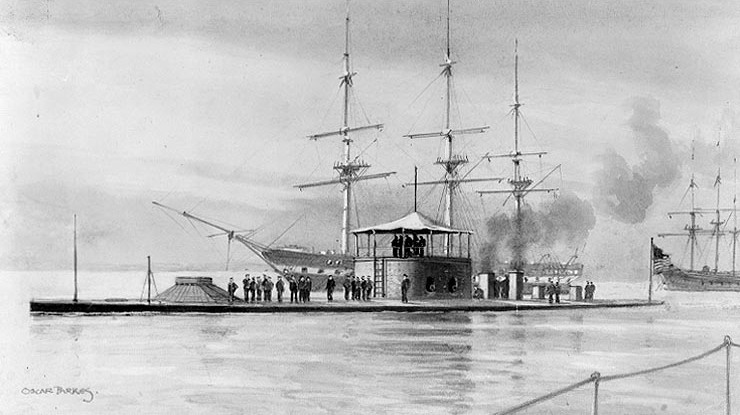
January 30: USS Monitor.

- January 1 – The United Kingdom annexes Lagos Island, in modern-day Nigeria.
- January 6 – French intervention in Mexico: French, Spanish and British forces arrive in Veracruz, Mexico.
- January 16 – Hartley Colliery disaster in north-east England: 204 men are trapped and die underground when the only shaft becomes blocked.
- January 30 – American Civil War: The first U.S. ironclad warship, USS Monitor, is launched in Brooklyn.
- January 31 – Alvan Graham Clark makes the first observation of Sirius B, a white dwarf star, through an eighteen-inch telescope at Northwestern University in Illinois.

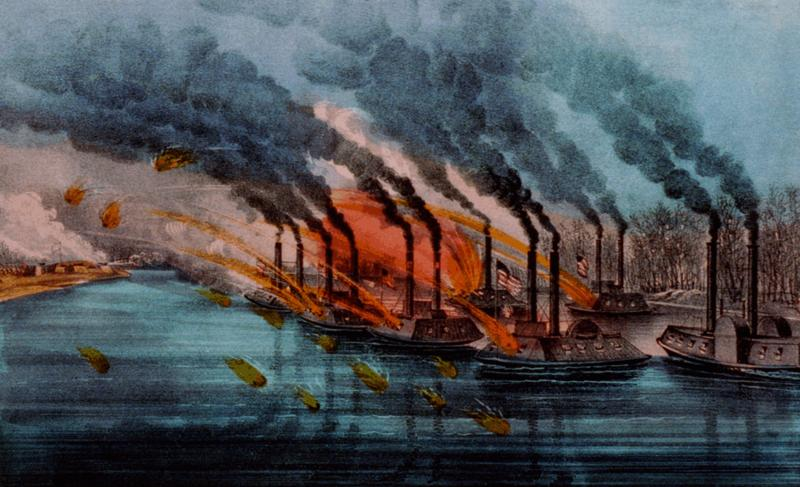
February 6: Battle of Fort Henry.

=== February ===
- February 1 – American Civil War: Julia Ward Howe's "Battle Hymn of the Republic" is published for the first time in the Atlantic Monthly.
- February 2 – The first railway is opened in New Zealand, by the Dun Mountain Copper Mining Company.
- American Civil War:
  - February 6 – General Ulysses S. Grant gives the Union Army its first victory of the war, by capturing Fort Henry, Tennessee.
  - February 11–16 – Battle of Fort Donelson – General Ulysses S. Grant attacks Fort Donelson, Tennessee, capturing it on the last day.
  - February 21 – Battle of Valverde – Confederate forces defeat Union troops near Fort Craig in New Mexico Territory:
  - February 22 – Jefferson Davis is officially inaugurated in Richmond, Virginia, to a six-year term as president of the Confederate States.

=== March ===
- March 6 – An ammunition warehouse explosion in San Andres Chalchicomula, Mexico, kills between 1,400 and 2,280 during the Second French intervention in Mexico.
- American Civil War:
  - March 7 – Battle of Pea Ridge – The Confederates are shut out of Missouri.
  - March 8 – Ironclad CSS Virginia (formerly USS Merrimack) is launched at Hampton Roads, Virginia; the Battle of Hampton Roads starts the same day.
- March 13
  - American Civil War: The U.S. federal government forbids all Union army officers from returning fugitive slaves, thus effectively annulling the Fugitive Slave Act of 1850 and setting the stage for the Emancipation Proclamation.
  - A smallpox epidemic in San Francisco spreads to British Columbia.
- March 17 – The first railway line in Finland, between the cities of Helsinki and Hämeenlinna, is officially opened.
- March 26–28 – American Civil War: Battle of Glorieta Pass – In New Mexico, Union forces succeed in stopping the Confederate invasion of New Mexico Territory.
- March 31 – Victor Hugo's epic French historical novel Les Misérables begins publication in Brussels.

=== April ===
- April 1 – Second French intervention in Mexico: The Spanish and the British ended their alliance with France.
- American Civil War:
  - April 5 – Battle of Yorktown – The battle begins when Union Army forces under General George B. McClellan close in on the Confederate capital of Richmond, Virginia.
  - April 6–7– Battle of Shiloh – The Union Army, under General Ulysses S. Grant, defeats the Confederates near Shiloh, Tennessee.
  - April 12 – Great Locomotive Chase (Andrews' Raid) – Union volunteers steal Confederate steam railroad locomotive The General (which will still exist in the 21st century) in an attempt to sabotage the rail network.
- April 13 – The government of Vietnam is forced to cede the territories of Biên Hòa, Gia Định and Định Tường to France.
- April 22 – Global financial group UBS is founded in Switzerland as the Bank in Winterthur.
- American Civil War:
  - April 25 – Capture of New Orleans – Forces under Union Admiral David Farragut occupy the Confederate city of New Orleans, securing access to the Mississippi River.
  - April 26 – Siege of Fort Macon – The besieged Confederate garrison at Fort Macon, North Carolina surrenders.

=== May ===
- May 1–November 1 – The 1862 International Exhibition is held at South Kensington in London; it is particularly noteworthy for an exhibit from Japan, influential in the development of Anglo-Japanese style.
- May 2 – The California State Normal School (later San Jose State University) is created by an Act of the California legislature.
- May 5 – Second French intervention in Mexico: Battle of Puebla – Mexican General Ignacio Zaragoza defeats the French Army; commemorated each year as Cinco de Mayo (Spanish for Fifth of May).
- May 11 – American Civil War: Ironclad CSS Virginia is scuttled in the James River northwest of Norfolk, Virginia.
- May 15 – U.S. President Abraham Lincoln signs a bill into law creating the U.S. Bureau of Agriculture (later renamed U.S. Department of Agriculture).
- May 20 – U.S. President Abraham Lincoln signs the Homestead Act into law.
- May 24 – Westminster Bridge is opened across the Thames in London. This new iron bridge, designed by Thomas Page, replaces the previous stone one.

=== June ===
- American Civil War:
  - June 1 – Battle of Fair Oaks – Both sides claim victory.
  - June 4 – Confederate troops evacuate Fort Pillow on the Mississippi River, leaving the way clear for Union Army troops to capture Memphis, Tennessee.
- June 5 – Treaty of Saigon: Emperor Tự Đức of the Nguyễn dynasty in Vietnam cedes Saigon, Côn Sơn Island and three southern provinces of what is to become known as French Cochinchina (Biên Hòa, Gia Định and Định Tường) to become part of the French colonial empire. Guerilla leader Trương Định refuses to recognize the treaty.
- American Civil War:
  - June 6 – First Battle of Memphis – Union Army troops capture Memphis, Tennessee, from the Confederate States.
  - June 8 – Battle of Cross Keys – Confederate troops under General Stonewall Jackson save the Army of Northern Virginia from a Union Army attack on the James Peninsula that is led by General George B. McClellan.
- June 12 – John Winter Robinson, the Secretary of State of Kansas, is convicted and removed from office as the result of a bond scandal, becoming the first state executive official to be impeached and removed from office in American history.
- June 26 – American Civil War: Battle of Mechanicsville – Confederate General Robert E. Lee defeats the troops of General George B. McClellan in the first of the Seven Days Battles.

=== July ===
- July 1
  - The Bureau of Internal Revenue, the forerunner of the Internal Revenue Service, is established in the United States.
  - Princess Alice, the second daughter of Queen Victoria, marries Prince Ludwig of Hesse and by Rhine.
  - U.S. President Abraham Lincoln signs into law the Pacific Railroad Acts, authorizing construction of the First Transcontinental Railroad.
  - The Russian State Library is founded, as The Library of the Moscow Public Museum.
- July 2 – U.S. President Abraham Lincoln signs the Morrill Land-Grant Act into law, creating a system of land-grant colleges, to teach agricultural and mechanical sciences across the United States.
- July 4 – Charles Dodgson (better known as Lewis Carroll) extemporises the story that becomes Alice's Adventures in Wonderland, for ten-year-old Alice Liddell and her sisters, on a rowboat trip on The Isis from Oxford to Godstow.

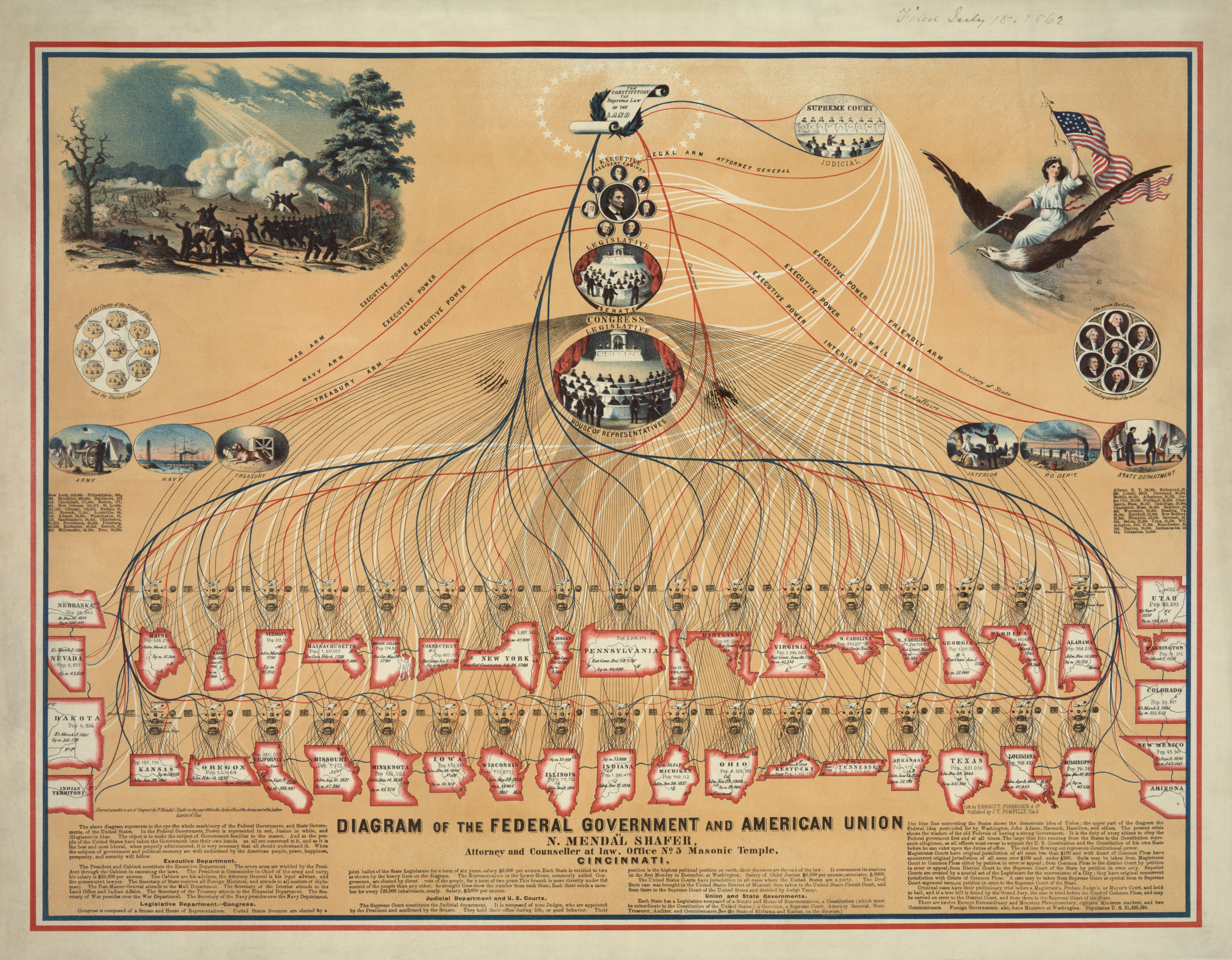
Diagram of US Federal Government and American Union. Published: 1862, July 15.

- July 16 – American Civil War: David Farragut becomes the first rear admiral in the U.S. Navy.
- July 18 – Dent Blanche, one of the highest summits in the Alps, is first ascended.
- July 23 – American Civil War: Henry Halleck takes command of the Union Army.

=== August ===
- American Civil War:
  - August 5 – Battle of Baton Rouge – Along the Mississippi River near Baton Rouge, Louisiana, Confederate troops drive Union forces back into the city.
  - August 6 – Confederate ironclad CSS Arkansas is scuttled on the Mississippi River after suffering damage in a battle with USS Essex, near Baton Rouge, Louisiana.
  - August 9 – Battle of Cedar Mountain – Confederate General Stonewall Jackson narrowly defeats Union forces under General John Pope at Cedar Mountain, Virginia.
- August 14 – U.S. President Abraham Lincoln meets with a group of prominent African-Americans, the first time an American President has done so. He suggests that Black people should migrate to Africa or to Central America, but this advice is rejected.
- August 17 – The Dakota War of 1862 begins in Minnesota, as Dakota Sioux attack white settlements along the Minnesota River. They are overwhelmed by the U.S. Army six weeks later.
- August 19
  - Dakota War of 1862: During an uprising in Minnesota, Dakota warriors decide not to attack heavily defended Fort Ridgely and instead turn to the settlement of New Ulm, killing white settlers along the way.
  - Horace Greeley publishes an editorial, "The Prayer of Twenty Millions", in the New York Tribune, in which he urges U.S. President Abraham Lincoln to make abolition of slavery an official aim of the Union war effort.
- August 21 – The Vienna Stadtpark opens its gates.
- American Civil War:
  - August 28–30 – Second Battle of Bull Run – Confederate forces inflict a crushing defeat on Union General John Pope.
  - August 29–30 – Battle of Richmond, Kentucky – Confederate forces, led by General Edmund Kirby Smith, inflict a crushing defeat on Union General William "Bull" Nelson.

=== September ===
- American Civil War:
  - September 1 – Battle of Chantilly – Confederate General Robert E. Lee leads his forces in an attack on retreating Union troops in Chantilly, Virginia, driving them away.
  - September 2 – U.S. President Abraham Lincoln restores Union General George B. McClellan to full command, after General John Pope's disastrous defeat at the Second Battle of Bull Run.
  - September 5 – In the Confederacy's first invasion of the North, General Robert E. Lee leads 55,000 men of the Army of Northern Virginia across the Potomac River at White's Ford near Leesburg, Virginia, into Maryland.
- September 10 – Francisco Solano López is appointed second President of Paraguay.
- American Civil War:
- September 17 – American Civil War:
  - Battle of Antietam: Union forces strategically defeat Confederate troops at Sharpsburg, Maryland, in the bloodiest day in U.S. history, with over 22,000 casualties.
  - The Allegheny Arsenal explosion results in the single largest civilian disaster during the war, with 78 workers – mostly young women – being killed.
- September 19 – Battle of Iuka – Union troops under Major General William Rosecrans defeat a Confederate force commanded by Major General Sterling Price at Iuka, Mississippi.
- September 22
  - Otto von Bismarck becomes Minister President of Prussia, following refusal by the country's Landtag to accept the military budget.
  - American Civil War: The preliminary announcement of the Emancipation Proclamation is made by U.S. President Abraham Lincoln: From January 1, 1863, slaves in the Confederate States will be considered free.
- September 26 – Johann II, Prince of Liechtenstein signs into law the 1862 Constitution of Liechtenstein.
- September 29 – New Prussian prime minister Otto von Bismarck delivers his Blood and Iron (Blut und Eisen) speech to the Prussian Landtag.

=== October ===
- October 8 – American Civil War: Battle of Perryville – Union Army forces under General Don Carlos Buell halt the Confederate invasion of Kentucky by defeating troops led by General Braxton Bragg at Perryville, Kentucky.
- October 9 – The Transvaal Civil War breaks out, following Stephanus Schoeman's unconstitutional ousting of the acting President of the Executive Council of the South African Republic.
- October 11 – American Civil War: In the aftermath of the Battle of Antietam, Confederate General J. E. B. Stuart and his men loot Chambersburg, Pennsylvania, during a raid into the North.
- October 23 – Otto is deposed as King of Greece.
- October 24 – Ramón Castilla loses the Presidency of Peru for a second time.
- October 25 – In the Granadine Confederation (modern-day Colombia), rebel troops of the southern states defeat government forces.

=== November ===
- November 4 – Richard Jordan Gatling patents the Gatling gun in the United States.
- November 5
  - American Civil War: President Abraham Lincoln removes George B. McClellan as commander of the Union Army.
  - American Indian Wars: In Minnesota, more than 300 Santee Sioux are found guilty of rape and murder of white settlers, and are sentenced to hang.
- American Civil War:
  - November 14 – President Abraham Lincoln approves the plan by General Ambrose Burnside to capture the Confederate capital city of Richmond, Virginia. This plan leads to a disastrous Union defeat at the Battle of Fredericksburg on December 13.
  - November 28
- American Civil War: Battle of Cane Hill – Union Army troops, led by General John Blunt, push back Confederate troops, commanded by General John Marmaduke, into the northwestern Boston Mountains of Arkansas.
- November 28 –
  - Notts County F.C. is founded in Nottingham, England, making it (by the 21st century) the world's oldest professional Association football team.

=== December ===
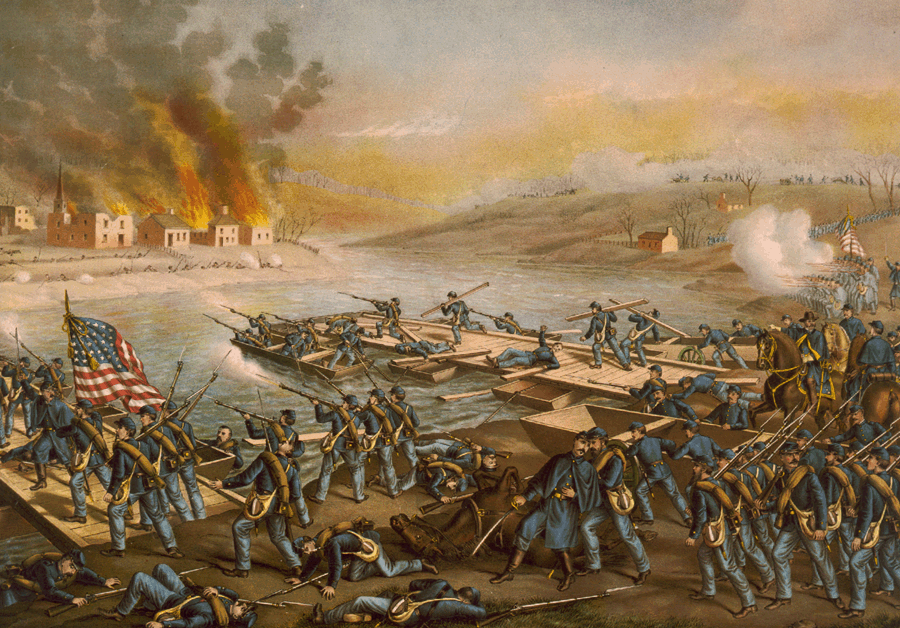
December 13: Battle of Fredericksburg.

- December 1 – In his State of the Union address, President Abraham Lincoln reaffirms the necessity of ending slavery, as he ordered ten weeks earlier in his Emancipation Proclamation.
- December 2 – The first United States Navy hospital ships enter service.
- American Civil War:
  - December 12 – Yazoo Pass Expedition – Union ironclad gunboat USS Cairo is sunk by a remotely-detonated "torpedo" (naval mine) while clearing mines from the Yazoo River, the first armored ship sunk by mine.
  - December 13 – Battle of Fredericksburg – The Union Army suffers massive casualties and abandons its attempts to capture the Confederate capital city of Richmond, Virginia.
  - December 17 – General Order No. 11, which expels all Jews from his military district, is issued by General Ulysses S. Grant. This order is rescinded just a few weeks later.
  - December 26–29 – Battle of Chickasaw Bayou – Another victory for the Confederate Army, outnumbered two to one, results in six times as many Union casualties, defeating several assaults commanded by Union general William T. Sherman.
  - December 30 – USS Monitor sinks in a storm in the Atlantic, off Cape Hatteras, North Carolina.
  - December 31 – American Civil War:
    - U.S. President Abraham Lincoln signs an act that admits West Virginia to the Union, thus dividing Virginia into two.
    - The Battle of Stones River opens near Murfreesboro, Tennessee.

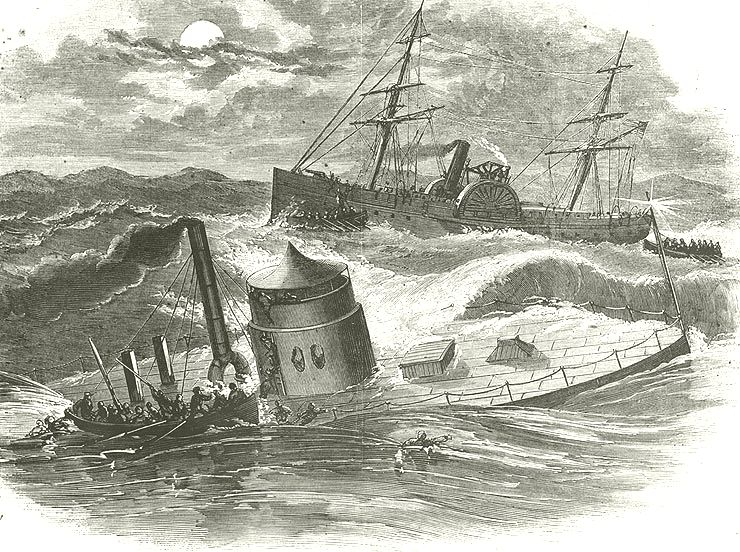
Dec. 30: Monitor sinks.

- December – Peruvian slave raiders land on Easter Island, beginning a decade of the destruction of the society and population on the island.

=== Date unknown ===
- Anglo-Indian teacher Anna Leonowens accepts an offer made by the Siamese consul in Singapore, Tan Kim Ching, to teach the wives and children of Mongkut, the King of Siam.
- Donald McIntyre builds a settlement in northwest Queensland (Australia) which becomes the town of Julia Creek (named after his niece).
- Iwai Fumisuke Shoten (岩井文助商店), predecessor of Japanese conglomerate Sojitz, is founded in Osaka.
- Japanese construction company Satō Kōgyō is founded in Toyama as Satō-gumi.

== Births ==
=== January–March ===
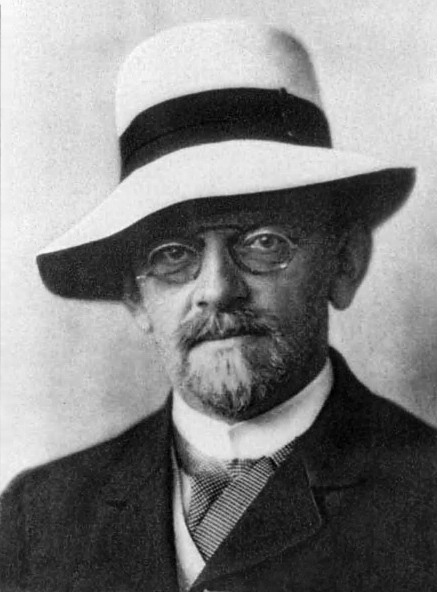
David Hilbert

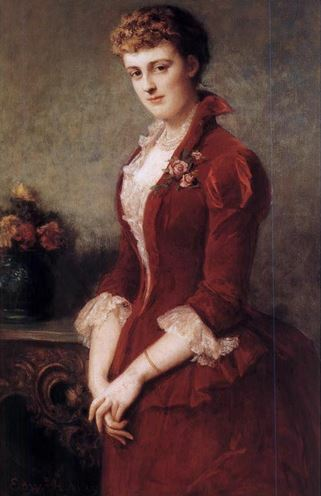
Edith Wharton

- January 9 – Carrie Clark Ward, American silent film actress (d. 1926)
- January 14 – Carrie Derick, Canadian botanist and geneticist (d. 1941)
- January 15 – Loie Fuller, American dancer (d. 1928)
- January 23 – David Hilbert, German mathematician (d. 1943)
- January 24 – Edith Wharton, American fiction writer (d. 1937)
- January 29 – Frederick Delius, English composer (d. 1934)
- January 30 – Walter Damrosch, German-born American orchestral conductor (d. 1950)
- February 3 – James Clark McReynolds, Associate Justice of the Supreme Court of the United States (d. 1946)
- February 4
  - Hjalmar Hammarskjöld, 13th Prime Minister of Sweden (d. 1953)
  - George Ernest Morrison, Australian adventurer, journalist (d. 1920)
- February 7 – Bernard Maybeck, American Arts and Crafts architect (d. 1957)
- February 8 – Ferdinand Ferber, French Army captain, aviation pioneer (d. 1909)
- February 17 – Edward German, English composer (d. 1936)
- March 4 – Robert Emden, Swiss astrophysicist, meteorologist (d. 1940)
- March 8 – George Frederick Phillips, Canadian-born American military hero (d. 1904)
- March 13 – Jane Delano, American founder of the American Red Cross Nursing Service (d. 1919)
- March 14 – Vilhelm Bjerknes, Norwegian physicist, meteorologist (d. 1951)
- March 25 – George Sutherland, American politician, Associate Justice of the Supreme Court of the United States (d. 1942)
- March 28 – Aristide Briand, French politician, winner of the Nobel Peace Prize (d. 1932)
- March 29 – Adolfo Müller-Ury, Swiss-born American painter (d. 1947)

=== April–June ===
- April 2 – Nicholas Murray Butler, American president of Columbia University, winner of the Nobel Peace Prize (d. 1947)
- April 6 – Georges Darien, French writer (d. 1921)
- April 11
  - Charles Evans Hughes, American jurist, politician, Chief Justice of the United States (d. 1948)
  - Lurana W. Sheldon, American author and editor (d. 1945)
- April 26 – Edmund C. Tarbell, American Impressionist painter (d. 1938)
- April 27 – Rudolph Schildkraut, Ottoman-born Austrian actor (d. 1930)
- May 15 – Arthur Schnitzler, Austrian dramatist, narrator (d. 1931)
- May 27 – John Kendrick Bangs, American author, satirist (d. 1922)
- June 5 – Allvar Gullstrand, Swedish ophthalmologist, winner of the Nobel Prize in Physiology or Medicine (d. 1930)
- June 7 – Philipp Lenard, Hungarian–German physicist, winner of the Nobel Prize in Physics (d. 1947)
- June 10 – John de Robeck, British admiral (d. 1928)
- June 21 – Damrong Rajanubhab, Thai prince, historian (d. 1943)
- June 27 – May Irwin, Canadian actress, singer (d. 1938)

=== July–September ===
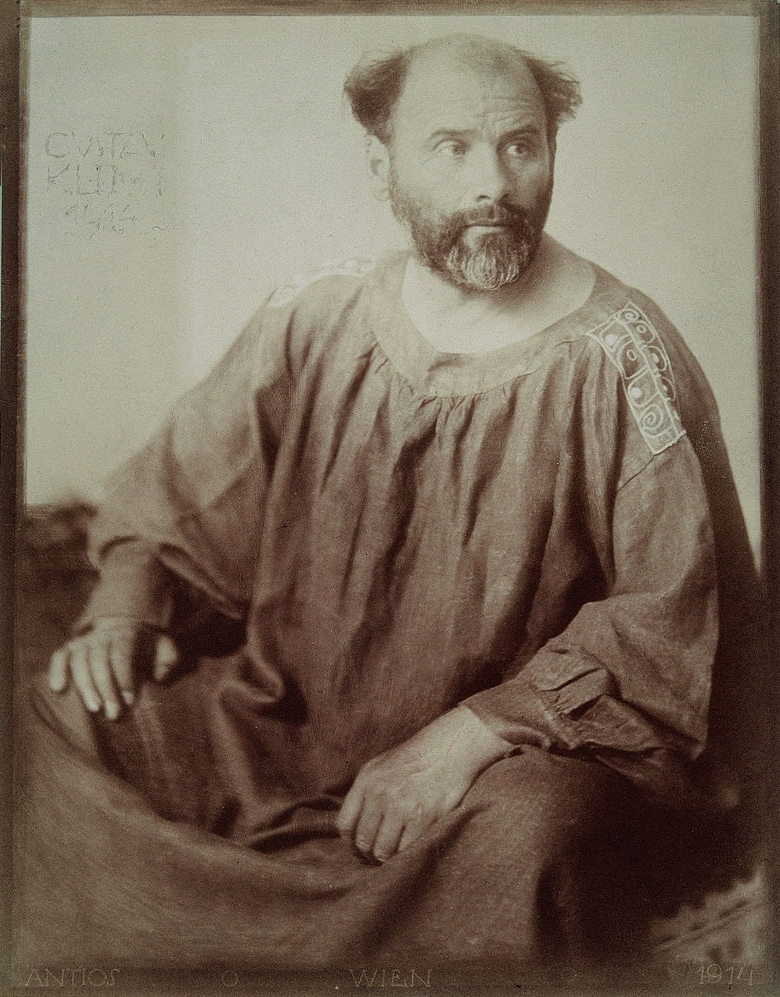
Gustav Klimt

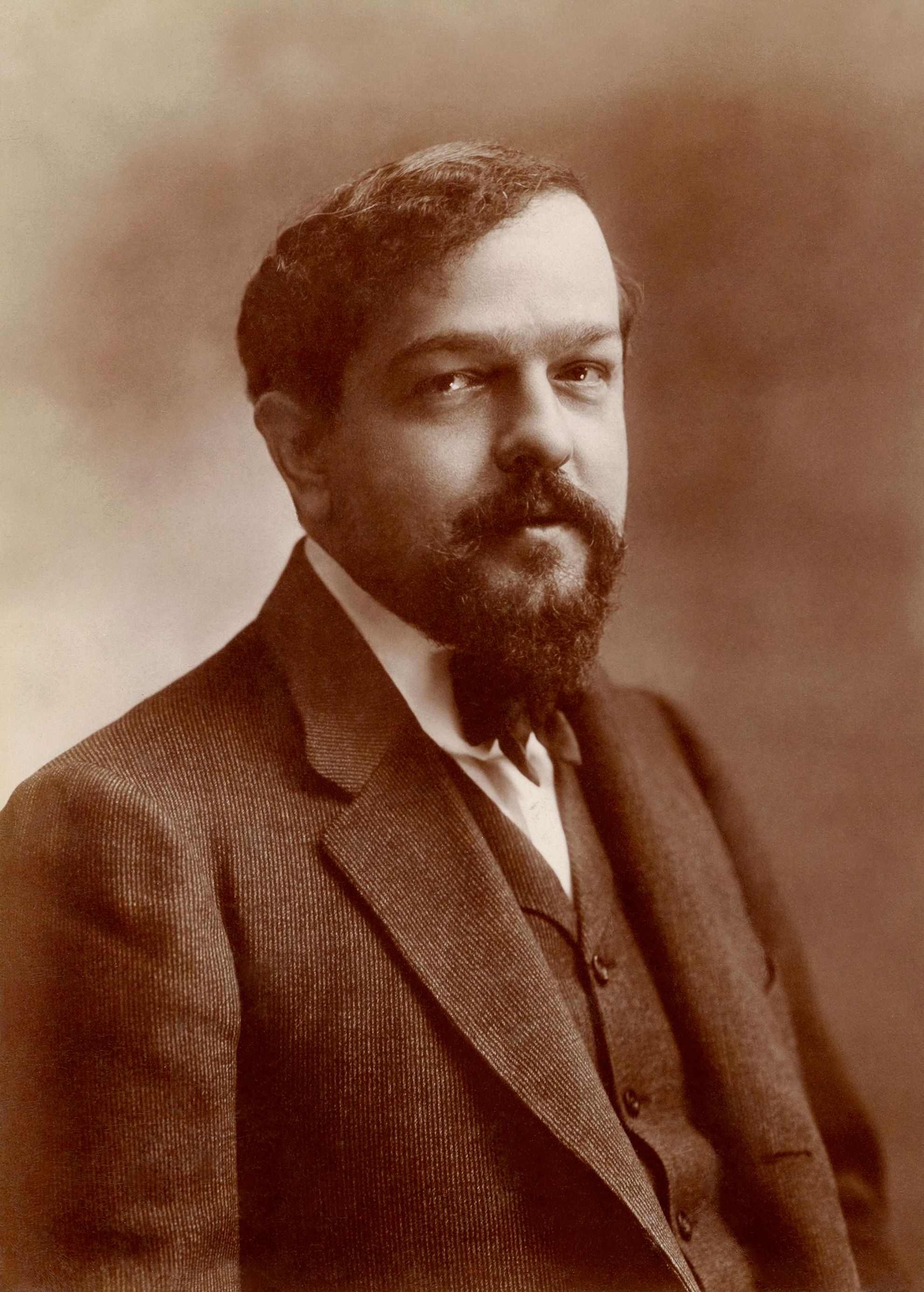
Claude Debussy

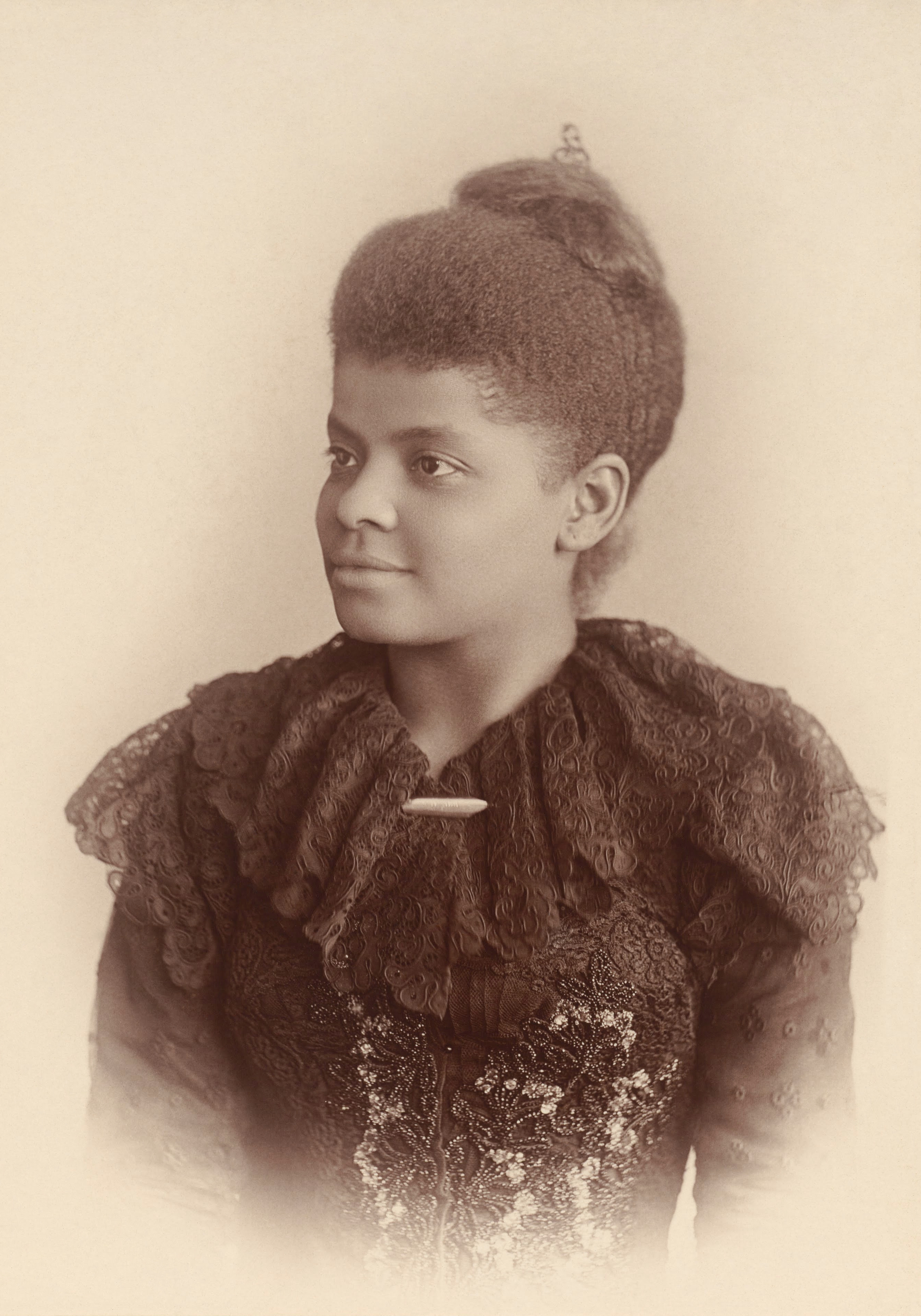
Ida B. Wells

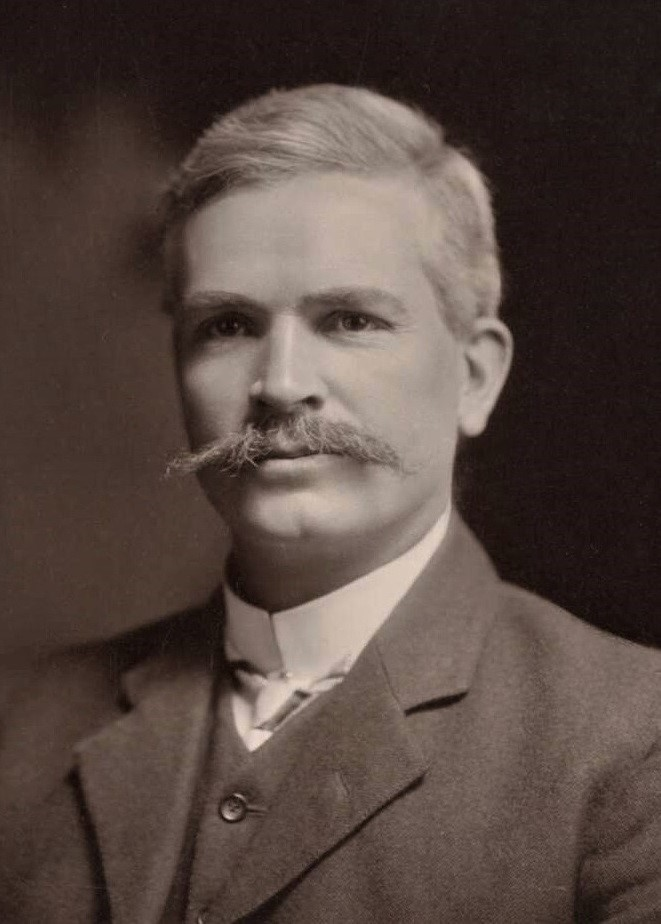
Andrew Fisher

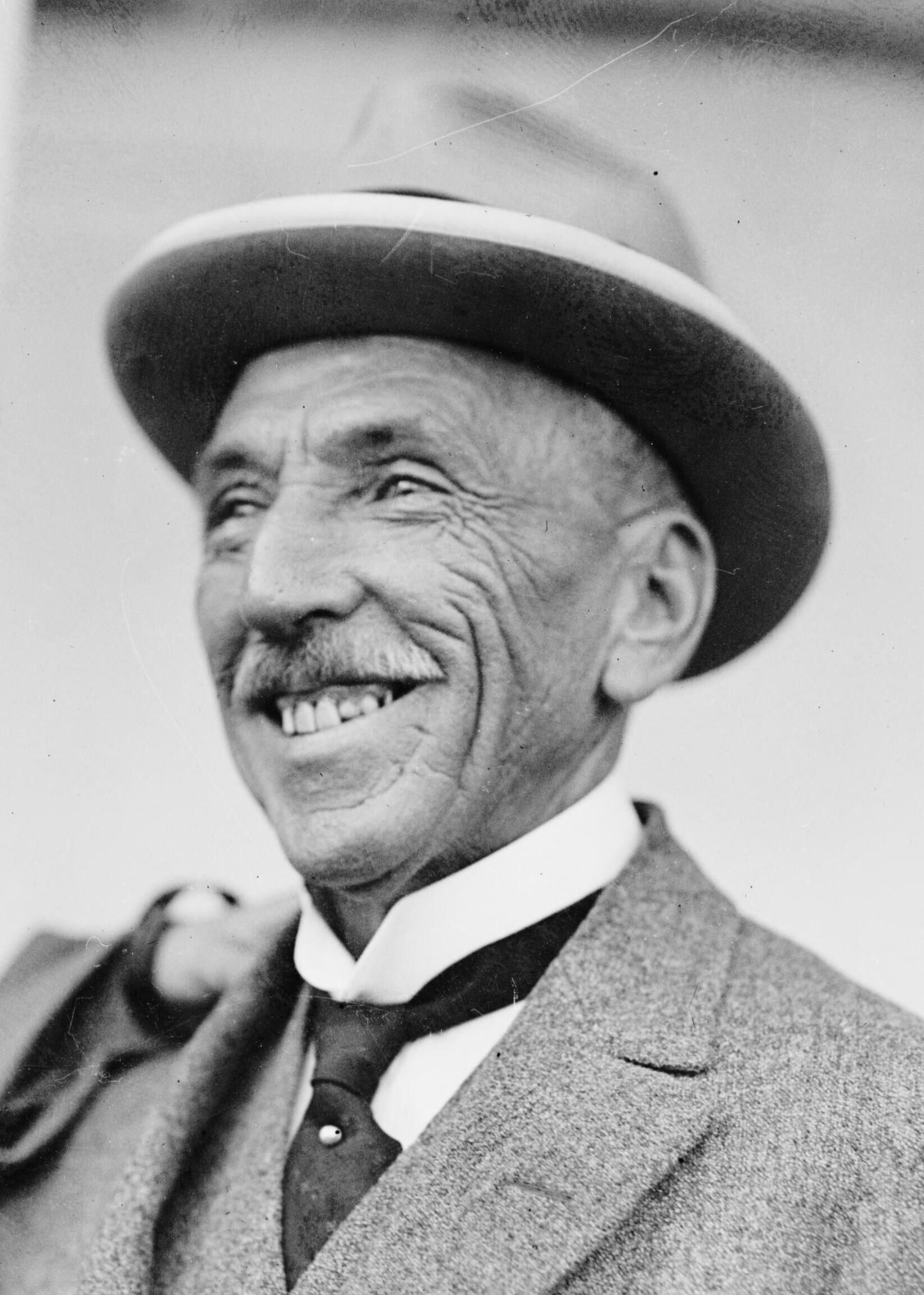
Billy Hughes

- July 2
  - William Henry Bragg, English physicist, Nobel Prize laureate (d. 1942)
  - Christopher Cradock, British admiral (d. 1914)
- July 8 – Josephine White Bates, Canadian-born American author (d. 1934)
- July 14
  - Florence Bascom, American geologist and educator (d. 1945)
  - Gustav Klimt, Austrian artist (d. 1918)
- July 15 – Ernest Troubridge, British admiral (d. 1926)
- July 16 – Ida B. Wells, American journalist, suffragist, and anti-lynching crusader (d. 1931)
- July 24 – Percy FitzPatrick, South African author, politician and mining financier (d. 1931)
- August 1 – M. R. James, English medievalist scholar and author (d. 1936)
- August 5 – Joseph Merrick (the Elephant Man), English sufferer from deformities (d. 1890)
- August 16 – Amos Alonzo Stagg, American football player, coach (d. 1965)
- August 21 – Emilio Salgari, Italian writer (d. 1911)
- August 22 – Claude Debussy, French composer (d. 1918)
- August 24 – Zonia Baber, American geographer and geologist (d. 1956)
- August 26 – Herbert Booth, English-born Salvationist, third son of William and Catherine Booth (d. 1926)
- August 29
  - Andrew Fisher, 5th Prime Minister of Australia (d. 1928)
  - Maurice Maeterlinck, Belgian writer, Nobel Prize in Literature laureate (d. 1949)
- September 7 – Edgar Speyer, American-born international financier and philanthropist (d. 1932)
- September 11
  - Julian Byng, 1st Viscount Byng of Vimy, British general, 12th Governor General of Canada (d. 1935)
  - Hawley Harvey Crippen, American-born medical practitioner, uxoricide (hanged 1910)
  - O. Henry, born William Sydney Porter, American short-story writer (d. 1910)
- September 12 – Carl Eytel, German-American artist working in Palm Springs, California (d. 1925)
- September 19 – Arvid Lindman, Swedish admiral, industrialist, and politician, 12th Prime Minister of Sweden (d. 1936)
- September 22 – Anastasios Charalambis, Prime Minister of Greece (d. 1949)
- September 23 – Denis Auguste Duchêne, French general (d. 1950)
- September 25 – Billy Hughes, 7th Prime Minister of Australia (d. 1952)
- September 27 – Louis Botha, Boer general, first Prime Minister of South Africa (d. 1919)

=== October–December ===
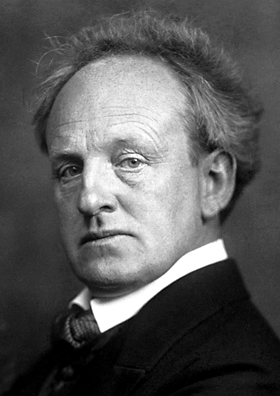
Gerhart Hauptmann

- October 3 – Johnny Briggs, English cricketer (d. 1902)
- October 12 – Theodor Boveri, German biologist (d. 1915)
- October 13 – Mary Kingsley, English explorer (d. 1900)
- October 18 – Mehmet Esat Bülkat, Ottoman general (d. 1952)
- October 19 – Auguste Lumière, French inventor (d. 1954)
- October 26 – Hilma af Klint, Swedish abstract painter (d. 1944)
- October 27 – Hugh Evan-Thomas, British admiral (d. 1928)
- October 28 – Nicholas Timothy Clerk, Gold Coast theologian, missionary and Presbyterian minister (d. 1961)
- November 5 – Annie Laurie Wilson James, American journalist focused on horses (unknown year of death)
- November 14 – George Washington Vanderbilt II, American businessman (d. 1914)
- November 15 – Gerhart Hauptmann, German writer, Nobel Prize laureate (d. 1946)
- November 16 – Charles Turner, Australian cricketer (d. 1944)
- November 19 – Billy Sunday, American baseball player, evangelist and prohibitionist (d. 1935)
- November 23 – Ernest Guglielminetti, Swiss physician (d. 1943)
- November 24 – Konrad Krafft von Dellmensingen, Bavarian general (d. 1953)
- December 5
  - William Walker Atkinson, American spiritual writer (d. 1932)
  - John Henry Leech, English entomologist (d. 1900)
- December 8 – Georges Feydeau, French playwright (d. 1921)
- December 12 – J. Bruce Ismay, English shipping magnate, White Star Line (d. 1937)
- December 15 – Adrien Loir, French biologist, bacteriologist (d. 1941)
- December 25 – Wilhelm Weinberg, German physician (d. 1937)

=== Date unknown ===
- Al Herpin (The Man Who Never Slept), notable French-born American insomniac (d. 1947)
- Jessie King, Scottish author (unknown year of death)
- Antoinette Kinney, American state senator (d. 1945)
- Sufi Azizur Rahman, Bengali Muslim theologian and teacher (d. 1922)

== Deaths ==
=== January–June ===
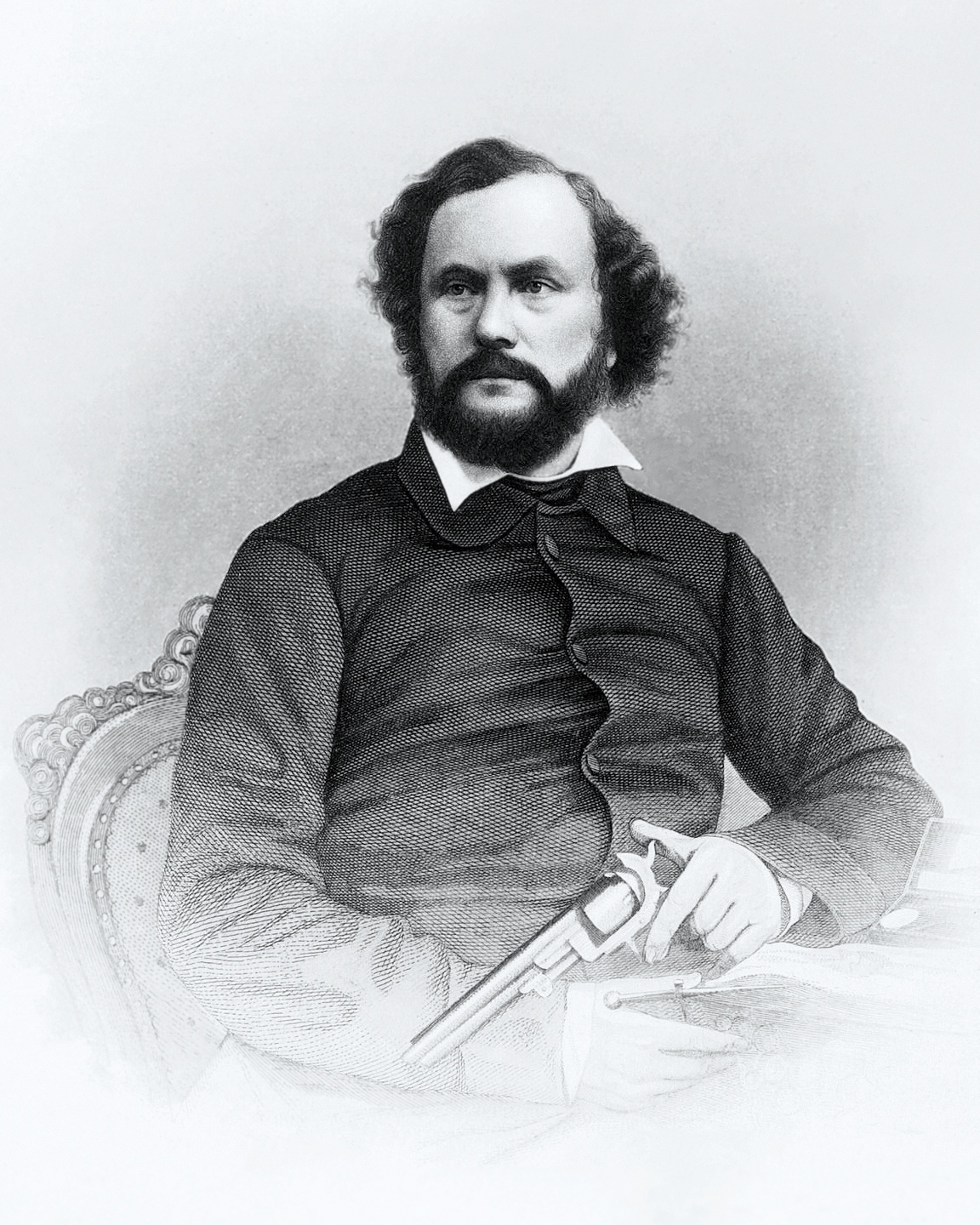
Samuel Colt

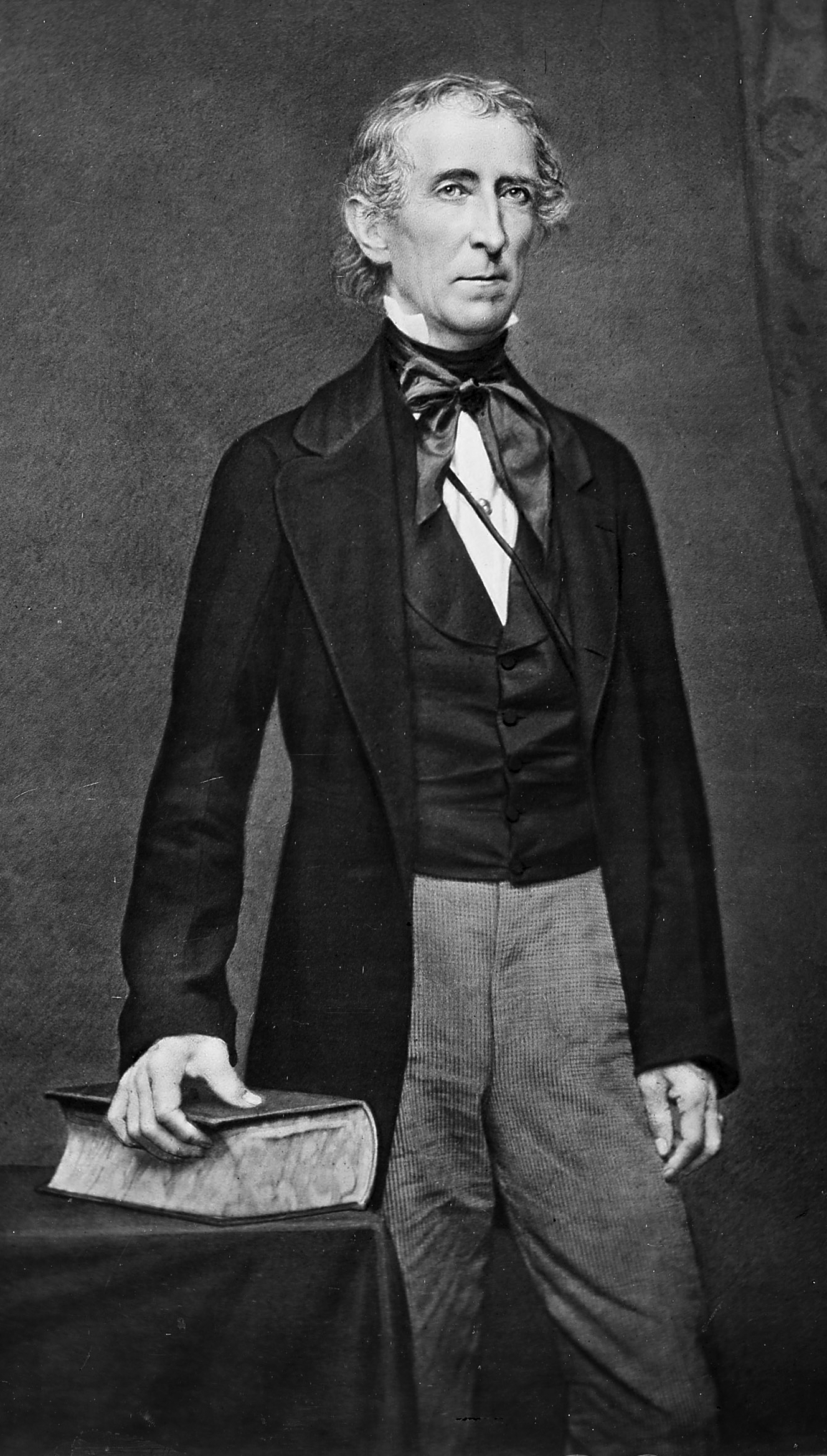
John Tyler

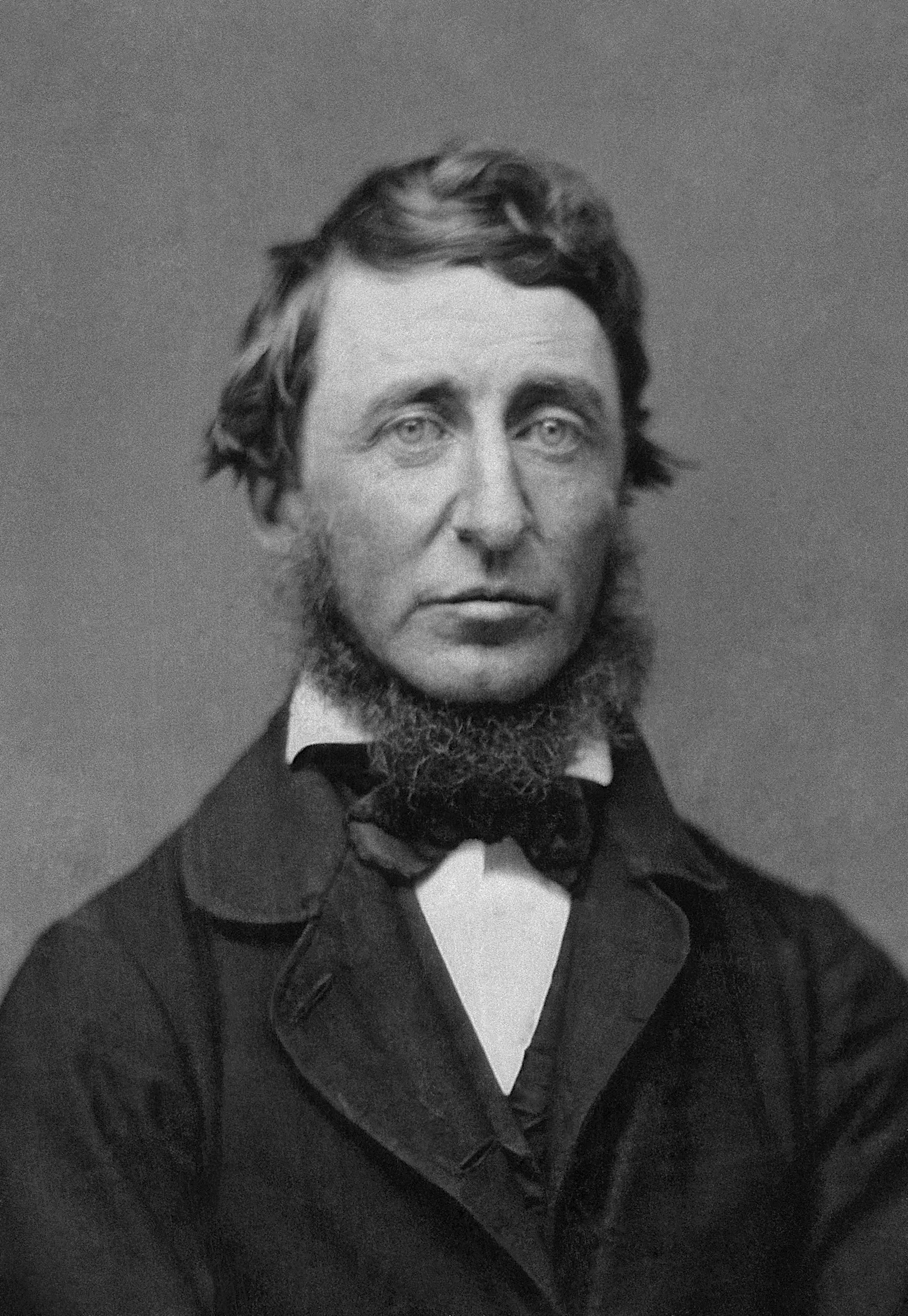
Henry David Thoreau

- January 10 – Samuel Colt, American firearms inventor (b. 1814)
- January 18 – John Tyler, 71, 10th President of the United States (b. 1790)
- January 20 – Harriet Auber, English poet (b. 1773)
- February 3 – Jean-Baptiste Biot, French physicist, astronomer and mathematician (b. 1774)
- February 7
  - Francisco de Paula Martínez de la Rosa y Berdejo, Prime Minister of Spain (b. 1787)
  - Prosper Ménière, French scientist (b. 1799)
- February 20
  - Francisco Balagtas, Filipino poet (b. 1788)
  - William Wallace "Willie" Lincoln, third son of U.S. President Abraham Lincoln and Mary Todd Lincoln (b. 1850)
- February 21 – Justinus Kerner, German physician (b. 1786)
- February 24 – Bernhard Severin Ingemann, Danish novelist, poet (b. 1789)
- February 25 – Jonathan Hine, English hosiery manufacturer (b. 1778)
- March 22 – Manuel Robles Pezuela, former President of Mexico (executed) (b. 1817)
- April 6 – Albert Sidney Johnston, American Confederate general (b. 1803)
- April 9 – John Thomas, English Victorian sculptor (b. 1813)
- April 10 – W. H. L. Wallace, American Civil War Union general (died of wounds) (b. 1821)
- April 19 – Louis P. Harvey, Governor of Wisconsin (b. 1820)
- May 6 – Henry David Thoreau, American author, philosopher (b. 1817)
- May 16 – Edward Gibbon Wakefield, English theorist of colonization (b. 1796)
- May 21 – John Drew Sr., Irish-American actor, manager (b. 1827)
- May 25 – Juana Azurduy de Padilla, South American guerrilla military leader (b. c. 1781)
- May 29
  - Henry Thomas Buckle, English historian sometimes called "the father of scientific history" (b. 1821)
  - Franciszek Mirecki, Polish composer, music conductor, and music teacher (b. 1791)
- June 3 – John Lea, American epidemiologist (b. 1782)
- June 17 – Charles Canning, 1st Earl Canning, English Viceroy of India (b. 1812)
- June 20 – Barbu Catargiu, 1st Prime Minister of Romania (b. 1807)

=== July–December ===
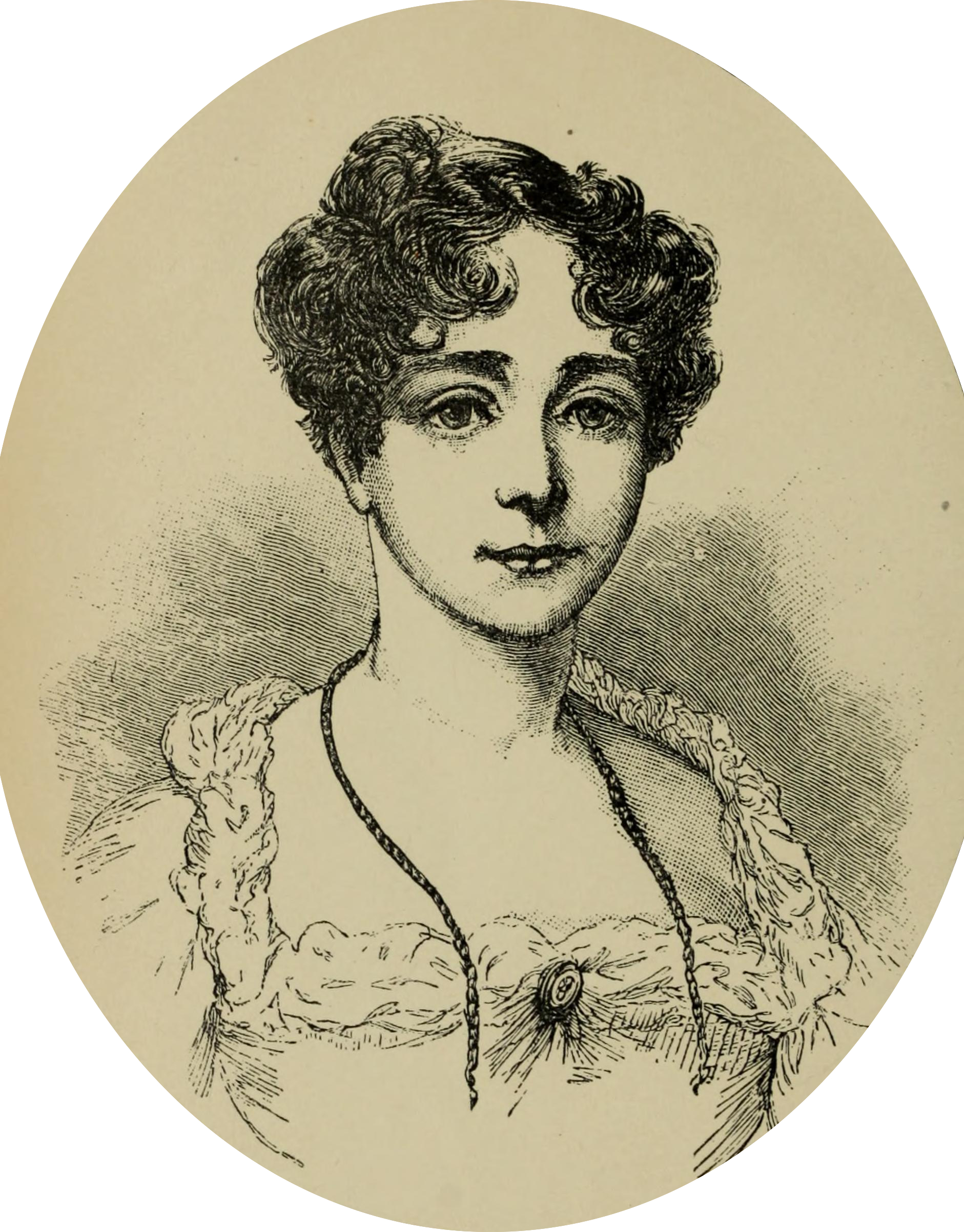
Judith Montefiore

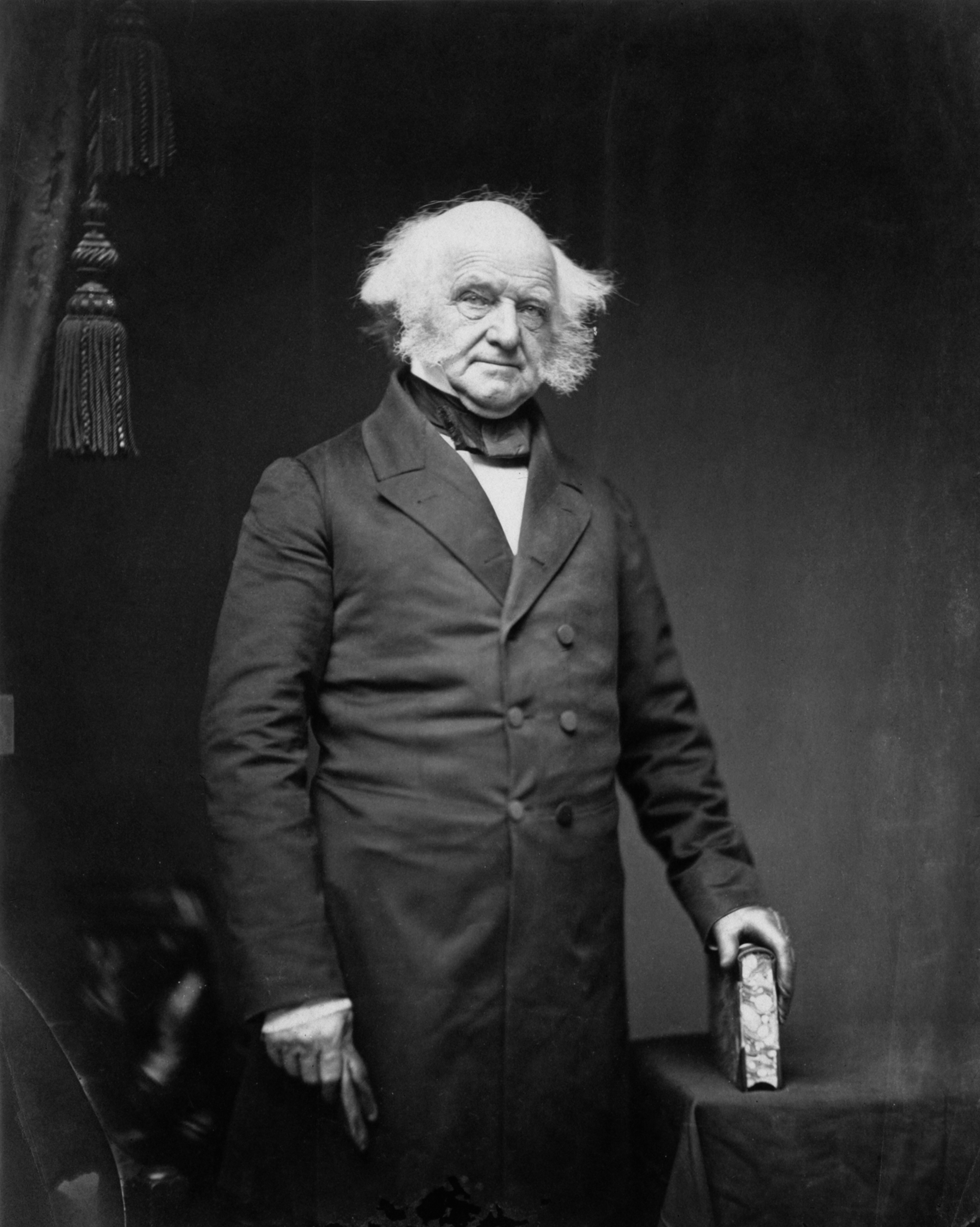
Martin Van Buren

- July 23 – José María Bocanegra, 3rd President of Mexico (b. 1787)
- July 24 – Martin Van Buren, 79, 8th President of the United States (b. 1782)
- August 18 – Simon Fraser, Canadian explorer (b. 1776)
- August 20
  - Javiera Carrera, Chilean independence fighter (b. 1771)
  - Ernst Guhl, German art historian (b. 1818)
- September 3 – Shusaku Honinbo, Japanese Go player (b. 1829)
- September 6 – John Sumner, Archbishop of Canterbury (b. 1780)
- September 10 – Carlos Antonio López, president of Paraguay (b. 1792)
- September 14 – Charles Lennox Richardson, English merchant murdered in Japan (b. 1834)
- September 24
  - Judith Montefiore, British linguist (b. 1784)
  - Anton Martin Slomšek, Slovene Roman Catholic bishop (b. 1800)
- October 8 – James Walker, Scottish engineer (b. 1781)
- October 15 – Hans Daniel Ludwig Friedrich Hassenpflug, German statesman (b. 1794)
- November 7 – Bahadur Shah II, 19th and Last mughal emperor (b. 1775)
- November 13 – Ludwig Uhland, German poet (b. 1787)
- November 17 – Mary Whitwell Hale, American school founder (b. 1810)
- December 4 – James Bennett (minister), English congregational minister (b. 1774)
- December 13 – Thomas Reade Rootes Cobb, American Confederate general (killed in action) (b. 1823)
- December 18 – Barbara Fritchie, American Civil War patriot (b. 1766)
