= Ari Laptev =

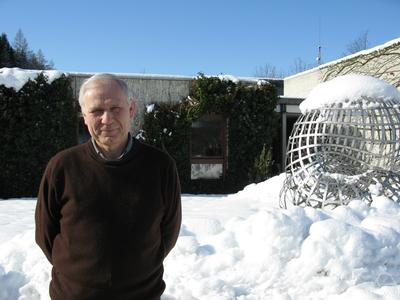
- Born: August 10, 1950 (age 76); Kyiv, Ukraine SSR, Soviet Union
- Citizenship: Sweden
- Education: St. Petersburg State University
- Awards: Royal Society Wolfson Research Merit Award (2007)
- Scientific career
- Fields: Mathematics
- Workplaces: Royal Institute of Technology
- Doctoral advisor: Michael Solomyak

Ari Laptev (born August 10, 1950) is a mathematician working on the spectral theory of partial differential equations.

His PhD was obtained in 1978 at Leningrad State University under the supervision of Michael Solomyak.

He is currently Professor at both the KTH in Stockholm and Imperial College London. From 2001 to 2003 Laptev served as the President of the Swedish Mathematical Society.

In the years 2007–2010 he served as the President of the European Mathematical Society.

In April 2007 he was awarded the Royal Society Wolfson Research Merit Award.

He was from 2011 to 2018 the Director of Institut Mittag-Leffler.

He is Editor-in-Chief of Acta Mathematica, Editor-in-Chief of Arkiv för Matematik, Deputy Chief Editor of the "Journal of Spectral Theory", Editor of the "Bulletin of Mathematical Sciences", Editor of "Problems in Mathematical Analysis", and Editor of "Izvestiya Vysshikh Uchebnykh Zavedenii. Matematika".

== Other sources ==
- http://www.ma.ic.ac.uk/~alaptev/CV/Laptev_CV_Imperial.pdf
