= Allvar Gullstrand =

Swedish ophthalmologist and optician

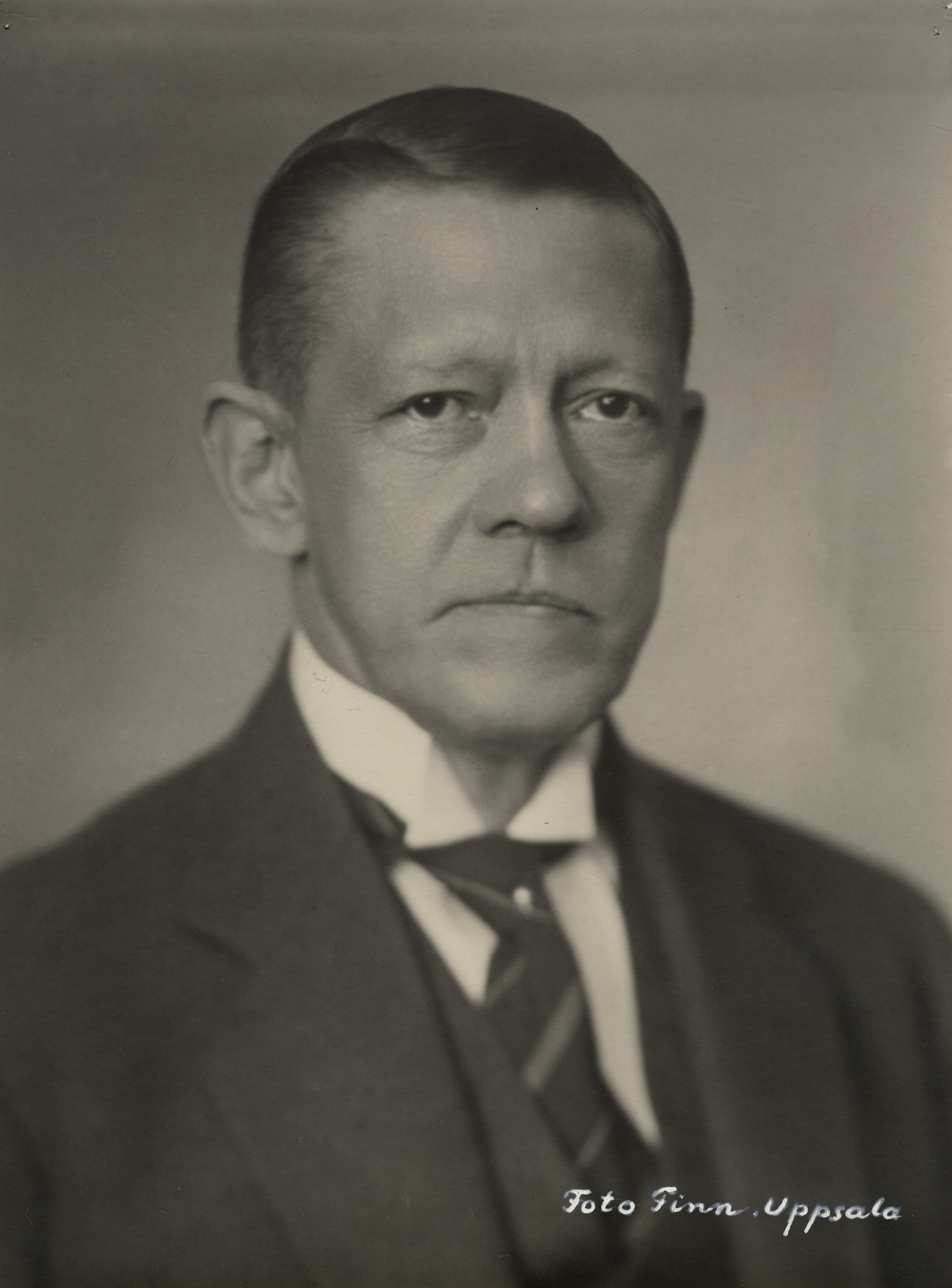
- Born: 5 June 1862; Landskrona, Sweden
- Died: 28 July 1930 (aged 68); Stockholm, Sweden
- Known for: Mathematical model of the human eye, research on astigmatism Gullstrand–Painlevé coordinates
- Spouse: Signe Breitholtz
- Awards: Björkénska priset (1906); Nobel Prize in Physiology or Medicine (1911)
- Scientific career
- Fields: Ophthalmology
- Institutions: University of Uppsala

Allvar Gullstrand (5 June 1862 – 28 July 1930) was a Swedish ophthalmologist and optician.

== Life ==
Born at Landskrona, Sweden, Gullstrand was professor (1894–1927) successively of eye therapy and of optics at the University of Uppsala. He applied the methods of physical mathematics to the study of optical images and of the refraction of light in the eye. For this work, he received the Nobel Prize in Physiology or Medicine in 1911.

Gullstrand is noted also for his research on astigmatism and for improving the ophthalmoscope and corrective lenses for use after removal of a cataract from the eye.

Gullstrand married Signe Breitholtz (1862–1946) in 1885.

He was elected a member of the Royal Swedish Academy of Sciences in 1905, and served on the Academy's Prize Committee for Physics. While serving on the committee in 1921, he used his position to block Albert Einstein, whose 14 nominations were far more than any other scientist, from receiving a Nobel Prize in Physics for his theory of relativity, which Gullstrand believed to be wrong. His fifty-page report stated, "Einstein's work is not useful enough for the human race...we should wait for measurable evidence.” This was in conflict with earlier statements in the report, that the bending of light measured during a solar eclipse and the precession of the orbit of Mercury, were inconclusive, since the results might not be valid or explained by some other phenomenon. Such arguments were reasonable when Einstein was first nominated in 1910, but not following very public confirmations in 1918. Such was Gullstrand's reputation that the committee, unable to give the prize to Einstein but unable to award it to anyone else, gave nobody the prize that year. (Einstein was instead retroactively awarded the 1921 prize for the photoelectric effect when Gullstrand was replaced by Carl Wilhelm Oseen in 1922, with Niels Bohr concurrently being awarded the 1922 prize).

Gullstrand investigated the Einstein field equations further with his paper "General solution of the static one-body problem in Einstein's theory of gravity", which was published in the Swedish journal Arkiv för matematik, astronomi och fysik in 1922. The one-body problem refers to the Schwarzschild metric, and as Paul Painlevé published similar results, the coordinates for the solution are known as the Gullstrand–Painlevé coordinates.

Due to the mathematical content of Gullstand's writing, Horatio Burt Williams lamented in 1926 that "there are few ophthalmologists and not many physiologists who are able to read [Gullstrand's papers] and for the same reason that the chemists of Gibbs' day were unable to read his work."

Gullstrand died in Stockholm in 1930, where he was interred at Norra begravningsplatsen.

== Works ==
- 1904: "Zur Kenntnis der Kreispunkte", Acta Mathematica 29:59–100.
- 1906: "Vie réelle optische Abbildung", Kungl. Svenska Vetenskapsakademiens Handlingar 41
- 1908: "Die optische Abbildung im heterogenen Medien und die Dioptrik der Kristal-linse des Menschen", Kungl. Svenska Vetenskapsakademiens Handlingar 43
- 1905: "Über Astigmatismus, Koma und Aberration", Annalen der Physik,(4), 18: 941-973
- 1907: "Tatsachen und Fiktionen in der Lehre von der optischen Abbildung", Archiv für Optik, vol.1 p. 2;
- 1911: Speech at the Nobel Banquet in Stockholm, December 10, 1911
- 1919: "Preparation of non spherical surfaces for optical instruments", Kgl. Svenska Vetenskapsakademiens Handlingar, vol. 60: 155, abstracted in Zeitschrift für Instrumentenkunde, vol. 41 (1921), pp. 123–25
- 1922: "Allgemeine Lösung des statischen Einkörperproblems in der Einsteinschen Gravitationstheorie", Arkiv för Matematik, Astronomi och Fysik 16(8):1–15

== See also ==
- Corneal topography
- Optical aberration
- Perceptual paradox
- Slit lamp
