= Moons (disambiguation) =

Moons are celestial bodies that orbit planets or smaller bodies.

Moons may also refer to:

- Moonmoon, a "moon of a moon"
- 7805 Moons, a main-belt asteroid
- Ellen Moons, Belgian materials scientist
- Jan Moons (born 1970), Belgian footballer
- Harvey balls, ideograms used for comparing qualitative information

== See also ==
- Moon (disambiguation)
- Mooning
