= Arkiv för Zoologi =

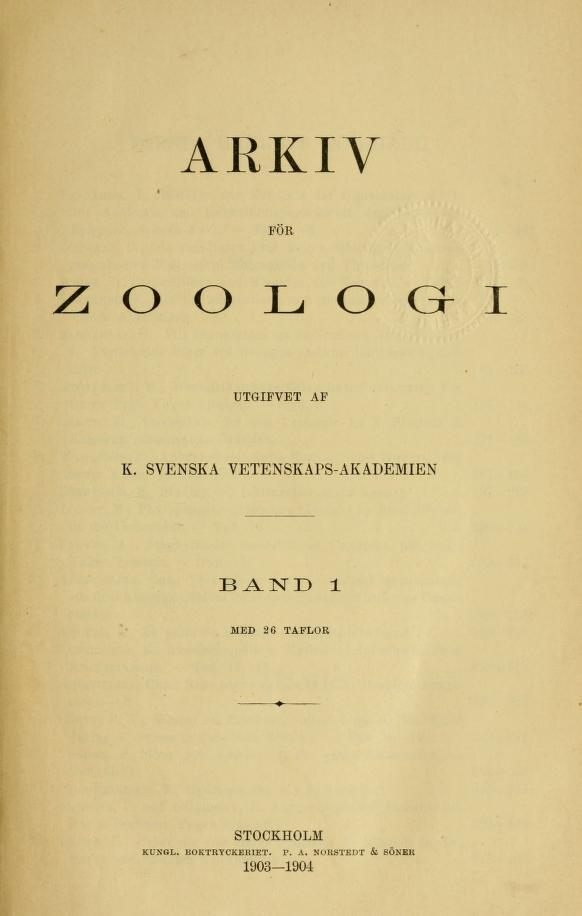
- Discipline: Zoology
- Language: English, French, German, Swedish

Publication details
- Former names: Bihang till Kongl. Svenska Vetenskaps-akademiens handlingar. Afdelning IV, Zoologi
- History: 1903–1974
- Publisher: Royal Swedish Academy of Sciences

Standard abbreviations
- ISO 4: Ark. Zool.

Indexing
- CODEN: ARZOAG
- ISSN: 0004-2110

Arkiv för Zoologi was a scientific journal on zoology, published by the Royal Swedish Academy of Sciences between 1903 and 1974. Prior to 1903, zoology articles were published in a supplement to the Transactions of the Academy. Arkiv för Zoologi was superseded by the journal Zoologica Scripta established in 1972.
