= Zoologica Scripta =

- Discipline: Zoology
- Language: English
- Edited by: Lutz Bachmann

Publication details
- Former name(s): Norwegian Journal of Zoology
- History: 1972–present
- Publisher: Wiley-Blackwell on behalf of the Norwegian Academy of Science and Letters and the Royal Swedish Academy of Sciences
- Frequency: Bimonthly
- Open access: Hybrid
- Impact factor: 3.140 (2020)

Standard abbreviations
- ISO 4: Zool. Scr.

Indexing
- CODEN: ZLSCA8
- ISSN: 0300-3256 (print); 1463-6409 (web)

Links
- Journal homepage

Zoologica Scripta is a bimonthly peer-reviewed scientific journal on systematic zoology, published by Wiley-Blackwell on behalf of the Norwegian Academy of Science and Letters and the Royal Swedish Academy of Sciences. It was established in 1972. The editor-in-chief since 2023 is Lutz Bachmann (Natural History Museum at the University of Oslo). According to the Journal Citation Reports, the journal has a 2020 impact factor of 3.140, ranking it 12th out of 174 journals in the category "Zoology".

== See also ==
- Arkiv för Zoologi
