= Mittag-Leffler Institute =

Mathematical research institute in Sweden

Coordinates: 59.3956°N 18.0851°E

Mittag Leffler Institute.

The Mittag-Leffler Institute (Swedish: Institut Mittag-Leffler) is a mathematical research institute in Sweden. Located in Djursholm, a suburb of Stockholm, it invites scholars to participate in half-year programs in specialized mathematical subjects. The Institute is run by the Royal Swedish Academy of Sciences on behalf of research societies representing all the Scandinavian countries. The institute focuses on hosting half-year programmes in specialised mathematical subjects, inviting scholars from around the world to collaborate in a focused, contemplative atmosphere. It houses a mathematical library with rare historical collections and continues Mittag-Leffler's vision of mathematics as an intellectual pursuit that transcends national boundaries. The institute is housed in the former villa of Mittag-Leffler, which was converted into a research facility.

== History ==
Gösta Mittag-Leffler (1846–1927) originally envisaged the institute, announcing on his seventieth birthday in 1916 that he and his wife would donate their fortune to found a centre for mathematics. During his lifetime he assembled an extensive mathematical library and hosted visiting scholars at his villa. After earning his doctorate from Uppsala University in 1872, he studied in Paris and Berlin, where he was influenced by Karl Weierstrass. He held professorships at the University of Helsinki from 1875 and at Stockholm University from 1880, and contacts with Charles Hermite and others shaped his belief that mathematics should transcend national boundaries.

Following Mittag-Leffler's death in 1927, realisation of his dream faced financial setbacks when his fortune—invested largely in German government bonds—declined after the First World War. Torsten Carleman was appointed director and maintained the library and occasional lectures but was unable to establish a full institute before his death in 1948. For two decades the library persisted under the Academy's mathematics class, and in the 1960s the sale of complete runs of Acta Mathematica provided fresh funding.

In 1967, Lennart Carleson revitalised the project using a personal professorship from the Swedish government. He relocated to Djursholm and inaugurated the first scientific programme on harmonic analysis in 1969–70. Rather than adopting a permanent-faculty model, Carleson followed Mittag-Leffler's vision of year-long gatherings of visiting researchers, securing support from the Academy of Finland, the Knut and Alice Wallenberg Foundation and other Scandinavian bodies.

== Organisation and activities ==
The institute is one of seven under the Royal Swedish Academy of Sciences, with an endowment of about 125 million Swedish krona in the late 1990s covering nearly half its budget. Additional funds come from foundations, the Swedish Natural Sciences Research Council and contributions from other Nordic countries. A small administrative staff manage daily operations, while the Academy's mathematics class, national representatives and international advisors form the board.

Each year-long programme, running from September to May, focuses on a single mathematical theme and is organised by a committee that must include at least one or two Scandinavian scholars. A scientific leader oversees seminars and spends at least one term on site. The institute hosts five to ten postdoctoral researchers and a varying number of senior visitors—accommodating up to twenty-eight residents at once—and emphasises informal interaction through twice-weekly seminars and weekly tea gatherings.

== Facilities ==
The Kuskvillan house at the Mittag Leffler Institute.

The institute occupies the villa that Mittag-Leffler built in the 1890s and remodelled in 1907 by Ferdinand Boberg, set within seven acres of parkland in Djursholm. The Swedish-style interior features an oak-panelled library with a gallery, a round "flower room" with marble flooring and distinctive details such as dachshund-shaped fireplace gratings and owl motifs. Visitor housing includes two historic cottages and two modern buildings added during the institute's expansion.

== Library and archival collections ==
Mittag-Leffler's original collection, acquired across Europe, forms the core of a remarkable library with rare books and complete leather-bound runs of key journals. The institute holds about 250 current journal subscriptions—fewer than major university libraries—but receives additional titles in exchange for issues of Acta Mathematica and Arkiv för Matematik.

The Institute's archives contain correspondence and personal papers of several prominent figures in nineteenth- and early twentieth-century mathematics. More than forty boxes hold the Nachlass of Karl Weierstrass, comprising letters, lecture manuscripts and drafts of his work on analytic and elliptic functions, together with correspondence with contemporaries such as Sophie Kovalevsky and Felix Klein. Separate collections preserve the papers of Sophie Kovalevsky, Georg Cantor, Henri Poincaré and Philip Jourdain, including letters, unpublished manuscripts and family documents.

In addition to personal papers, the archives include fifty volumes of Weierstrass's lecture manuscripts (circa 1860s–1880s), numerous boxes of mathematical notes and offprints, and the facsimile collection of Prince Baldassarre Boncompagni, which comprises about five thousand reproductions of medieval and early modern mathematical manuscripts. The holdings also feature early nineteenth-century materials such as Niels H. Abel's original papers on transcendental functions and correspondence between Carl Jacobi and Adrien-Marie Legendre on elliptic function theory.

== Legacy and significance ==
Despite its modest size, the institute has been instrumental in the growth of Swedish mathematics. From only a handful of professors when Mittag-Leffler began teaching, Sweden now has over one hundred in the field. The range of research has broadened from classical analysis to algebra, topology, algebraic geometry, combinatorics and computational mathematics, aided by the institute's role in introducing Scandinavian scholars to international developments.

== Notable connections ==
The institute maintains a close link to Acta Mathematica, founded by Mittag-Leffler in 1882. Originally conceived for Scandinavian contributions at Sophus Lie's suggestion, it quickly became international through efforts to secure papers from Henri Poincaré and others. In 1889, after publication of Poincaré's prize-winning work on the three-body problem, Mittag-Leffler famously recalled and corrected the entire issue—a testament to his commitment to precision.

A first-edition copy of Copernicus's "De revolutionibus orbium coelestium" (On the Revolutions of Heavenly Spheres) was stolen from the Mittag-Leffler Institute in 2000.
