= Al Herpin =

American sufferer of Insomnia

Al Herpin (January 1, 1862 (Note: The sources are contradictory on the birth year: the 1904 New York Times article said 1862, but the 1947 article said 94 years (corresponding to 1853).) in Paris – January 3, 1947) was an American known as the "Man Who Never Slept".

Al Herpin, who lived in Trenton, New Jersey, claimed to have never slept. The supposed cause is unknown. While claims such as his have occasionally appeared in newspapers, there is a recognized medical consensus that all humans require sleep, and that they do so even if they are not aware of it.

A piece in The New York Times on February 29, 1904, reported that:

Albert Herpin, born in France in 1862 and for fifteen years a hostler in the employ of Freeholder Walter Phares of this city, declares that he has not slept a wink during the past ten years. Notwithstanding this, he is in perfect health, and does not seem to suffer any discomfort from his remarkable condition.

Al Herpin died on January 3, 1947, reportedly at the age of 94. His obituary in The New York Times read:

Death came today for Alfred [sic] E. Herpin, a recluse who lived on the outskirts of the city and insisted that he never slept. He was 94 years old and, when questioned concerning his claim of "sleeplessness", maintained that he never actually dozed but merely "rested".

No other person with total insomnia has lived for such a long period of time. It was likely that he died for other reasons, not sleep deprivation, as his insomnia did not seem to have any effect on his health.

== See also ==
- Paul Kern, Hungarian soldier who supposedly never slept after gunshot to the head
- Fatal familial insomnia
