= John Lea (epidemiologist) =

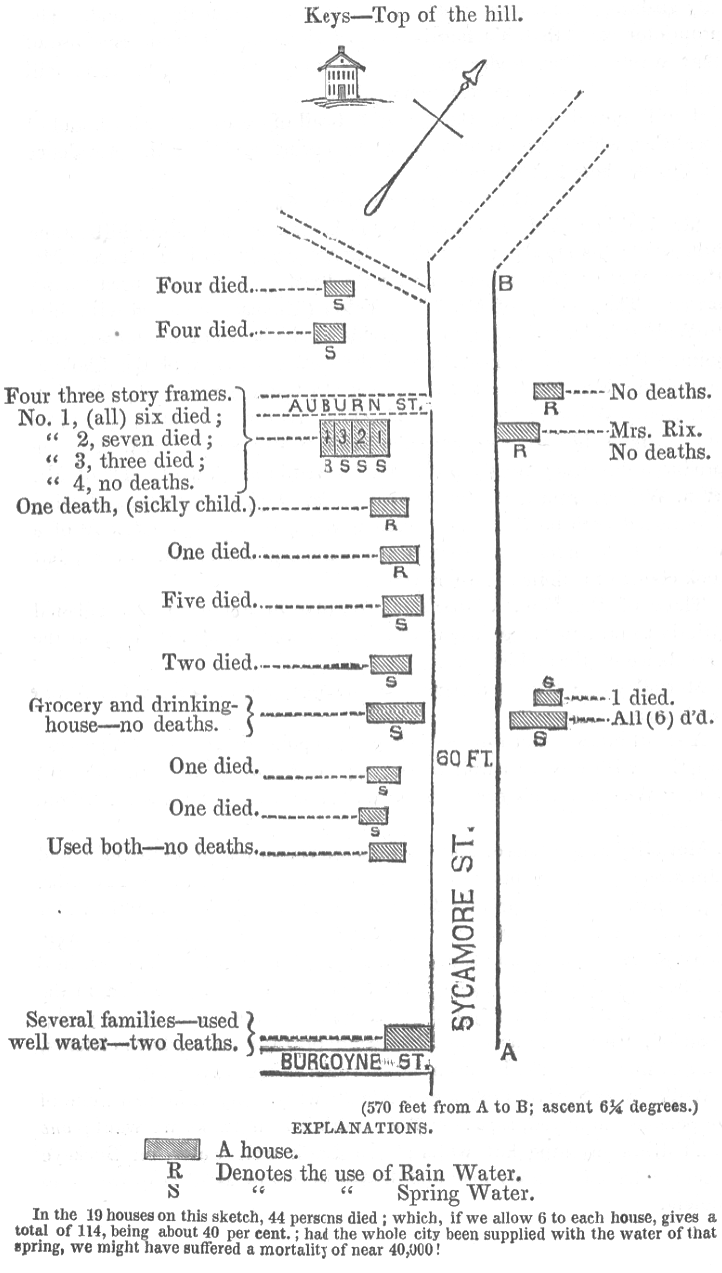
- Scientific career
- Fields: Epidemiology

John Lea (born 27 January 1782, died 3 June 1862, Cincinnati, Ohio) was a lay epidemiologist most noted today for his contribution to understanding the water-borne nature of cholera.

== Biography ==
Lea's description of an outbreak of cholera in Cincinnati, Ohio in 1849, presaged some of the techniques used later by John Snow in his famous investigation of the 1854 outbreak of cholera in London, England, including a detailed map of the residences of those struck with cholera in relation to their water supply. John Lea's proposed etiological mechanism, more closely aligned with the popular Miasma theory of his day, does not match our current understanding of the microbial nature of cholera; however, his recommended approach to limiting the spread of cholera (using rain water or boiled water) would have been an effective preventive.
