= Ellen Moons =

Materials scientist and academic

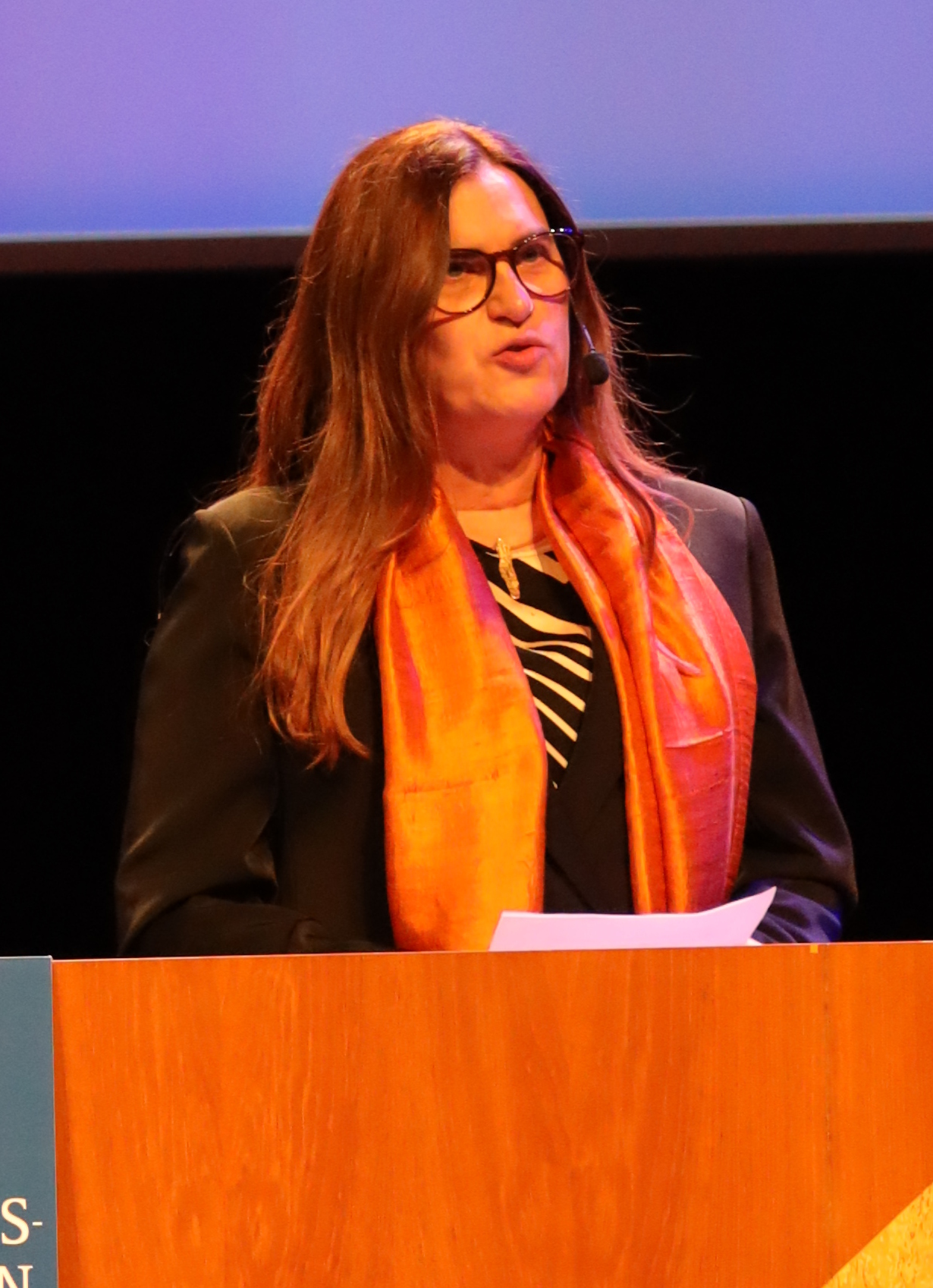
- Moons in 2024
- Education: Weizmann Institute of Science
- Scientific career
- Workplaces: University of Cambridge; Delft University of Technology; École Polytechnique Fédérale de Lausanne; Cambridge Display Technology; Karlstad University
- Thesis: Linking the interfacial chemistry and physics of CuInSe₂- and CdTe-based photovoltaic cells and diodes (1995)

Ellen Moons is a Belgian materials scientist who is a professor at Karlstad University. Her research considers the organisation of molecules and materials in thin films. She is mainly interested in organic and hybrid materials for solution processed photovoltaics.

== Early life and education ==
Moons is from Belgium. As an undergraduate, she studied physics at Ghent University. After finishing her physics studies with a licentiate degree, she was awarded a scholarship by the Israeli Foreign Ministry, and spent half a year at the Weizmann Institute in Israel. She decided to stay for doctoral studies, and worked at the Department of Materials and Interfaces at the Weizmann Institute of Science alongside David Cahen. Her doctoral research considered photovoltaic cells based on thin film copper indium diselenide and cadmium telluride. These thin film photovoltaics have lower costs than silicon based devices, and have a small carbon footprint. Moons was a postdoctoral researcher at École Polytechnique Fédérale de Lausanne and at the Delft University of Technology from 1996 to 1998. Her research considered dye-sensitised solar cells.

In 1998, Moons worked as a research associate at the University of Cambridge, and worked alongside Richard Friend.. During this time she held a joint position as a research scientist at Cambridge Display Technology, 1998-2000, where she worked on polymer light-emitting diodes. Since October 2000 she is affiliated to Karlstad University in Sweden.

She has been elected to the position of Secretary General of the Royal Swedish Academy of Sciences starting in 2026.

== Research and career ==
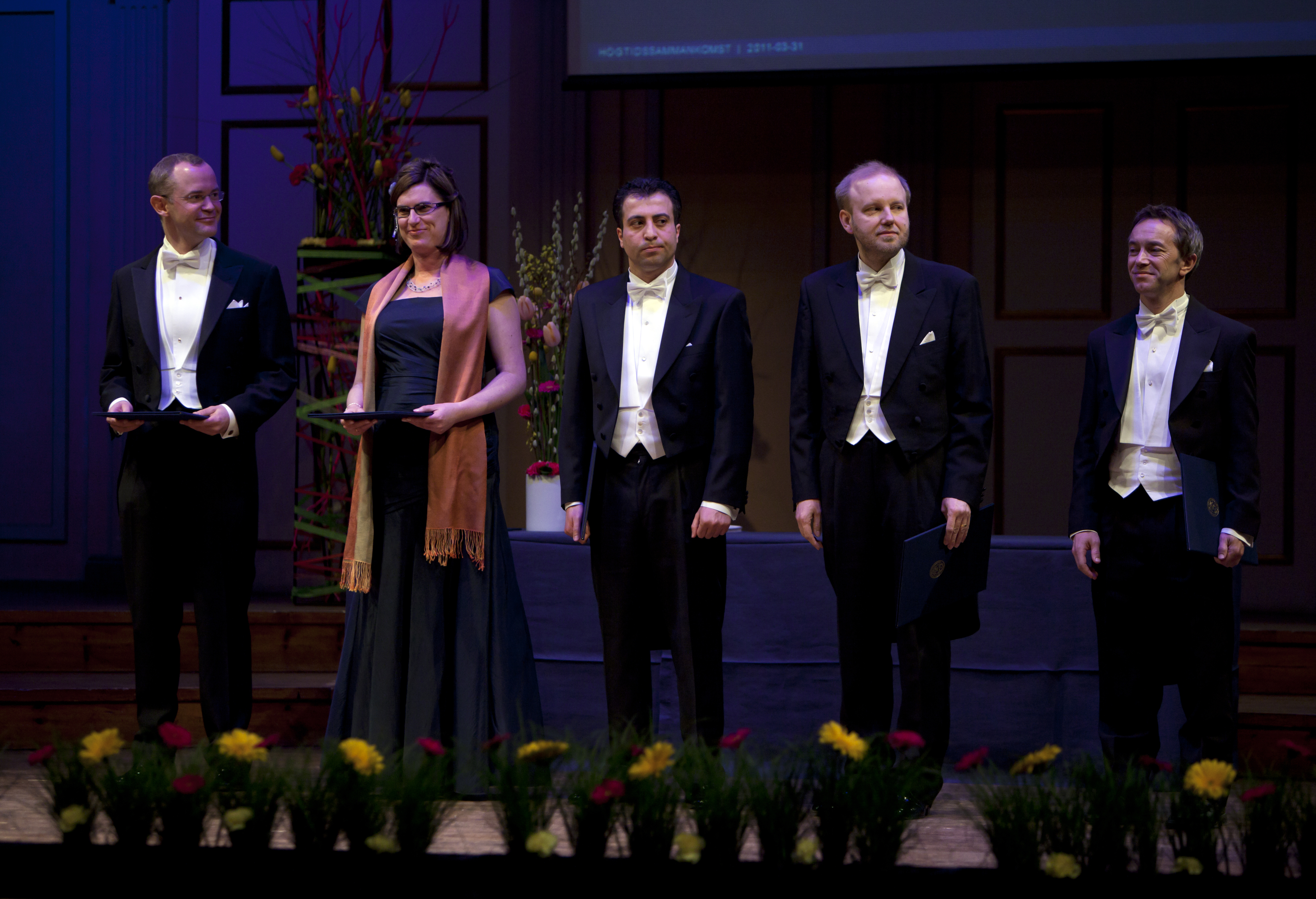
Moons receiving the Göran Gustafsson Prize in 2011

Moons joined Karlstad University in 2000. In 2011 she was awarded the Göran Gustafsson Prize. At the time, Karlstad primarily focussed on polymer-based photovoltaics. Moons expanded this research area, introducing new materials and investigations into structure-property relationships. Moons works to understand degradation mechanisms within emerging energy materials in an effort to improve device performance, stability and lifetime.

Moons' group have helped to correlate solar cell morphology with performance. In particular, she helped to explain how the donor and acceptor domains that form within the active layers of solar cells during solution processing impact their performance. Her work on morphology was supported by the K. A. Wallenberg foundation. Alongside the morphology of the active layer, she has studied how the device energetics (e.g. energy levels of the interlayers and interfaces) impact device performance.

Moons has made use of atomic force microscopy to understand nanoscale features on the surface of her thin films. To interrogate the chemical composition of these domains, Moons has shown it is possible to combine atomic force microscopy with infrared spectroscopy. To probe the bulk structure of the thin films, Moons uses dynamic secondary ion mass spectrometry.

In 2018, Moons was elected to the Royal Swedish Academy of Sciences. She was one of five women in the fifty-five-member physics class, and the first member from Karlstad University to be elected. She said she would use the position to advance the role of physics in society. As part of this role, she served on the Nobel Committee for Physics and delivered a YouTube lesson describing the science that won the 2018 Nobel Prize in Physics. Since 1 January 2026, she is the Secretary General of the Royal Swedish Academy of Sciences. She is the first woman to hold this position since the founding of the society in 1739.

== Selected publications ==
- Lukas Schmidt-mende; Fechtenkötter A; Müllen K; Moons E; Friend RH; MacKenzie JD (1 August 2001). "Self-organized discotic liquid crystals for high-efficiency organic photovoltaics". Science. 293 (5532): 1119–1122. Bibcode:2001Sci...293.1119S. doi:10.1126/science.293.5532.1119. ISSN 0036-8075. PMID 11498585. Wikidata Q43703054.
- F. Zhang; K. G. Jespersen; C. Björström; et al. (20 March 2006). "Influence of Solvent Mixing on the Morphology and Performance of Solar Cells Based on Polyfluorene Copolymer/Fullerene Blends". Advanced Functional Materials. 16 (5): 667–674. doi:10.1002/adfm.200500339. ISSN 1616-301X. Wikidata Q62002579.
- A.C. Morteani; A.S. Dhoot; J.-S. Kim; et al. (16 October 2003). "Barrier-Free Electron–Hole Capture in Polymer Blend Heterojunction Light-Emitting Diodes". Advanced Materials. 15 (20): 1708–1712. doi:10.1002/adma.200305618. ISSN 0935-9648. Wikidata Q58012374.
