= Arkiv för Matematik =

- Discipline: Mathematics
- Language: English
- Edited by: Hans Ringström

Publication details
- Former name(s): Arkiv för matematik, astronomi och fysik
- History: 1949–present
- Publisher: International Press of Boston
- Frequency: Biannual
- Open access: Yes
- Impact factor: 0.896 (2020)

Standard abbreviations
- ISO 4: Ark. Mat.

Indexing
- CODEN: AKMTAJ
- ISSN: 0004-2080 (print); 1871-2487 (web)
- LCCN: 53033846
- OCLC no.: 00855484

Links
- Journal homepage; Online access

The Arkiv för Matematik is a biannual peer-reviewed open-access scientific journal covering mathematics. The journal was established in 1949 when Arkiv för matematik, astronomi och fysik was split into separate journals, and is currently published by the International Press of Boston on behalf of the Institut Mittag-Leffler of the Royal Swedish Academy of Sciences. The current Editor-in-Chief is Hans Ringström.

The journal is indexed by Mathematical Reviews and Zentralblatt MATH. Its 2009 MCQ was 0.47.

According to the Journal Citation Reports, the journal has a 2020 impact factor of 0.896, ranking it 177th out of 330 journals in the category "MATHEMATICS".
