= Arkiv för matematik, astronomi och fysik =

Arkiv för matematik, astronomi och fysik (standard abbreviation Ark. Mat. Astr. Fys.) was a scientific journal edited by the Royal Swedish Academy of Sciences (Kungliga Svenska Vetenskapsakademien). It covered mathematics, astronomy and physics.

It started with volume 1 dated 1903/04. The last volume 32 appeared 1945/46. Then the journal was split into:

- Arkiv för Matematik
- Arkiv för Fysik
- Arkiv för Astronomi
- Arkiv för Geofysik

Contributions were published in English, French, German, and Swedish.
