= Annie Laurie Wilson James =

American journalist

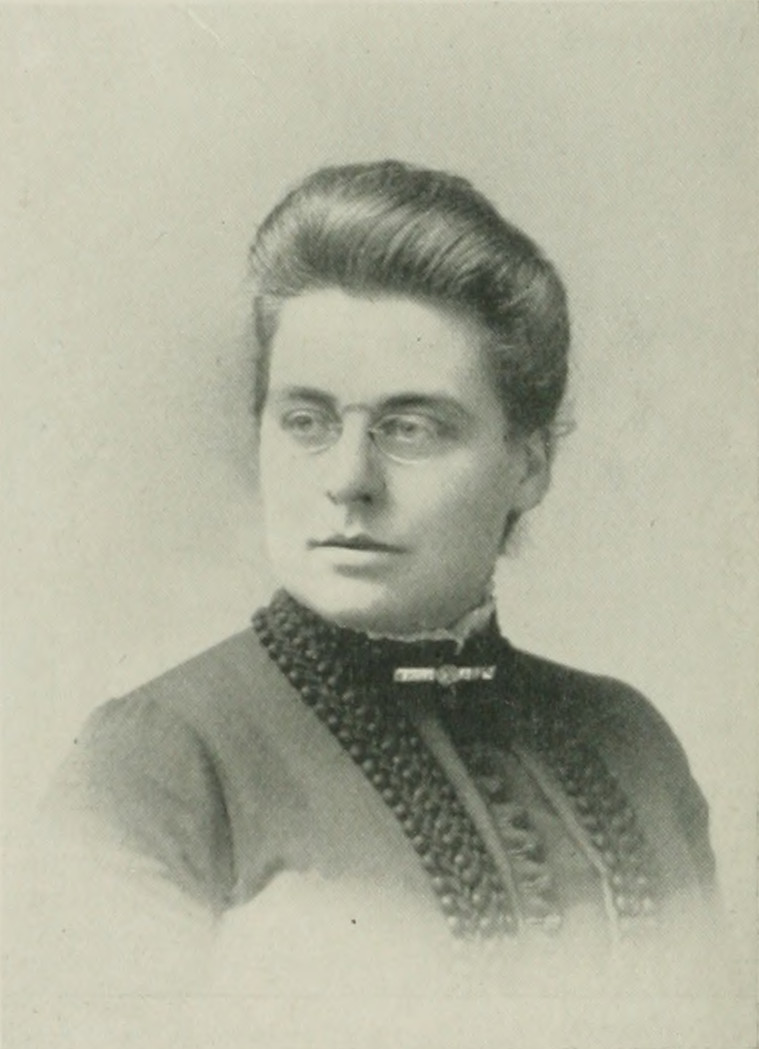
- Born: Annie Laurie Wilson; November 5, 1862; Louisville, Kentucky, U.S.
- Education: Wellesley College
- Occupation: journalist
- Spouse: Robert Bruce James (m. 1889)
- Writing career
- Language: English
- Subject: horses

Annie Laurie Wilson James (born November 5, 1862) was an American journalist. Among other work, she focused on the compilation of horse pedigrees and heredity problems in horses. She was the assistant editor and manager of Breeder and Sportsman, published in San Francisco, California.

== Personal life and education ==
Annie Laurie Wilson was born in Louisville, Kentucky, on November 5, 1862. She was a daughter of William Henry Wilson, for many years a breeder of trotting horses, residing in Abdallah Park, Cynthiana, Kentucky. Her mother was Miss Annie Eliza Cook, a Pennsylvanian by birth and a Virginian by residence.

Wilson attended the public school in Cynthiana, graduating in 1879. In the fall of that year, she entered the freshman class in Wellesley College, Wellesley, Massachusetts. During five years, she pursued her studies in that institution, her health not permitting continuous study, although vigorous when not confined to the schoolroom. In January, 1884, she was forced by illness to leave the college. Again in Kentucky, she soon recovered and was eagerly looking forward to the resumption of her studies in the fall of that year.

== Career ==
In August 1884, her father was ruined by a fire, in which he lost US$100,000. Wilson decided to support herself and became a teacher at Cynthiana high school. She divided the teaching of the four-year course with the principal. She taught French, German, Latin, arithmetic, algebra, geometry, trigonometry, English and history. While teaching she assisted her father in arranging his papers after the fire. She also helped with his correspondence. In this way, she became a most invaluable and trustworthy confidential clerk to him.

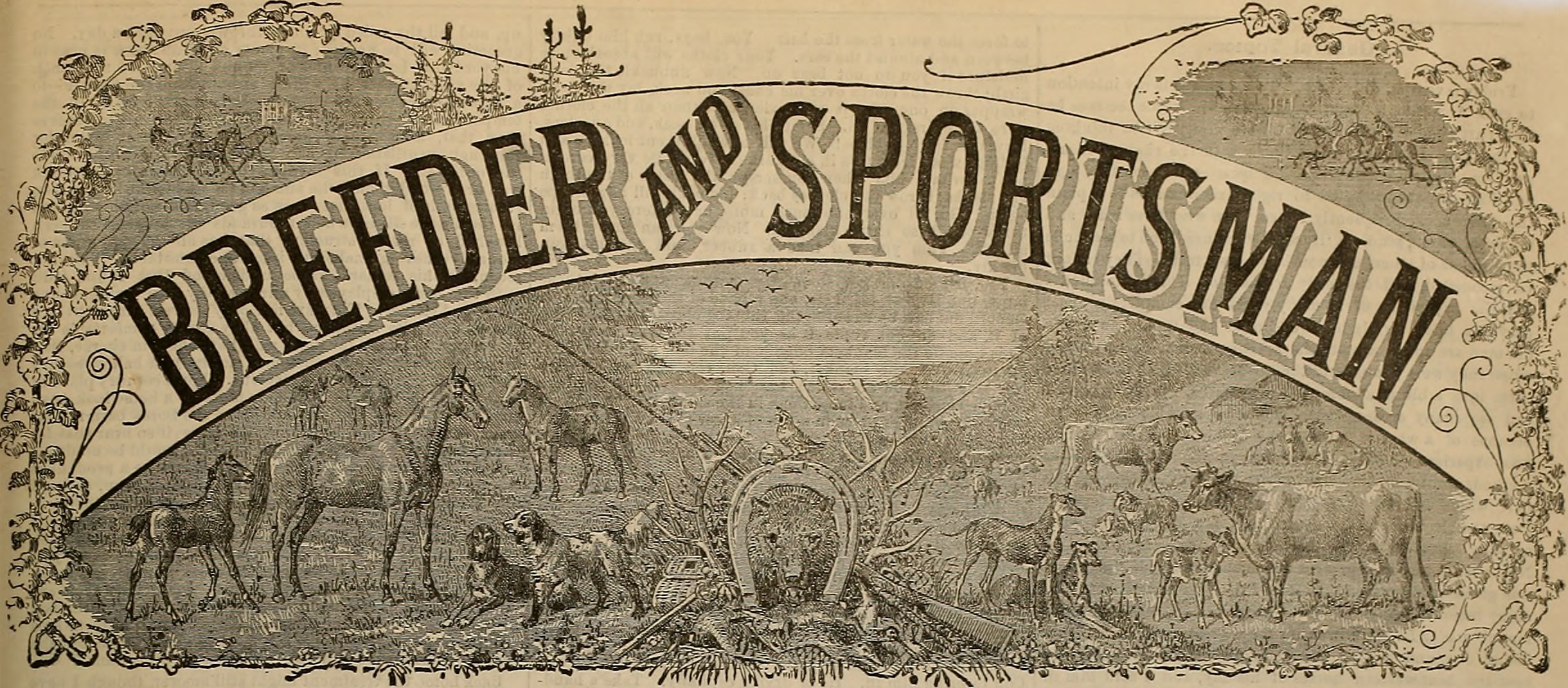
"Breeder and Sportsman" (1888)

In 1886, she resigned her position in the Cynthiana school and devoted herself entirely to the work of her father's office. She continued to carry on his work until 1888, when he sent her to California on a business trip. While she was in San Francisco, she formed the acquaintance of the owners of the "Breeder and Sportsman," and they offered her a lucrative position as assistant editor and business manager of that journal. She accepted their offer.

Among other work, she compiled horse pedigrees, in which statistics play a prominent part. Aside from that, she was a student of the problems of heredity in horses. She was a fluent, direct and luminous writer, and her position as an authority on the horse was unique.

== Personal life ==
On 19 January 1889, she married Robert Bruce James. Alter their marriage, they lived for a time on their farm near Gilroy, California. They next removed to their ranch near Baker City, Oregon. A son, Oscar William James, was born on 6 November 1889.

From early childhood, James was a member of the Episcopal Church. She was a devoted Sunday-school worker. While yet in Wellesley College, she became a member of the Woman's Christian Temperance Union. Wherever she lived, she was affiliated, if practicable, with the missionary society. She was one of the charter-members of the Cynthiana Library Association, which founded a valuable public library in that town. In Wellesley College, she was a member of Phi Sigma.
