= Royal Swedish Academy of Sciences =

Sweden's national academy of sciences

The Royal Swedish Academy of Sciences
- Kungliga Vetenskapsakademien

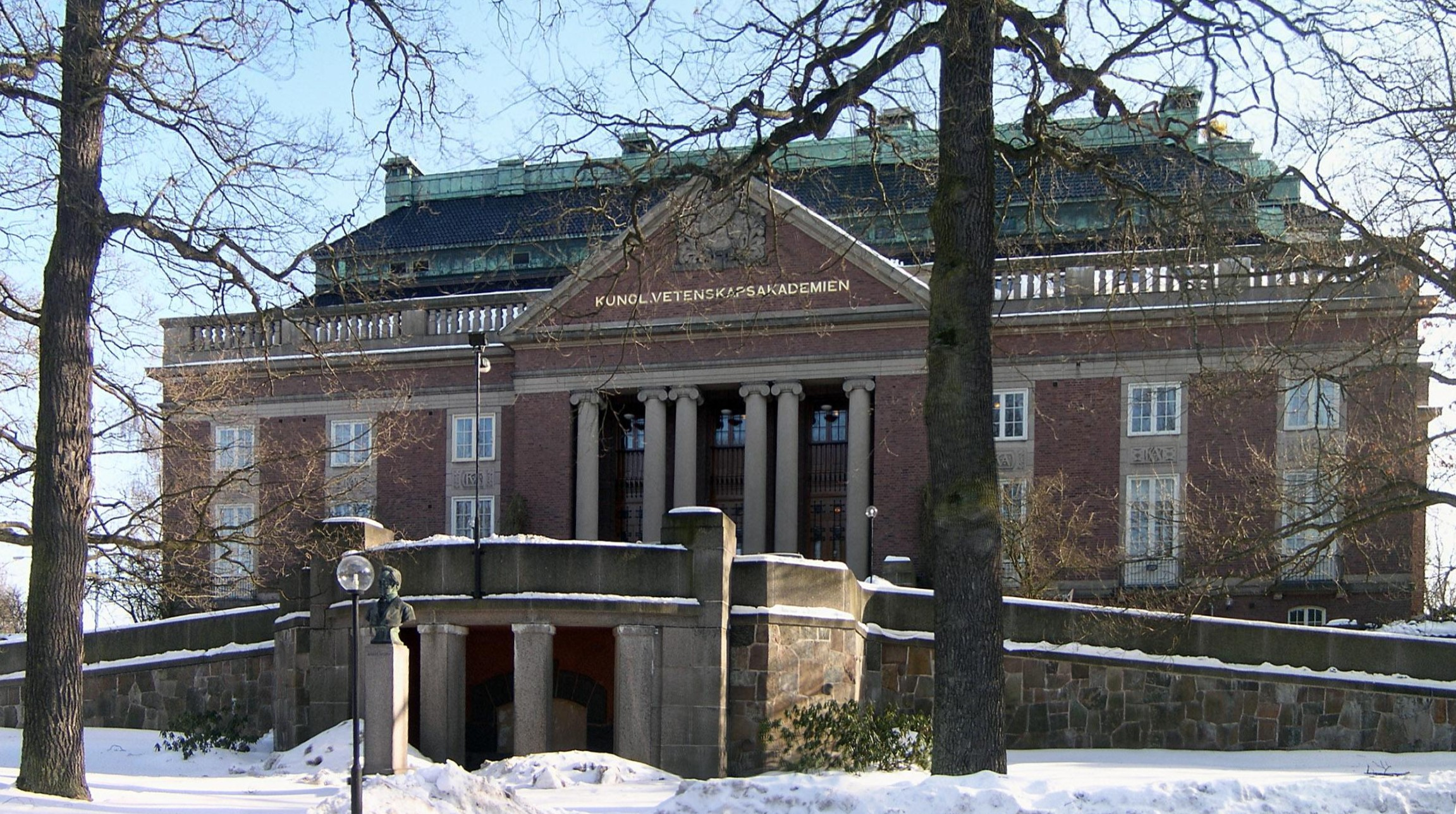
- Main building of the Royal Swedish Academy of Sciences in Stockholm
- Formation: 2 June 1739; 287 years ago
- Headquarters: Stockholm, Sweden
- Coordinates: 59°21′59″N 18°3′6″E
- Members: 470 Members (including 175 Foreign members)
- President: Sven Lidin
- Secretary General: Ellen Moons
- Website: www.kva.se

The Royal Swedish Academy of Sciences (Swedish: Kungliga Vetenskapsakademien) is one of the royal academies of Sweden. Founded on 2 June 1739, it is an independent, non-governmental scientific organization that takes special responsibility for promoting natural sciences and mathematics and strengthening their influence in society, whilst endeavouring to promote the exchange of ideas between various disciplines.

The goals of the academy are:

- To be a forum where researchers meet across subject boundaries,
- To offer a unique environment for research,
- To provide support to younger researchers,
- To reward outstanding research efforts,
- To communicate internationally among scientists,
- To advance the case for science within society and to influence research policy priorities
- To stimulate interest in mathematics and science in school, and
- To disseminate and popularize scientific information in various forms.

Every year, the academy awards the Nobel Prizes in physics and chemistry, the Sveriges Riksbank Prize in Economic Sciences in Memory of Alfred Nobel, the Crafoord Prize, the Sjöberg Prize and several other awards. The academy maintains close relations with foreign academies, learned societies and international scientific organizations and also promotes international scientific cooperation. The Academy of Sciences is located within the Stockholm region's Royal National City Park.

== Prizes ==
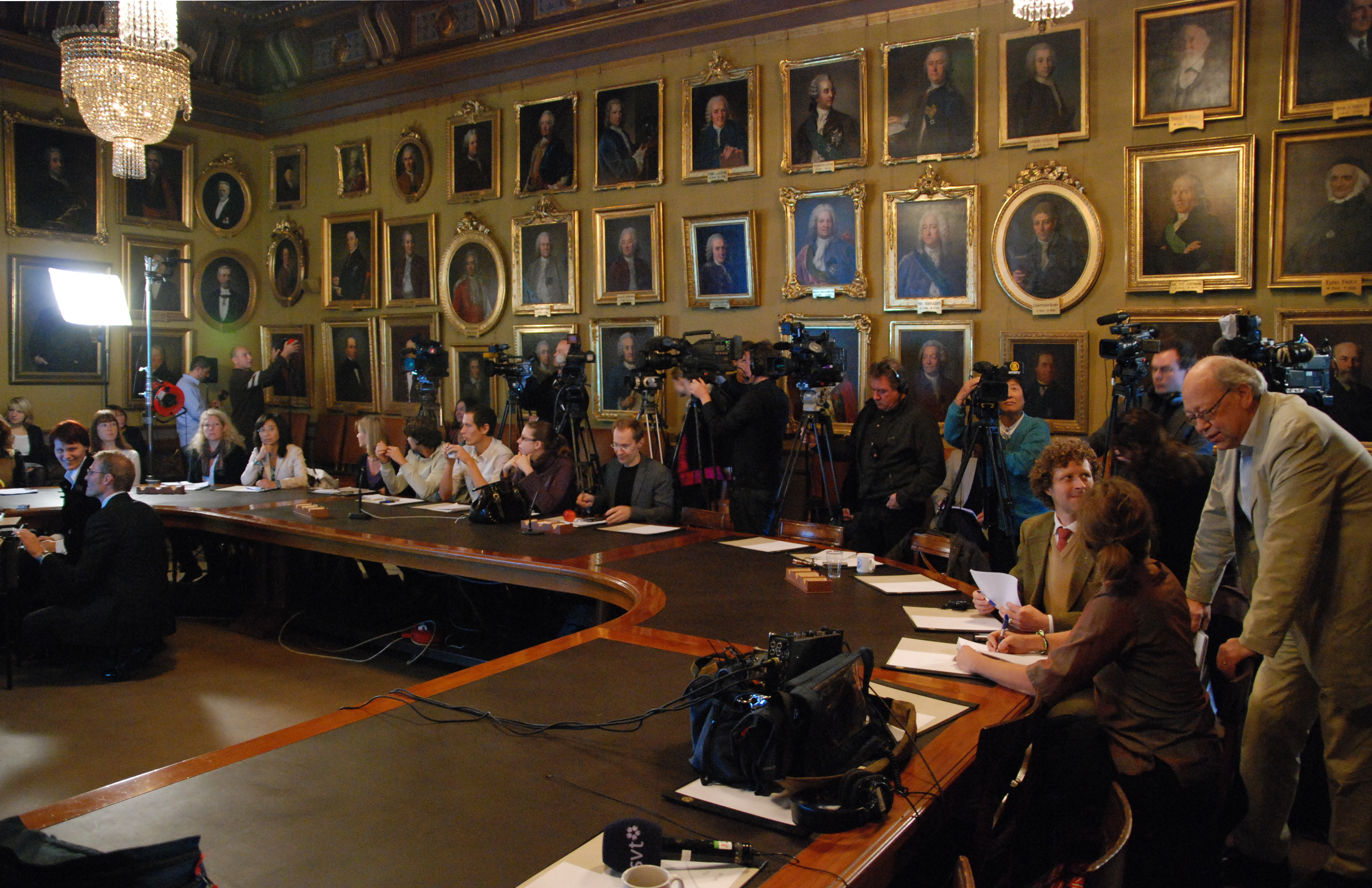
Nobel Chemistry Prize, news conference (2008)

=== Notable international prizes ===
- Nobel Prizes in Physics and in Chemistry
- Sveriges Riksbank Prize in Economic Sciences in Memory of Alfred Nobel
- Crafoord Prizes in astronomy and mathematics, geosciences, biosciences (with an emphasis on ecology), and polyarthritis (for example rheumatoid arthritis)
- Sjöberg Prize for research in cancer
- Rolf Schock Prizes in logic and philosophy, mathematics, visual arts and musical arts
- Gregori Aminoff Prize in crystallography
- Gold Medal for Radiation Protection
- Linnaeus Medals for highly accomplished Swedish (gold medals) or foreign (silver medals) researchers.

=== Notable national prizes ===
- Göran Gustafsson Prize for research in chemistry, mathematics, molecular biology, medicine and physics
- Ingvar Lindqvist Prizes for teachers in the fields of physics, chemistry, biology, mathematics and natural sciences
- Tage Erlander Prize "for research in natural sciences and technology" in four fields (physics, chemistry, technology and biology)

== Members ==
The academy has elected about 1,700 Swedish and 1,200 foreign members since it was founded in 1739. Today, the academy has about 480 Swedish and 175 foreign members which are divided into ten "classes", representing ten various scientific disciplines:

- Mathematics
- Astronomy and space science
- Physics
- Chemistry
- Geosciences
- Biosciences
- Medical sciences
- Engineering sciences
- Social sciences
- Humanities and "for outstanding services to science"

== List of secretaries general ==
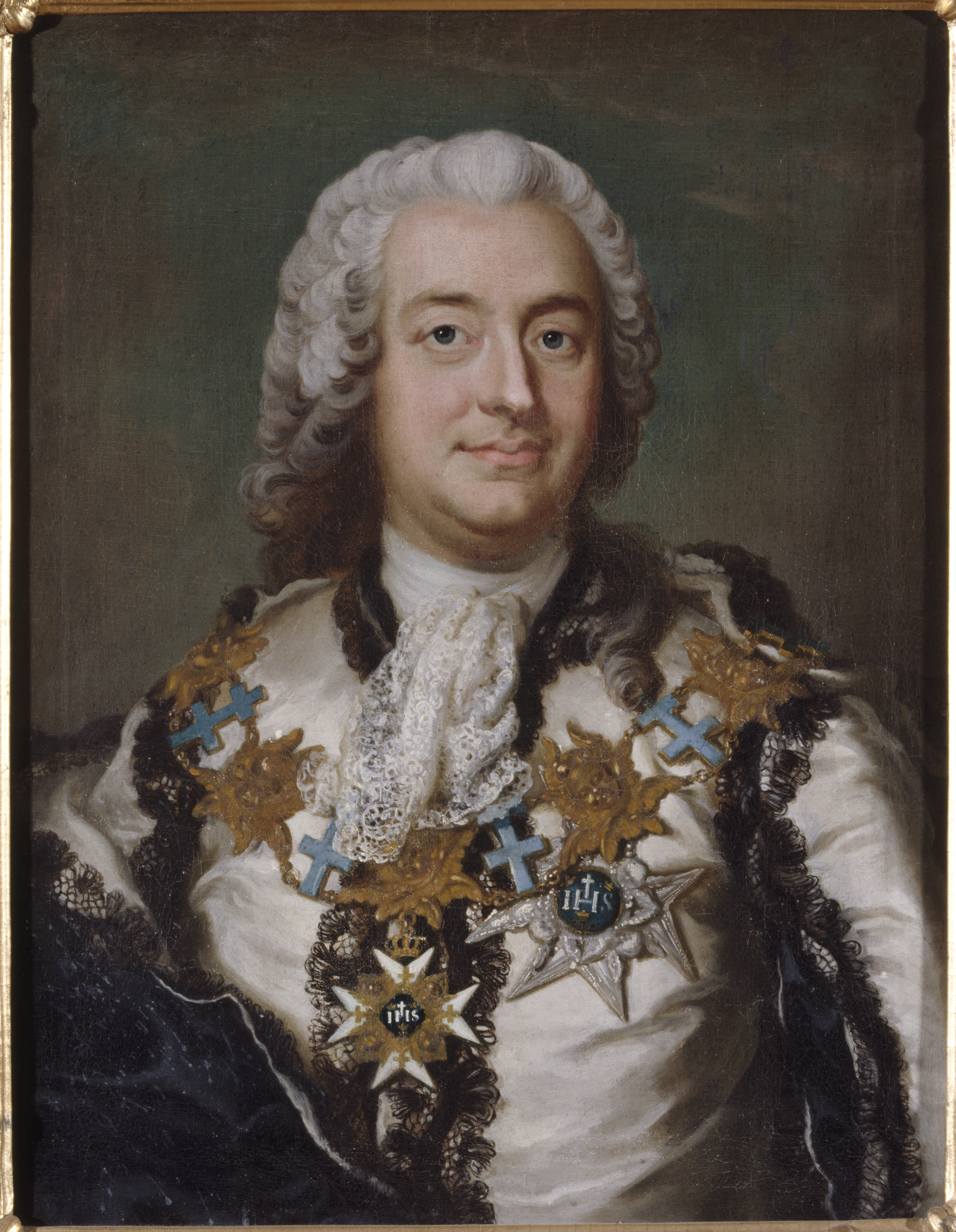
Anders Johan von Höpken, the first Secretary

The following persons have served as permanent secretaries of the academy:

- Anders Johan von Höpken, 1739–1740, 1740–1741
- Augustin Ehrensvärd, April – June 1740
- Jacob Faggot, 1741–1744
- Pehr Elvius, 1744–1749
- Pehr Wilhelm Wargentin, 1749–1783
- Johan Carl Wilcke and Henrik Nicander, 1784–1796
- Daniel Melanderhjelm and Henrik Nicander, 1796–1803
- Jöns Svanberg and Carl Gustaf Sjöstén 1803–1808; Sjöstén was removed 1808 for negligence of his duties
- Jöns Svanberg, 1809–1811
- Olof Swartz, 1811–1818
- Jöns Jacob Berzelius, 1818–1848
- Peter Fredrik Wahlberg, 1848–1866
- Georg Lindhagen, 1866–1901
- Christopher Aurivillius, 1901–1923
- Henrik Gustaf Söderbaum, 1923–1933
- Henning Pleijel, 1933–1943
- Arne Westgren, 1943–1959
- Erik Rudberg, 1959–1972
- Carl Gustaf Bernhard, 1973–1980
- Tord Ganelius, 1981–1989
- Carl-Olof Jacobson, 1989–1997
- Erling Norrby, 1997 – 30 June 2003
- Gunnar Öquist, 1 July 2003 – 30 June 2010
- Staffan Normark, 1 July 2010 – 30 June 2015
- Göran K. Hansson, 1 July 2015 – 31 December 2021
- Hans Ellegren, 1 January 2022 – 31 December 2025
- Ellen Moons, 1 January 2026 – present

== Publications ==
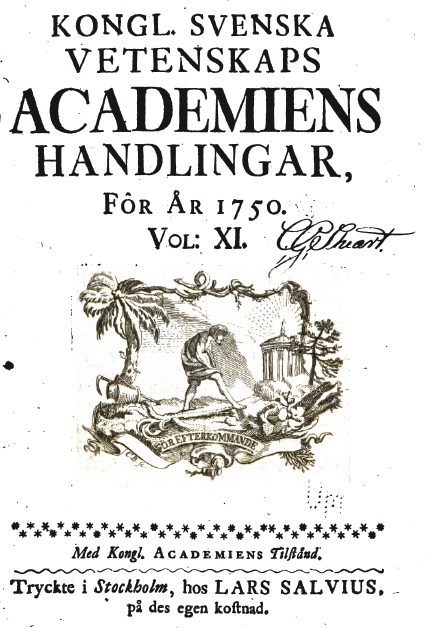
Kongl. Svenska Vetenskaps-Academiens handlingar, volume XI (1750)

The transactions of the academy (Vetenskapsakademiens handlingar) were published as its main series between 1739 and 1974. In parallel, other major series have appeared and gone:

- Öfversigt af Kungl. Vetenskapsakademiens förhandlingar (1844–1903)
- Bihang till Vetenskapsakademiens Handlingar (1872–1902)
- Vetenskapsakademiens årsbok (1903–1969)

The academy started publishing annual reports in physics and chemistry (1826), technology (1827), botany (1831), and zoology (1832). These lasted into the 1860s, when they were replaced by the single Bihang series (meaning: supplement to the transactions). Starting in 1887, this series was once again split into four sections (afdelning), which in 1903, became independent scientific journals of their own, titled "Arkiv för..." (archive for...). These included:

- Arkiv för botanik (1903–1974)
- Arkiv för kemi, mineralogi och geologi (1903–1949)
- Arkiv för matematik, astronomi och fysik (1903–1949)
- Arkiv för Zoologi (1903–1974)

Further restructuring of their topics occurred in 1949 and 1974. Other defunct journals of the academy include:

- Electronic Transactions on Artificial Intelligence (1997–2001)

=== Current publications ===
- Ambio (from 1972)
- Acta Mathematica (from 1882)
- Arkiv för Matematik (from 1949 with this title; 1903–1949 also including physics and astronomy)
- Acta Zoologica (from 1920)
- Levnadsteckningar över Vetenskapsakademiens ledamöter (from 1869), biographies of deceased members
- Porträttmatrikel (from 1971), portraits of current members
- Zoologica Scripta (from 1972), jointly with the Norwegian Academy of Science and Letters

== History ==
The academy was founded on 2 June 1739 by naturalist Carl Linnaeus, mercantilist Jonas Alströmer, mechanical engineer Mårten Triewald, civil servants Sten Carl Bielke and Carl Wilhelm Cederhielm, and statesman/author Anders Johan von Höpken.

The purpose of the academy was to focus on practically useful knowledge, and to publish in Swedish in order to widely disseminate the academy's findings. The academy was intended to be different from the Royal Society of Sciences in Uppsala, which had been founded in 1719 and published in Latin. The location close to the commercial activities in Sweden's capital (which unlike Uppsala did not have a university at this time) was also intentional. The academy was modeled after the Royal Society of London and Academie Royale des Sciences in Paris, France, which some of the founding members were familiar with.

== See also ==
- Members of the Royal Swedish Academy of Sciences
