= Acta Mathematica =

Peer-reviewed open-access journal

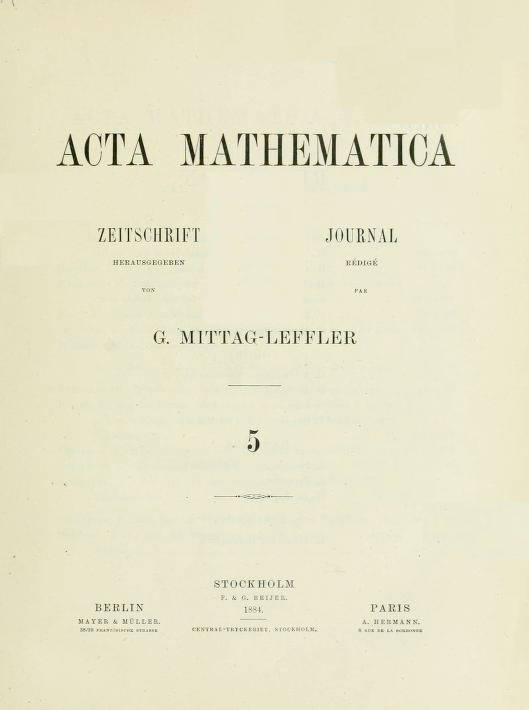
- Discipline: Mathematics
- Language: English, French, German
- Edited by: Tobias Ekholm

Publication details
- History: 1882–present
- Publisher: International Press on behalf of Mittag-Leffler Institute
- Frequency: Quarterly
- Open access: Yes
- Impact factor: 4.273 (2020)

Standard abbreviations
- ISO 4: Acta Math.

Indexing
- CODEN: ACMAA8
- ISSN: 0001-5962 (print); 1871-2509 (web)
- LCCN: 15001937
- OCLC no.: 01460915

Links
- Journal homepage; Journal page at publisher's website; Online access

Acta Mathematica is a peer-reviewed open-access scientific journal covering research in all fields of mathematics.

According to Cédric Villani, this journal is "considered by many to be the most prestigious of all mathematical research journals". According to the Journal Citation Reports, the journal has a 2020 impact factor of 4.273, ranking it 5th out of 330 journals in the category "Mathematics".

== Publication history ==
The journal was established by Gösta Mittag-Leffler in 1882 and is published by Institut Mittag-Leffler, a research institute for mathematics belonging to the Royal Swedish Academy of Sciences. The journal was printed and distributed by Springer from 2006 to 2016. Since 2017, Acta Mathematica has been published electronically and in print by International Press. Its electronic version is open access without publishing fees.

== Poincaré episode ==
The journal's "most famous episode" (according to Villani) concerns Henri Poincaré, who won a prize offered in 1887 by Oscar II of Sweden for the best mathematical work concerning the stability of the Solar System by purporting to prove the stability of a special case of the three-body problem. This episode was rediscovered in the 1990s by Daniel Goroff, in his preface to the English translation of "Les méthodes nouvelles de la mécanique céleste" by June Barrow-Green and K.G. Andersson. The prized or lauded paper was to be published in Acta Mathematica, but after the issue containing the paper was printed, Poincaré found an error that invalidated his proof. He paid more than the prize money to destroy the print run and reprint the issue without his paper and instead published a corrected paper a year later in the same journal that demonstrated that the system could be unstable. This paper later became one of the foundational works of chaos theory.

== Literature ==
- Gårding, Lars (1998). Mathematics and Mathematicians. American Mathematical Society. ISBN 9780821890455.
