= Eva Åkesson =

Swedish chemist

Eva Barbro Helen Åkesson
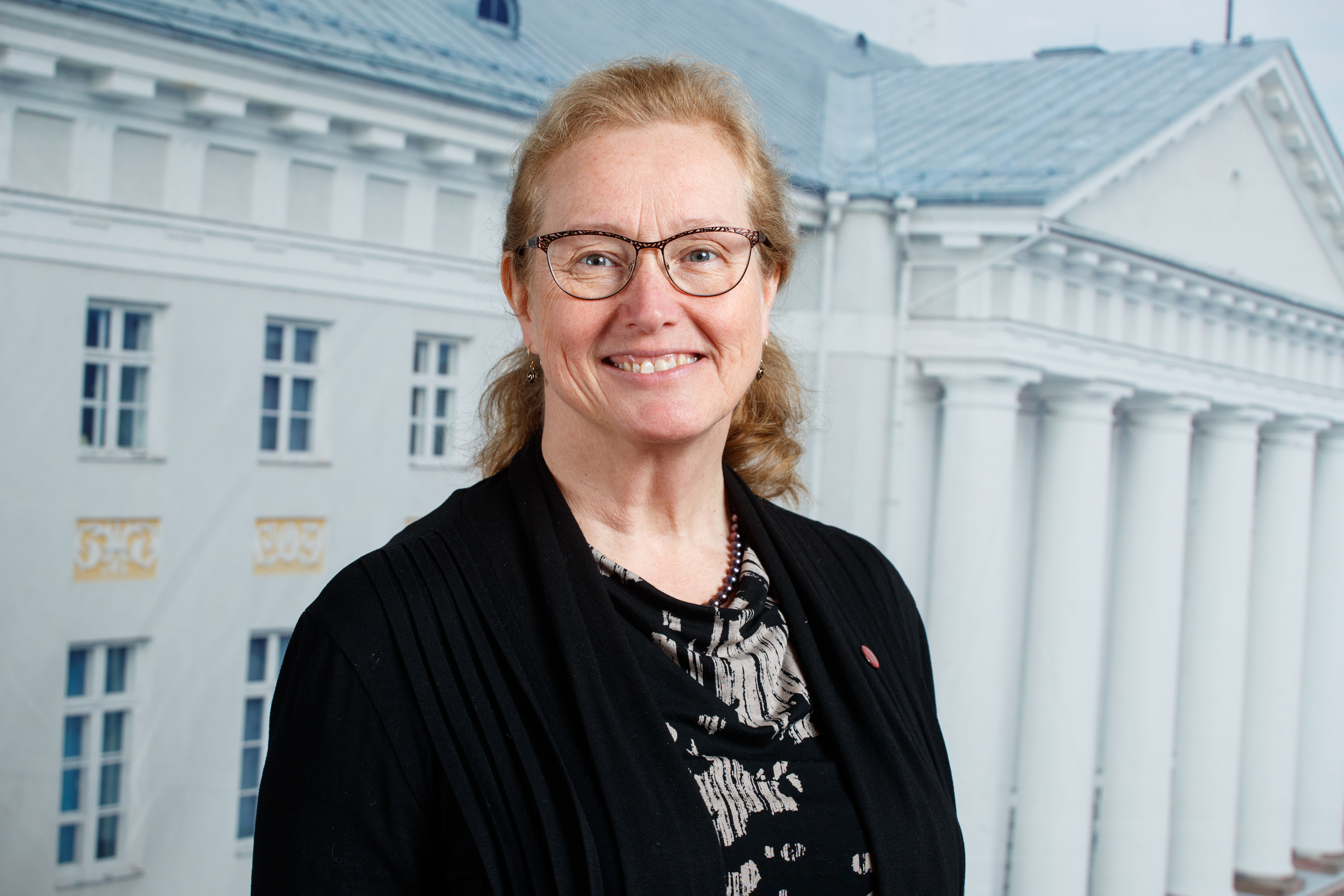
- Eva Åkesson in Tartu
- Born: December 30, 1961 (age 64); Ängelholm
- Occupation: professor of chemical physics
- Known for: Rector of Uppsala University 2012–2020

Eva Barbro Helen Åkesson (born 30 December 1961 in Ängelholm) is a Swedish professor of chemical physics who was the Rector of Uppsala University 2012–2020. She was previously Pro-Rector of Lund University.

== Career ==
After taking the social sciences programme at Ängelholm Upper Secondary School, Åkesson studied chemistry at Umeå University, completing her doctorate in physical chemistry in 1989. She had a research position (postdoctoral) at the University of Minnesota in the US from 1989 to 1991 and was subsequently employed at Umeå University. She joined the faculty of Lund University as a researcher and teacher in 1996, later serving as director of studies in chemistry. In 2003, Rector Göran Bexell appointed her to one of the two newly established positions as Vice-Rector at Lund University, with special responsibility for undergraduate studies.

In 2008 she was invited to apply for the position of Rector, to succeed Bexell. Although Per Eriksson was appointed as Rector, the university board made it clear at an early stage that it wished to see Åkesson as Pro-Rector of the university, and she was formally appointed to this position on 15 December 2008. She was Pro-Rector 2009–2011.

In 2011 she became Professor of chemical physics at Lund University.

On 11 October 2011, the University Board of Uppsala University proposed Eva Åkesson as the new Rector (formally known as Rectrix Magnifica). The government decided on 24 November 2011 to appoint her Rector from 1 January 2012, succeeding Anders Hallberg. The inauguration was held on 16 December 2011. She was the first woman to become Rector of Uppsala University.

In February 2014, eight deans (faculty heads) and three vice-rectors (who head the university's Disciplinary Domains) at Uppsala university demanded that Åkesson leave her position, with allegations of a poor leadership style on her part. The university board (consistory) gave Åkesson their vote of confidence and she remained, while the three vice-rectors left their positions. A year later, Åkesson commented on the leadership crisis, saying that she could have prepared herself better for her position as Rector.

In 2015, Åkesson was appointed an honorary doctor at the University of Edinburgh with the motivation: 'in recognition of your outstanding contributions to Sweden's higher education and internationalization.' On October 5, 2017, the University Board (Uppsala University's board) unanimously decided to follow the recruitment group and the hearing assembly's recommendation to propose to the government to renew Åkesson's mandate as rector for another term from January 1, 2018, to December 31, 2020. On January 1, 2021, she returned to her previous position at Lund University.

=== Other Assignments ===
- Member of the Royal Scientific Society in Uppsala (KVSU) 2011
- Chair of the expert panel for the evaluation of leadership and governance at the University of Helsinki in 2008 and Aalto School of Science in 2011.
- Member of the Swedish Institute's transparency council 2011–2019
- Inspector of Europaskolan Strängnäs 2014–
- Member of the Scientific Advisory Board, University of Tübingen 2015–
- Chair of the Matariki Network of Universities 2015–2017 (Vice Chair 2014–2015)
- Chair of Sanord 2017–2018 (Vice Chair 2014–2016)
- Member of the University of Tartu Council 2017–2022
- Vice Chair of The Guild of European Research Intensive Universities 2017–2020
- Member of the International Advisory Board, University of Helsinki 2020–
- She has served as secretary and vice chair for the International Union of Pure and Applied Chemistry's (IUPAC) Committee on Chemistry Education.

=== Honors ===
- Honorary member of Uplands Nation, 2012
- Rotary Östra Uppsala, honorary member, 2014
- Lund Natural Science Student Union, honorary member, 2014
- Honorary curator, Lund nations, 2014
- Honorary doctorate from the University of Edinburgh, June 2015
- H.M. The King's Medal of the 12th size in the Order of the Seraphim for "meritorious contributions to Swedish higher education," 2018
- University of Tartu's Johan Skytte Medal, 2019

== Personal life ==
She is the daughter of Mikko Åkesson and Barbro Lundegård and was formerly married to Henrik Hedman, an upper secondary school teacher. She lives in Uppsala.

Academic offices
Preceded by Ann Numhauser-Henning	Pro-Rector of Lund University; 2009–2011	Succeeded by Eva Wiberg
Preceded by Anders Hallberg	Rector of Uppsala University; 1 January 2012 – 31 December 2020	Succeeded by Anders Hagfeldt
