= Hagfeldt =

Hagfeldt is a surname. Notable people with the surname include:

- Anders Hagfeldt (born 1964), Swedish material scientist
- Stefan Hagfeldt (born 1944), Swedish politician
