= Per Eriksson =

Per Eriksson may refer to:

- Per Eriksson (professor) (born 1949), Swedish signal processing scientist
- Per Thomas Eriksson (born 1963), Swedish Olympic athlete, son of Per Eriksson (decathlete)
- Per Eriksson (musician) (born 1982), Swedish heavy metal guitarist
- Per Axel Eriksson (1925–2016), Swedish decathlete

== See also ==
- Pär Ericsson (born 1988), Swedish footballer
