= Jonas Bergquist =

Swedish chemist, neuroscientist and academic (born 1966)

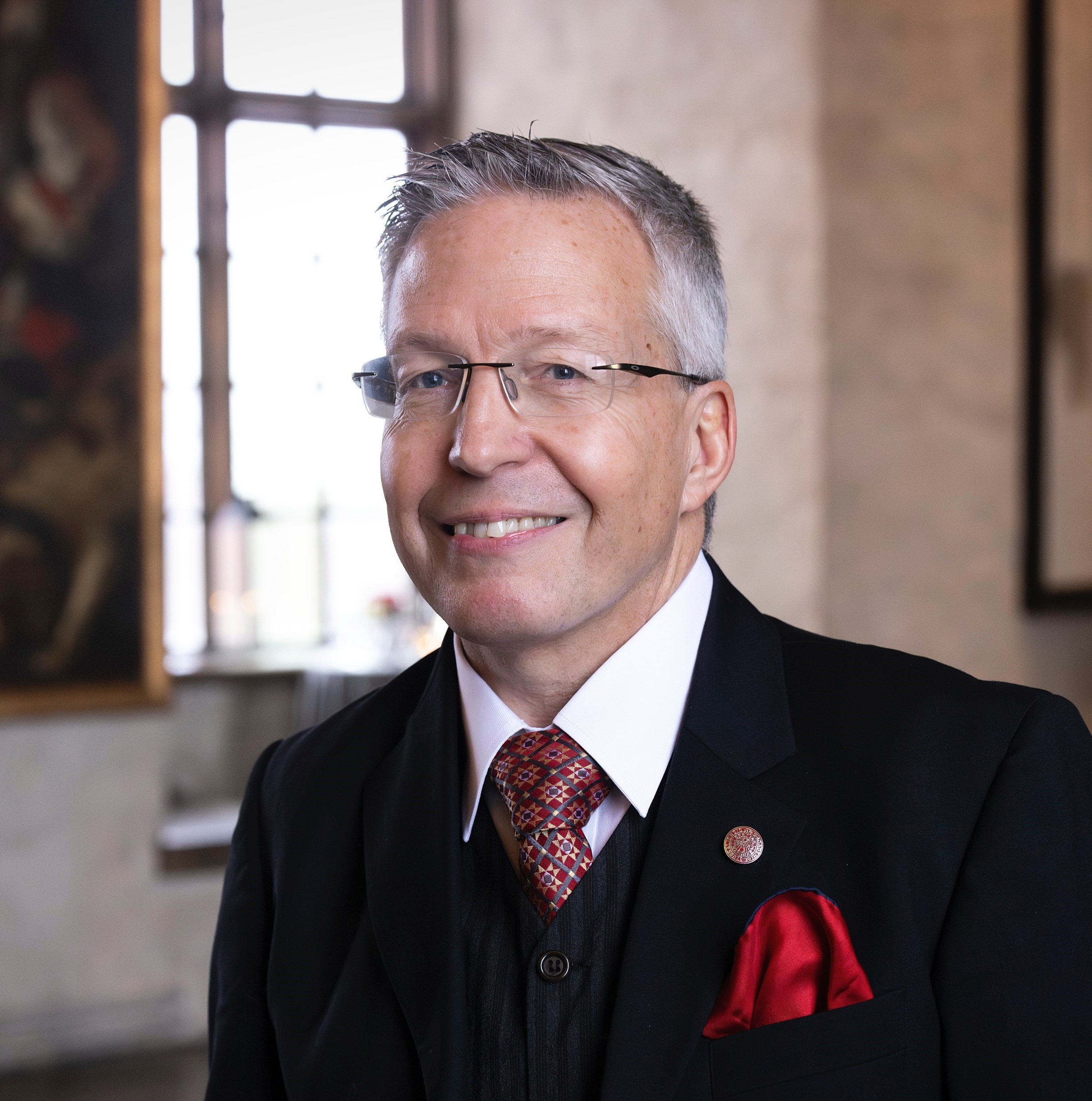
- Bergquist in 2024
- Born: 1966 (age 59–60)
- Education: Lund University; University of Gothenburg
- Known for: ME/CFS
- Awards: Arrhenius Plaque (2009); The Qilu Friendship Award (2019)
- Scientific career
- Fields: Analytical chemistry Neurochemistry
- Workplaces: Uppsala University; Binzhou Medical University; University of Utah
- Website: www.uu.se/en/contact-and-organisation/staff?query=N99-791

Jonas Bergquist (born 1966) is a Swedish analytical chemist and clinical neuroscientist, professor and inspector equitandi at Uppsala University, distinguished professor in precision medicine at Binzhou Medical University and adjunct professor of pathology at University of Utah.

== Biography ==
Born 1966, Bergquist was educated at Lund University and University of Gothenburg from which he received his MD PhD in 1996. He was appointed professor of Analytical Chemistry in Uppsala in 2005. He is a fellow of the Royal Society of Chemistry (FRSC), fellow and general secretary of Royal Society of Sciences in Uppsala, fellow of the Royal Swedish Academy of Engineering Sciences, Chair of the Swedish Society for Mass Spectrometry and the Chemical Society in Uppsala.

In addition to research in analytical chemistry, proteomics and mass spectrometry, he is known for his work in myalgic encephalomyelitis/chronic fatigue syndrome.

Academic offices
