= Belén Martín-Matute =

Spanish-Swedish chemist

- Born: Madrid, Spain
- Education: Autonomous University of Madrid
- Known for: Sustainable catalysis, C–H functionalisation, hybrid catalysis
- Awards: Arrhenius Plaque (2024); Göran Gustafsson Prize (2018)
- Scientific career
- Fields: Organic chemistry
- Workplaces: Stockholm University
- Doctoral advisor: A. M. Echavarren

Belén Martín-Matute is a Spanish-Swedish chemist and professor of organic chemistry at Stockholm University. Her research focuses on sustainable catalysis, including the development of catalytic methods combining transition metal catalysis, organocatalysis, and biocatalysis for environmentally friendly chemical synthesis.

She was elected a member of the Royal Swedish Academy of Sciences in 2023 and is a recipient of several major scientific awards, including the Arrhenius Plaque and the Göran Gustafsson Prize in Chemistry.

== Early life and education ==
Martín-Matute was born in Madrid, Spain. She obtained her Licenciate degree in organic chemistry from the Autonomous University of Madrid in 1998 and completed her PhD in 2002 under the supervision of A. M. Echavarren.

== Career ==
Following her doctoral studies, Martín-Matute conducted postdoctoral research at Stockholm University with Jan-E. Bäckvall, where she worked on dynamic kinetic resolution using combined metal and enzyme catalysis. She later worked in Spain with José C. Carretero on asymmetric catalysis.

She joined Stockholm University as assistant professor in 2007, became associate professor in 2012, and was appointed full professor in 2014.

== Research ==
Martín-Matute's research focuses on catalytic methods for forming carbon–carbon and carbon–heteroatom bonds, with emphasis on sustainability, atom economy, and environmentally benign processes.

Her work spans:

- Transition metal catalysis
- Organocatalysis and biocatalysis
- C–H functionalisation and late-stage functionalisation
- Heterogeneous catalysis using metal–organic frameworks (MOFs)
- Catalytic transformation of renewable resources such as carbon dioxide

Her research has contributed to the development of integrated catalytic strategies, particularly combining enzymatic and metal catalysis to enable efficient and selective transformations.

== Recognition and impact ==
Martín-Matute's research focuses on the development of sustainable catalytic processes for chemical synthesis, including the use of renewable resources such as water and carbon dioxide as raw materials. According to the Knut and Alice Wallenberg Foundation, her work aims to enable the production of valuable chemicals while avoiding hazardous intermediates and reducing environmental impact.

She has contributed to international research efforts addressing the development of safe and sustainable chemical systems, including collaborative work published in journals of the Nature Portfolio.

She was awarded the Ulla and Stig Holmquist Science Prize in Organic Chemistry in 2023. According to the award motivation, her work represents the "pioneering development of new reagents and reactions in organic chemistry" and has had "great influence on central parts of organic chemistry".

== Scientific leadership ==
Martín-Matute has served as associate editor of Organic Letters since 2021 and has held advisory roles in several international scientific journals.

== Awards and honours ==
- Arrhenius Plaque (2024), awarded by the Swedish Chemical Society
- Member of the Royal Swedish Academy of Sciences (2023)
- Ulla and Stig Holmquist Science Prize in Organic Chemistry (2023)
- Göran Gustafsson Prize in Chemistry (2018)

== Selected publications ==
Martín-Matute has authored numerous peer-reviewed publications in leading journals in organic chemistry and catalysis.
