= Arrhenius Plaque =

Annual award

The Arrhenius Plaque (Swedish: Arrhenius-plaketten) is awarded annually by the Swedish Chemical Society in memory of Svante Arrhenius, a Swedish physicist, chemist, and long-time member of the society, "to a person or persons who have distinguished themselves through outstanding research in the field of chemistry or who have performed valuable work for the good of the Swedish Chemical Society".

Past recipients include Ragnar Ryhage (1962), Jerker Porath and Per Flodin (1963), Carl-Ivar Brändén (1976), Svante Wold (1984), Gunnar von Heijne (1997), Per Claesson (2008), Jonas Bergquist (2009), Lisbeth Olsson (2018), Berit Olofsson (2021), Belén Martín-Matute (2024) and Karin Schillén (2025).
