= Anders Hallberg =

Swedish chemist (born 1945)

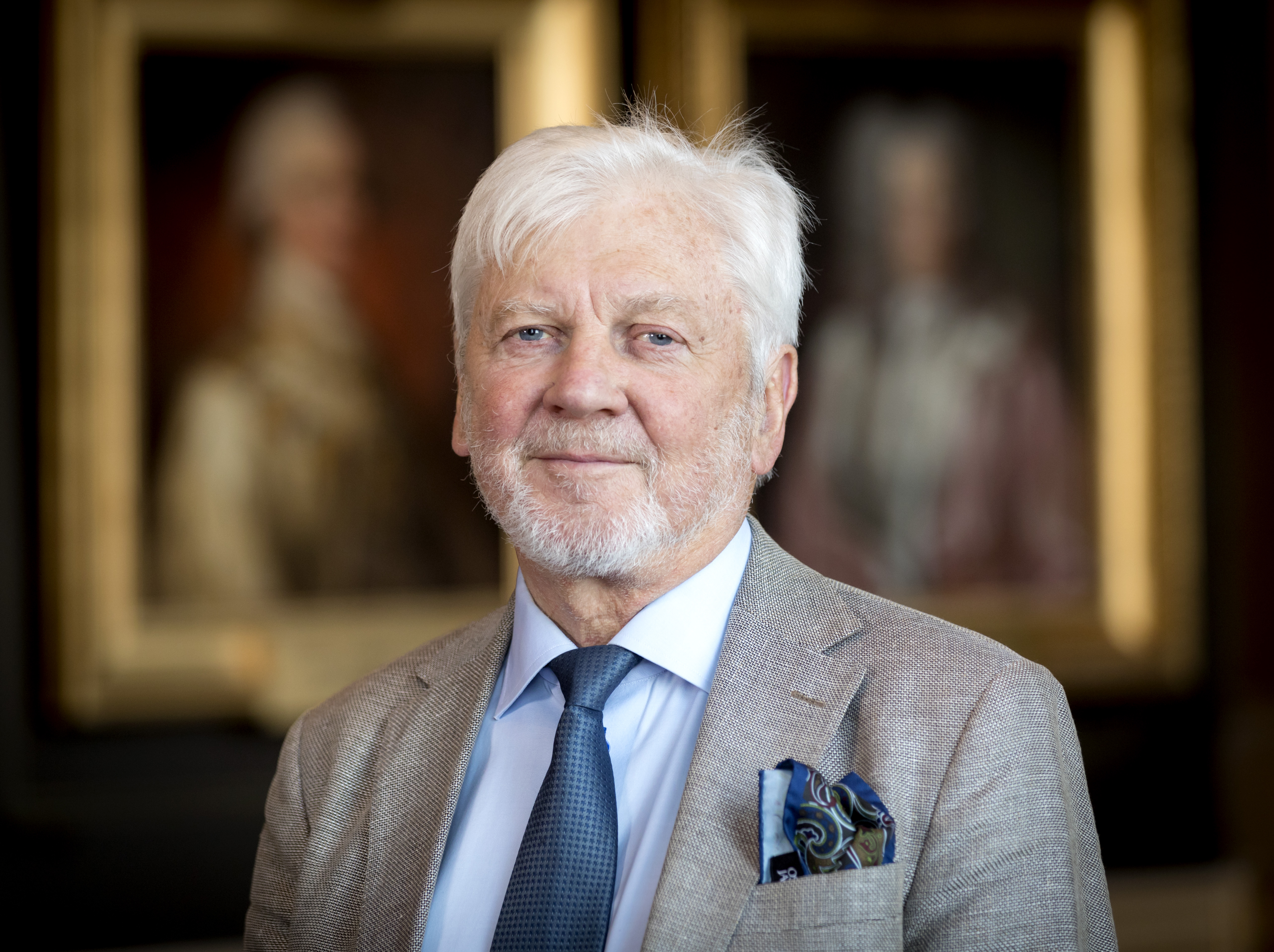
Anders Hallberg

Anders Hallberg (born 29 April 1945 in Vetlanda, Jönköping County (Småland) is a Swedish pharmaceutical researcher, professor in medicinal chemistry and 2006–2011 Rector Magnificus and Vice Chancellor at Uppsala University.

== Biography ==
Hallberg completed his basic education at Lund University, where he obtained a Master of Science (MSc) in chemistry and physics in 1969. The following year he attended the School of Education in Malmö obtained a BScEd and worked thereafter as a teacher in the junior high school from 1970 to 1973.

Hallberg returned to Lund University and the Chemical Centre, to conduct research in 1973–1979. In January 1980, he received a Doctor of Philosophy (PhD) in organic chemistry with the thesis "Methoxythiophenes and Related Systems". After six months as a researcher at Nobel Chemistry in Karlskoga, he completed the post-doctoral period at the University of Arizona, Tucson, Arizona, where he then was promoted to a position as assistant professor at the College of Pharmacy in 1981–1982. On his return to the Chemical Centre in Lund in 1983, he was appointed associate professor (docent).

He received grants from the Swedish Research Council and stayed at Lund University until 1986, when he took up a managerial position within the pharmaceutical company AstraDraco in Lund. Eventually he became Director and Head Medicinal Chemistry and only in 1990 did he leave the company to be installed as a professor of medicinal chemistry at Uppsala University. During the twenty years that followed, he worked at the Uppsala Biomedical Center (BMC), but kept in touch with his old company, now Astra Zeneca, through an assignment as a research advisor.

One year after arriving at Uppsala, in 1991, Hallberg became Chairman of the Department of Organic Pharmaceutical Chemistry and from 1992 to 1996 he acted as Dean for Research at the Faculty of Pharmacy. He served for many years as Chairman of the Evaluation Panel for Chemistry at The Swedish Research Council in Stockholm and as Chairman of the Medicinal Chemistry Section at The Swedish Academy of Pharmaceutical Sciences. During the period 2002–2005, he was Deputy Vice President (Medicine/Pharmacy), before taking over as Dean of the Faculty of Pharmacy in 2005. Hallberg was then elected Rector Magnificus (Vice Chancellor) for Uppsala University from 1 July 2006.

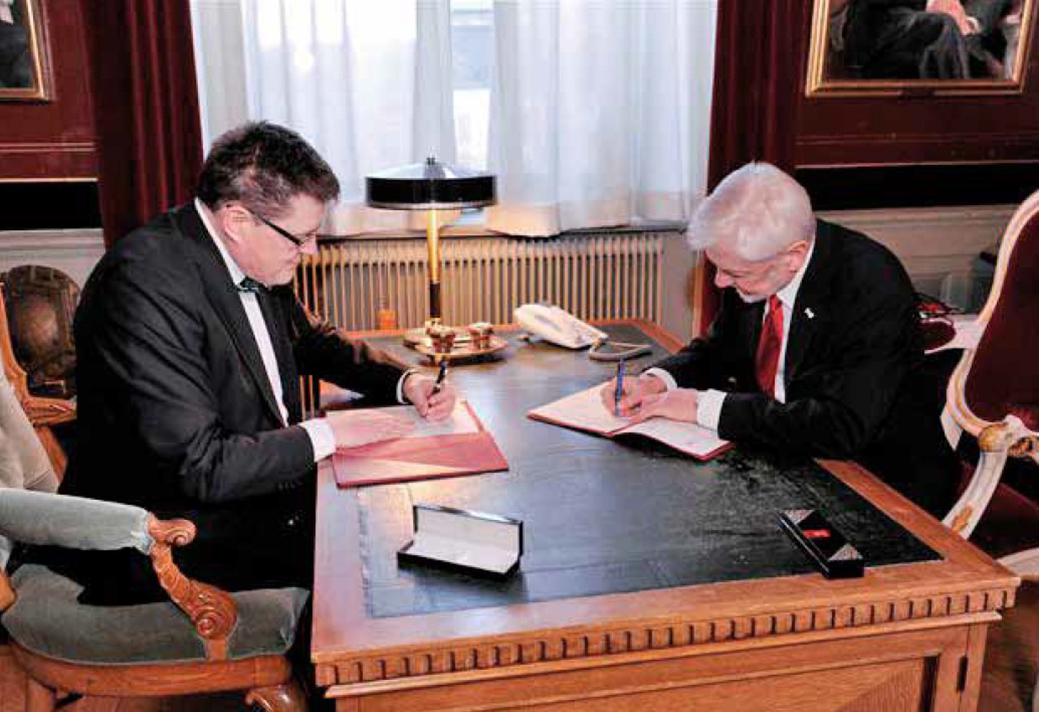
Anders Hallberg and Jörgen Tholin, then Vice Chancellor of the University of Gotland, signing the declaration of intent on the merger of Uppsala University and the University of Gotland.

As Vice Chancellor, Hallberg initiated Quality and Renewal (KoF07) in 2007, a comprehensive international evaluation of the university's research that was followed four years later by KoF11. In 2008, he took the initiative to Uppsala University's collaboration with the Royal Institute of Technology, Stockholm University and the Karolinska Institute with the aim to build the biomedical center formation Science for Life Laboratory (SciLifeLab). Hallberg was also one of the initiators to the collaborative organisation U4 Network, founded in 2008 and currently uniting a number of European universities, as well as the international Matariki Network of Universities (MNU), founded in 2010. In 2011, Hallberg and Jörgen Tholin, then Vice Chancellor of the University of Gotland, signed a declaration of intent on the merger of Uppsala University and the University of Gotland.

He was succeeded as Vice Chancellor on 1 January 2012 by Eva Åkesson.

== Research ==
Hallberg's research interests encompass a range of protein targets of pharmaceutical relevance, including proteases and G-protein coupled receptors (GPCRs). One of the primary themes has been to identify novel and selective low molecular weight ligands for these targets. Compounds are optimized using computer-aided techniques and are preferentially synthesized using high-speed chemistry and robust palladium-catalyzed C-C bond forming reactions partly developed in his laboratory. Major indications that have been addressed are malaria and viral infections caused by HIV and HCV (Hepatitis C Virus). More recently, the main focus of the Drug Discovery program was to identify novel ligands that interfere with protein targets in the renin/angiotensin system (RAS). The first reported drug-like selective and potent angiotensin II, type II receptor (AT2R) agonist (C21) was discovered by Hallberg’s group. Compound C21, (buloxibutid) now owned by Vicore Pharma AB (founded by AH et al.) has been extensively studied and is currently undergoing clinical evaluations (Phase II) with first indication idiopathic pulmonary fibrosis.

Hallberg has founded biotech companies, has > 40 patents and has authored >290 articles published in international scientific journals (number of citations >10 000). Hallberg has been the main supervisor for 29 doctoral students up to the doctoral degree. Member of several foundations, pharmaceutical company and university boards.

== Accolades ==
Hallberg is a member of the Royal Society of Sciences in Uppsala (1994), Royal Society of Arts and Sciences in Uppsala (2004), the Royal Physiographic Society in Lund (2005), the Royal Swedish Academy of Sciences (2006) and the Royal Academy of Engineering Sciences (2007).

In 2009 he was promoted to honorary doctor (Doctor honoris causa) of medicine at the Université de Sherbrooke, Canada and in 2014 to honorary doctor of pharmacy at Uppsala University. Since 2018, he is an honorary doctor of science and technology at Åbo Akademi University and in 2019 he became an honorary doctor of medicine at Hallym University, South Korea .

== Family ==
Hallberg is the son of forestry consultant Rudolf Hallberg and Anna-Lisa Hallberg, née Jonsson, and married to dentist Gunilla Hallberg, née Sartor. The son, Mathias Hallberg, is Professor of Molecular research on drug dependence and Dean of the Faculty of Pharmacy at Uppsala University.

== Honours and awards ==
Anders Hallberg has received several awards and prizes.

- The Fabian Gyllenberg Award from the Royal Physiographic Society in Lund, for best PhD thesis in chemistry (over a three-year period) at Lund University (1981)
- Senior Individual Grant Award to Outstanding Senior Scientist from Swedish Foundation for Strategic Research (SSF) (1998)
- First recipient of the National Swedish Prize in Organic Chemistry (The Holmquist Prize) (2004)
- The Oscar Carlsson Medal for Excellence from the Swedish Chemical Society (2005)
- The Best Teacher Prize 2006 from the Pharmacy Student Union, Uppsala University (2006)
- H. M. The King's Medal, 12th size with the ribbon of the Order of the Seraphim, for Distinguished Achievements in Education and Research (2008)
- The Order of the Cross of Terra Mariana from the President of Estonia (2011)
- The Gustav Adolf Medal (of the year 1924) from Uppsala University (2011)
- The Honorary Medal of the Uppsala County from the Governor (2011)
- The Rudbeck Medal for Outstanding Achievements in Science from Uppsala University (2013)

=== Honorary doctorates ===
- Doctor honoris causa (Medicine), Université de Sherbrooke, Canada (2009)
- Doctor honoris causa (Pharmacy), Uppsala University (2014)
- Doctor honoris causa (Science and Technology), Åbo Akademi University, Finland (2018)
- Doctor honoris causa (Medicine), Hallym University, South Korea (2019)

=== Membership of Royal Academies and Societies ===
- Member of the Royal Society of Sciences in Uppsala (Preses 2014–15) (1994–)
- Member of the Royal Society of Arts and Sciences in Uppsala (2004–)
- Member of the Royal Physiographic Society in Lund (2005–)
- Member of the Royal Swedish Academy of Sciences (KVA) Class IV, chemistry (2006–)
- Member of the Royal Swedish Academy of Engineering Sciences (IVA) Class IV, chemistry (2007–)
- Member of the Royal Patriotic Society (2009–)

=== Honorary memberships ===
- Honorary Member of the Småland Student Nation in Uppsala
- Honorary Member of the Upland Student Nation in Uppsala
- Honorary Member of the Gotland Student Nation in Uppsala
- Honorary Member of Allmänna Sången
- Honorary Member of Uppsala University Jazz Orchestra
- Honorary Member of Orphei Drängar (OD)
- Honorary Member of the Royal Academic Orchestra
- Honorary Member Rotary International

== Literature ==
Mattias Bolkéus Blom & Per Ström et al (eds.), Det goda universitetet: rektorsperioden 2006-2011. Festskrift till Anders Hallberg [The Good University The Vice-Chancellorship of 2006–2011. Festschrift to Anders Hallberg.] (Acta Universitatis Upsaliensis C:93, Uppsala 2011.

Fred Nyberg, "Anders Hallberg as a scientist", published in The Good University.

Kerstin Sahlin, "A rectorship with quality as a guiding light", published in The Good University.

Academic offices
Preceded by Bo Sundqvist	Rector of Uppsala University; 1 July 2006 – 31 December 2011	Succeeded by Eva Åkesson
