= Urmas Sutrop =

Estonian linguist

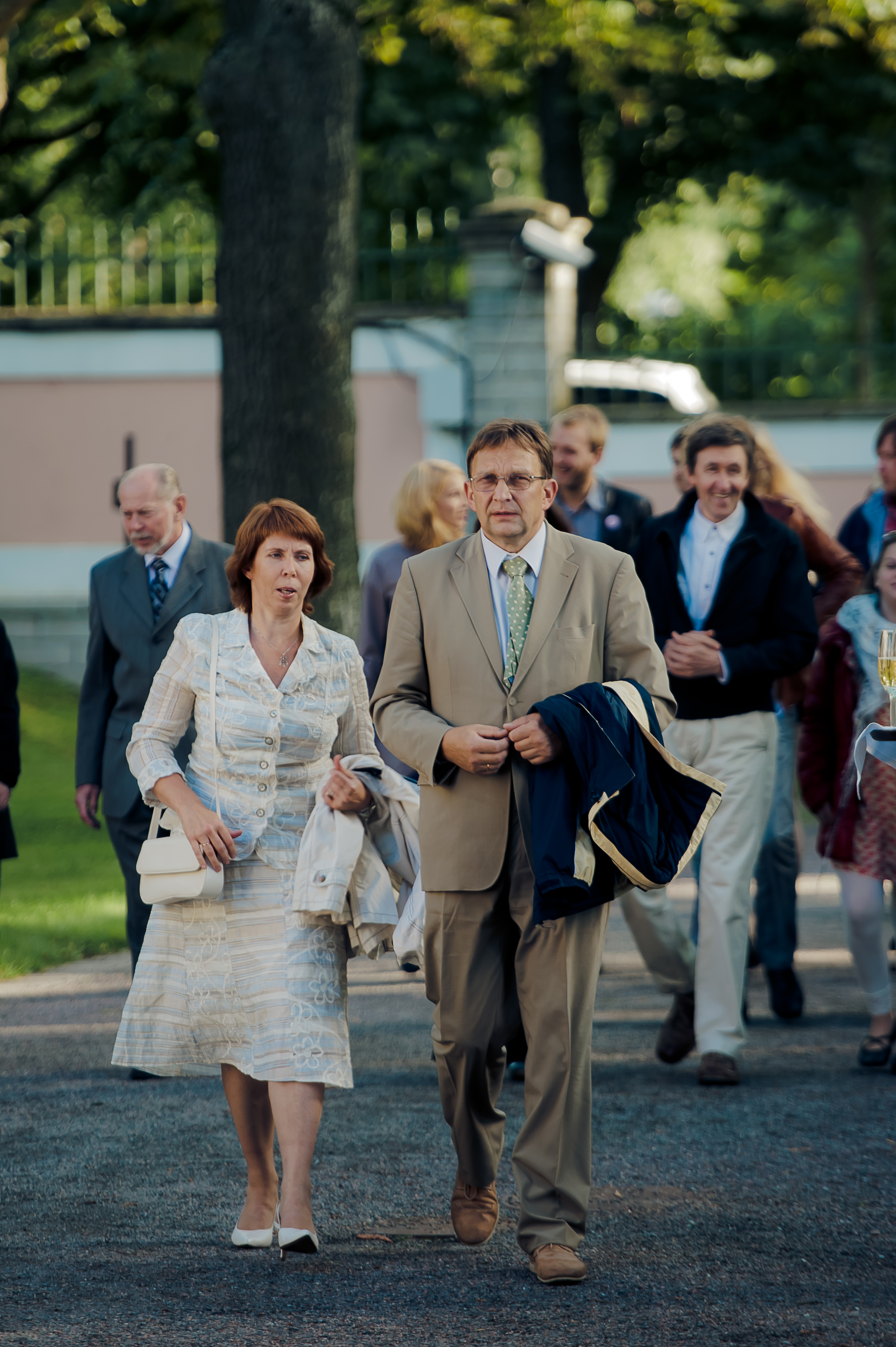
Sutrop with his wife Margit Sutrop, 2012

Urmas Sutrop (born 7 June 1956) is an Estonian linguist.

He graduated from high school in 1974 and in 1984 from the University of Tartu with a biology degree. His thesis was titled "Ardisia crispa A. DC. lehe baktersõlme siseste taimerakkude peenehitus." Near fifteen years after his first dissertation, he was awarded a PhD in philosophy by the University of Konstanz.

Sutrop is probably best known for being the director of the Institute of the Estonian Language, a position he held from 2000 until 2015. He is the president of the anthropology and ethnolinguistics departments, and he is also a professor in the general linguistics department. Since 2006 he has also been a professor at the University of Tartu.

== Bibliography ==
This is a partial list. Most of the texts below were published in Estonian unless otherwise indicated:

- "La langue estonienne", Eesti Instituut, 2002
- "Eesti viipekeel", Eesti Keele Sihtasutus, 2003 (coauthor)
- "Estonian language", Eesti Instituut, 2004 (English)
- "Die Estnische Sprache", Eesti Instituut, 2005 (German)
- "Estniska", Eesti Instituut, 2007
- "Viron kieli", Eesti Instituut, 2010
- "Värvinimede raamat" Eesti Keele Sihtasutus, 2011 (coauthor)
- Inglise päritolu sõnad eesti keeles, 2014 (with Aino Jõgi)

== Articles ==
- "Bertrand Russell in Estonia" (English)
- "Uuenev keel"
- "Trahvidega keelt paremaks ei muuda"
- "Eesti keel pole kunagi oma ajaloos olnud nii tugev kui praegu"
- "Erakorralistest valimistest"
- "Holokaust, kurjus ja meie"
- "Wittgenstein's Tractatus 3.333 and Russell's paradox"
