= Boel Flodgren =

Swedish professor of business law

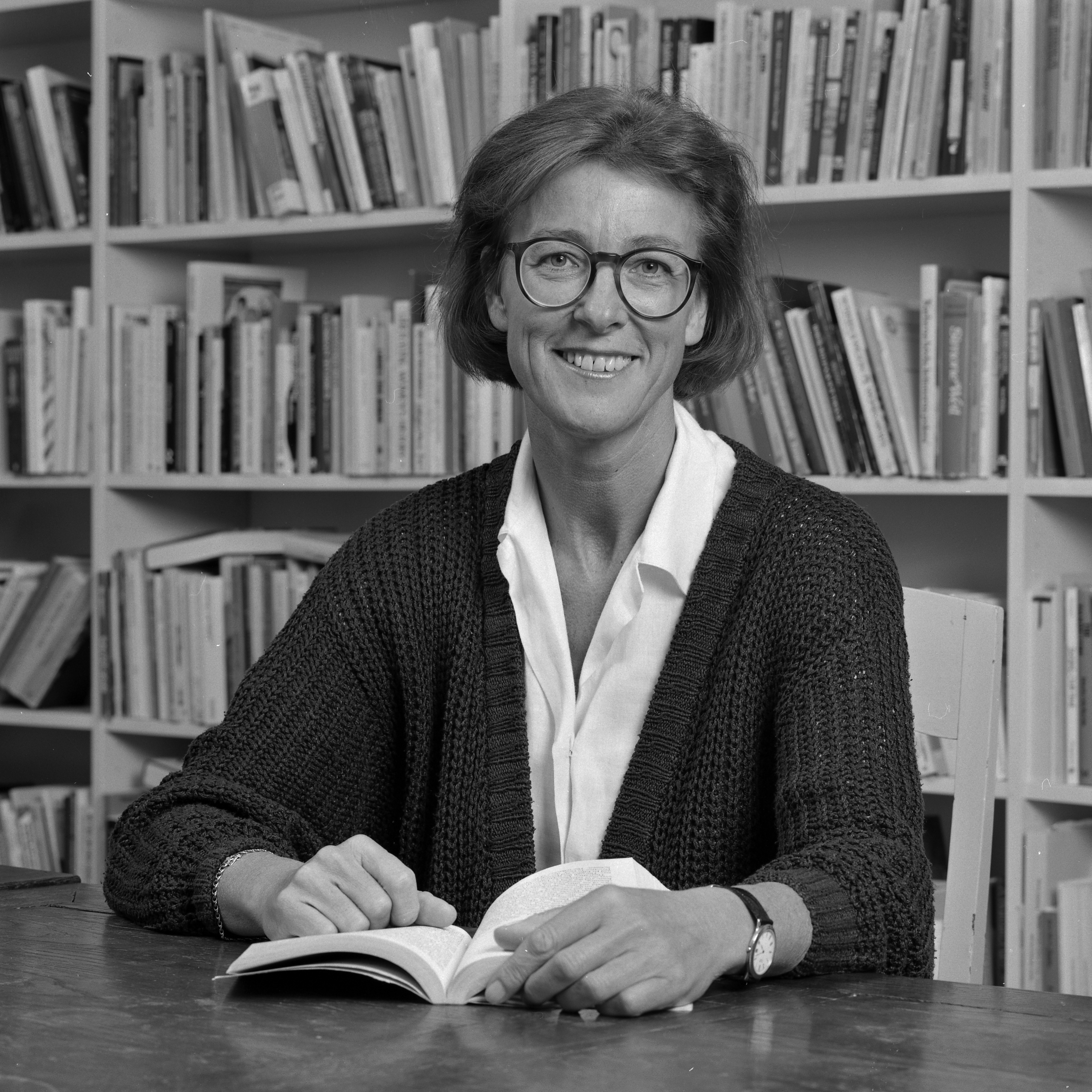
Boel Flodgren in 1992

Boel Flodgren (née Ohlsson), born 17 November 1942 in Örebro, Sweden, is a Swedish professor of business law. Between 1992 and 2003 she was the rector of Lund University. In 2011, she was awarded an honorary doctorate by the University of Oslo.

Academic offices
Preceded by Håkan Westling	Rector of Lund University; 1992–2003;	Succeeded by Göran Bexell
