= Erik Renström =

Swedish physician and academic administrator

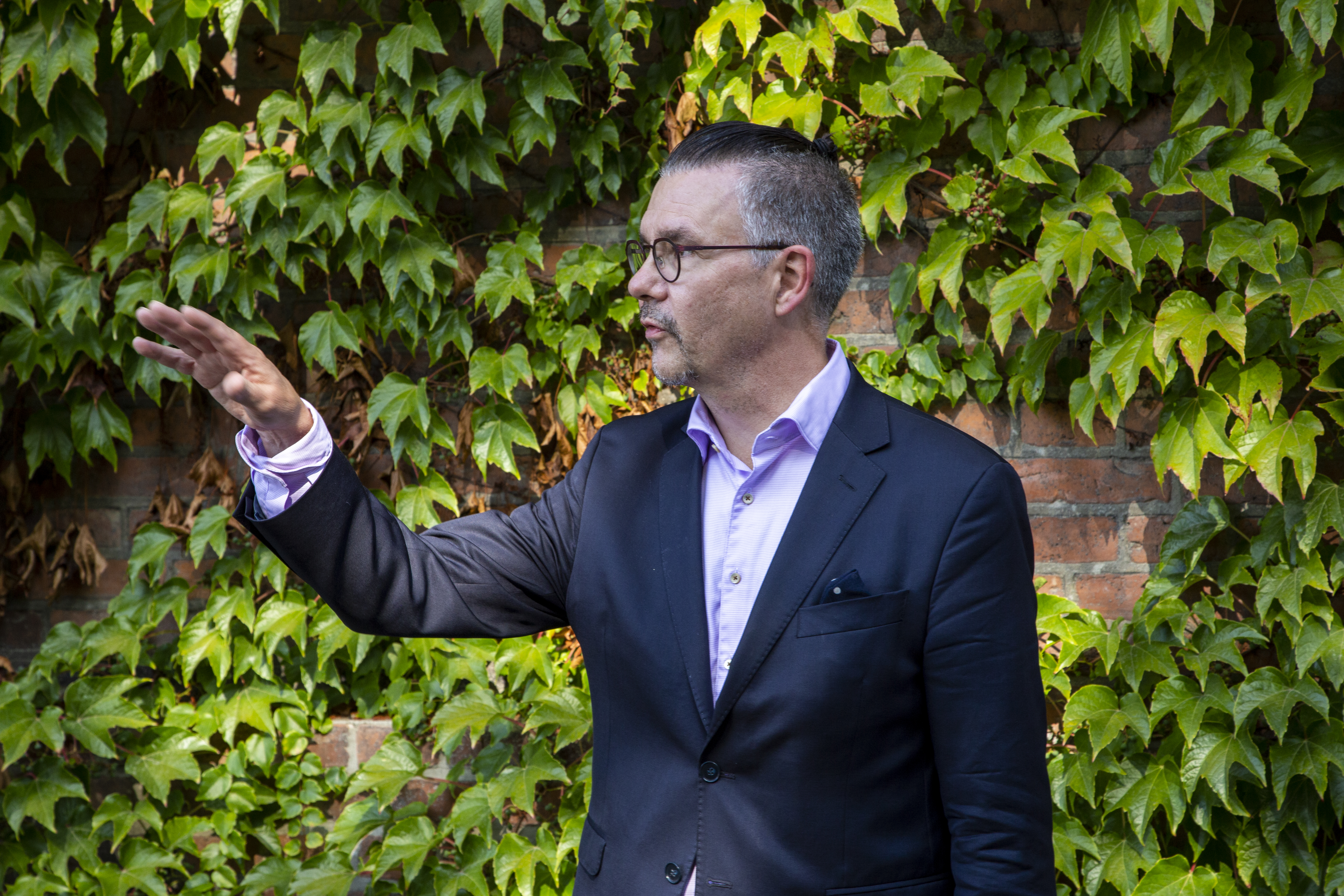

Vice-Chancellor of Lund University
- Incumbent
- Assumed office 2021
- Preceded by: Torbjörn von Schantz

Personal details
- Born: 1963 (age 62–63) Sweden
- Occupation: Physician, academic administrator

Erik Renström is a Swedish physician and academic administrator. He serves as the Vice-Chancellor of Lund University.
