= Margit Sutrop =

Estonian philosopher

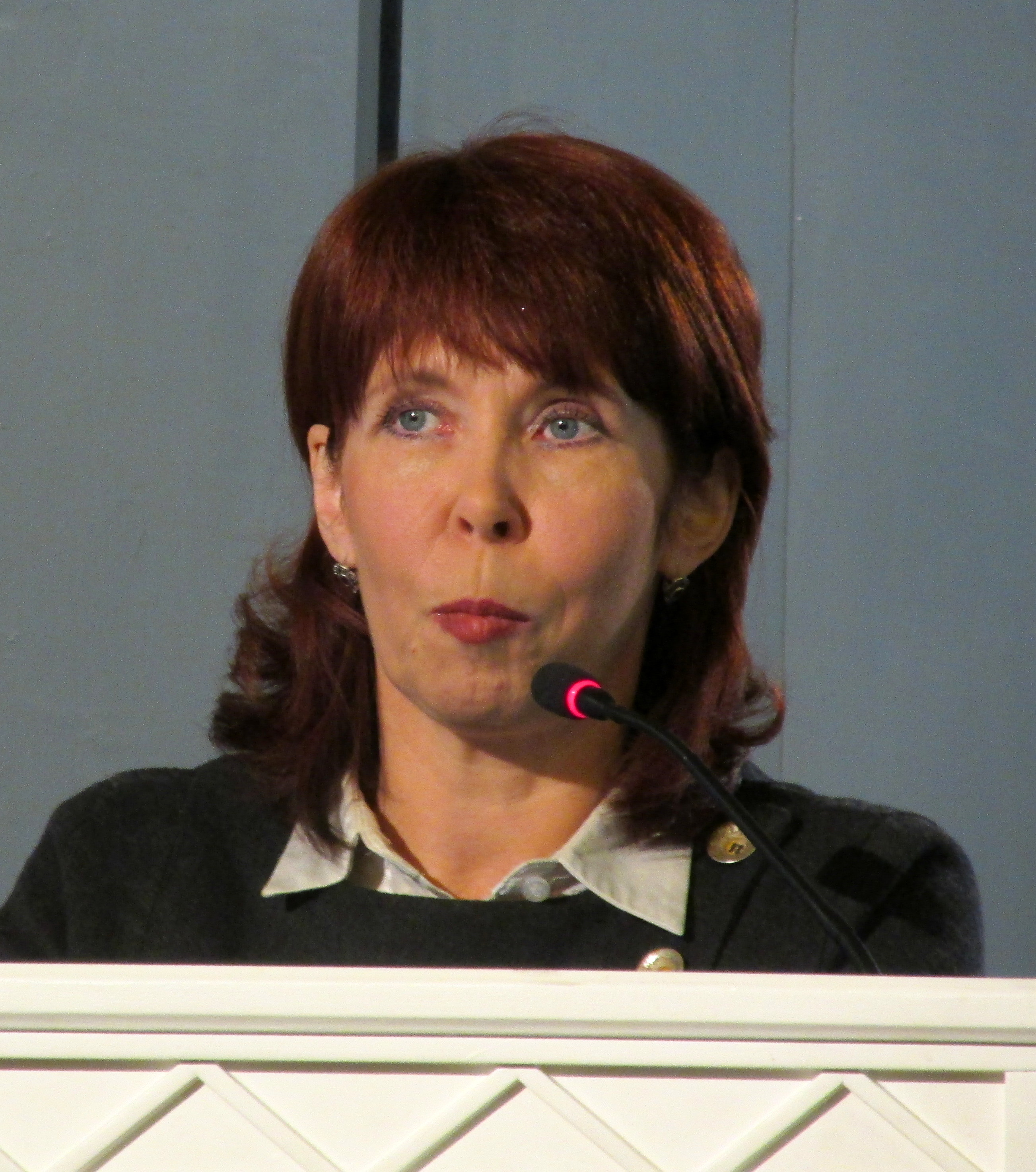

Member of XIV Riigikogu

Personal details
- Born: October 13, 1963 (age 62) Tartu, then part of Estonian SSR, Soviet Union
- Parent: Marika Mikelsaar (mother)
- Education: University of Tartu
- Occupation: Philosopher, ethicist, academic, politician

Margit Sutrop (née Mikelsaar; born 13 October 1963) is an Estonian philosopher, ethicist, academic, and politician.

She is Professor of Practical Philosophy at the University of Tartu, where she is also the founding Director of the Centre for Ethics. She has been elected twice to the Estonian Parliament and is a Member of Academia Europaea. Since 2004, she has served as an ethics expert to the European Commission. Her research interests include the value alignment of AI, trust in science, moral disagreements, value pluralism, values education, human nature, ethical frameworks for artificial intelligence, human genetic databases, e-health, and biometric technologies. She is a member of the XIV Riigikogu.

She was born in Tartu. In 1989, she graduated from the University of Tartu (journalism), and in 1991 (philosophy). She is married to Urmas Sutrop.

She stood as a candidate in the 2023 Riigikogu elections, where she received 1102 votes in constituency No 10 (Tartu).

== Awards ==
- 2010 Order of the White Star, IV class
- 2006 (Estonian: Avatud Eesti Fondi koosmeele auhind)
- 2013 Tartu University Small Medal
- 2019 Tartu University Grand Medal
- 2023 Johan Skytte Medal

== Selected publications ==
- "Teadus ja teadmistepõhine ühiskond", 2005 (with Urmas Sutrop)
- "Eesti Vabariigi naisministrid. Koguteos naistest poliitika tipus", 2007 (with Kristi Lõuk and Toomas Kiho)
- "Eetikakoodeksite käsiraamat", 2007 (co-author)
- "Mõtestatud Eesti – ühiseid väärtusi hoides", 2008 (with Triin Pisuke)
- "Eetika teadustes ja ühiskonnas. Tartu Ülikooli eetikakeskus 10", 2011 (with Triin Käpp; also in English)
- "Väärtuspõhine kool. Eesti ja maailma kogemus", 2013
- "Eetikakoodeksid. Väärtused, normid ja eetilised dilemmad", 2016
- "Marika Mikelsaar. Multiresistentne Mamma Bakter", 2008 (co-author)
