= Shandong Medical and Pharmaceutical University =

Medical school in Shandong, China

Coordinates: 37°27′35″N 121°27′32″E

- 山东医药大学 (Chinese)
- Former name: Binzhou Medical University
- Motto: 仁心 妙术
- Motto in English: Benevolent mind and heart
- Type: Public university
- Established: 1974; 52 years ago
- Principal: Shengtian Zhao (赵升田)
- Faculty: 500
- Students: 16,800
- Location: Yantai, Shandong, China
- Website: www.sdmpu.edu.cn

Chinese name
- Simplified Chinese: 山东医药大学
- Traditional Chinese: 山東醫藥大學
Transcriptions

Shandong Medical and Pharmaceutical University (Chinese: 山东医药大学) is a medical school in Shandong Province, China. It was established in 1974 with faculty from Qingdao Medical College who moved to Binzhou.

== History ==
1946-1974 In 1946, the former National Shandong University School of Medicine was established in Qingdao. In 1956, it was independently established as Qingdao Medical College. In October 1970, Qingdao Medical College moved to Beizhen as a whole.

1974-1983 In November 1974, the Beizhen Branch of Qingdao Medical College was established. In September 1981, it was independently established and renamed Beizhen Medical College.

1983.03-now In March 1983, Beinzhen Medical College was renamed Binzhou Medical College. In 1985, the Department of Disability Medicine was founded.

In July 2001, a new campus in Yantai City, Shandong Province was started to establish. In September 2002, the Yantai campus of Binzhou Medical College was put into use.

In June 2003, the school was granted the right to confer a master's degree, and in 2004 it enrolled the first master's students in three majors: human anatomy, histology and embryology; internal medicine; oral clinical medicine.

In May 2013, it was selected as the first batch of pilot universities for the reform of the postgraduate training model for the master's degree in clinical medicine.

In March 2026, It was renamed Shandong Medical and Pharmaceutical University.

== Notable alumni ==
- Yu Baofa
