= Torbjörn von Schantz =

Swedish academic and zoologist

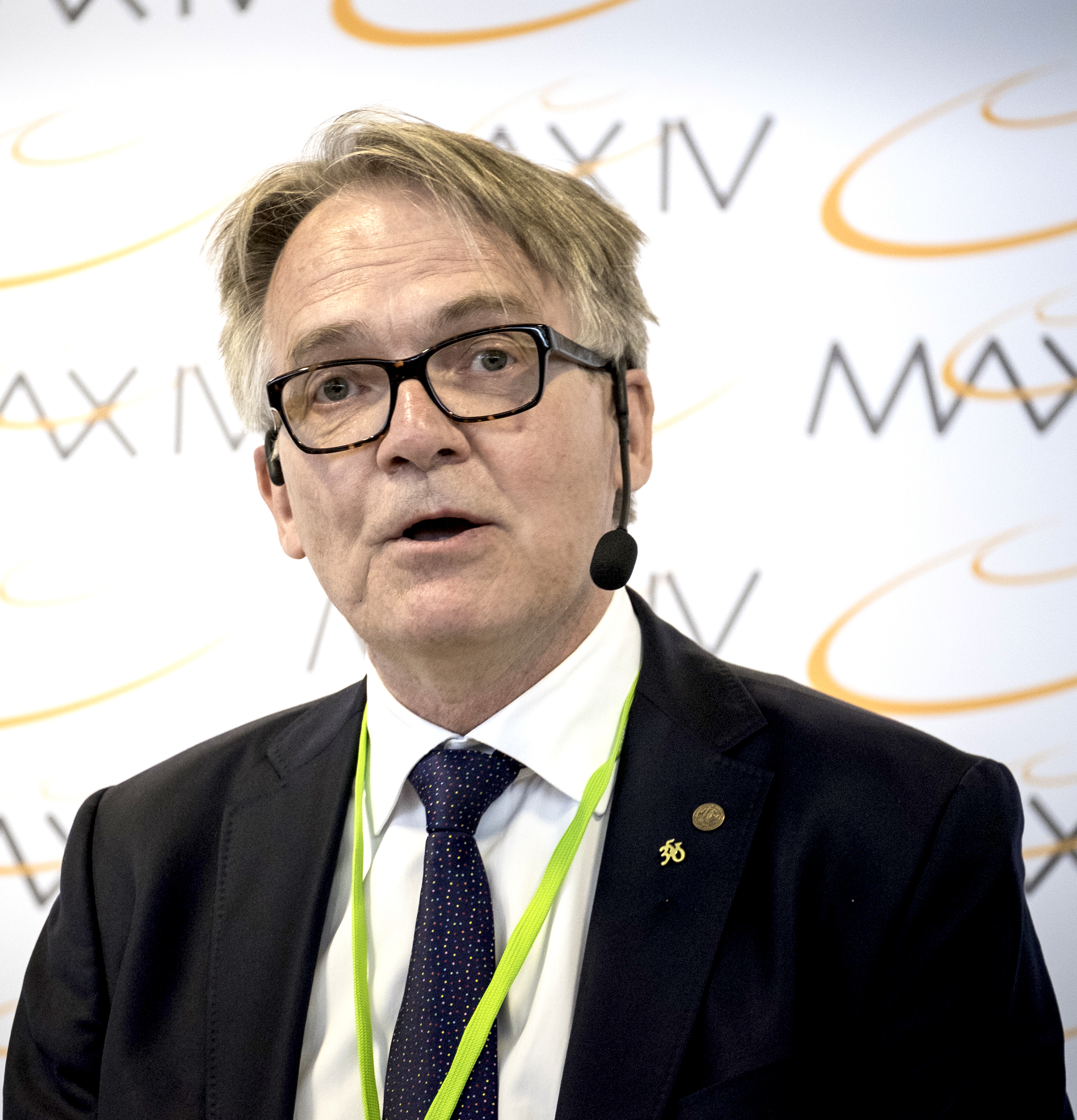
von Schantz in June 2016

Torbjörn Åkesson von Schantz (born 16 March 1954 in Vimmerby, Sweden) is a Swedish professor of zoology and the former rector magnificus of Lund University. Between 2013 and 2014 he was pro-rector of the Swedish University of Agricultural Sciences, and he then became rector of Lund University.

He earned his PhD in 1981 with the dissertation Evolution of group living, and the importance of food and social organization in population regulation – a study on the red fox (Vulpes vulpes) and was appointed as professor of zoology at Lund University in 2000. He was elected as a member of the university board in 2004.

Academic offices
Preceded by Per Eriksson	Rector of Lund University; 2015–2020	Succeeded by Erik Renström
