= Buloxibutid =

Chemical compound

Clinical data
- Other names: VP-01

Legal status
- Legal status: Investigational

Identifiers
- IUPAC name: butyl N-[3-[4-(imidazol-1-ylmethyl)phenyl]-5-(2-methylpropyl)thiophen-2-yl]sulfonylcarbamate
- CAS Number: 477775-14-7
- PubChem CID: 9804984
- DrugBank: DB18038
- ChemSpider: 7980744
- UNII: RC2V4W0EYC
- KEGG: D13133
- ChEMBL: ChEMBL189568

Chemical and physical data
- Formula: C_{23}H_{29}N_{3}O_{4}S_{2}
- Molar mass: 475.62 g·mol^{−1}
- 3D model (JSmol): Interactive image
- SMILES: CCCCOC(=O)NS(=O)(=O)C1=C(C=C(S1)CC(C)C)C2=CC=C(C=C2)CN3C=CN=C3
- InChI: InChI=1S/C23H29N3O4S2/c1-4-5-12-30-23(27)25-32(28,29)22-21(14-20(31-22)13-17(2)3)19-8-6-18(7-9-19)15-26-11-10-24-16-26/h6-11,14,16-17H,4-5,12-13,15H2,1-3H3,(H,25,27); Key:XTEOJPUYZWEXFI-UHFFFAOYSA-N

Buloxibutid is an investigational new drug that is being evaluated to treat COVID-19 infections. It is an angiotensin II receptor type 2 agonist. The drug was discovered and developed by Professor Anders Hallberg and colleagues at the University of Uppsala. As at late 2024 it was on large scale trials for treatment of lung fibrosis following successful small-scale trials. Development is supported by investment from Sanofi.
