= Johan Skytte Medal =

Award given by the University of Tartu

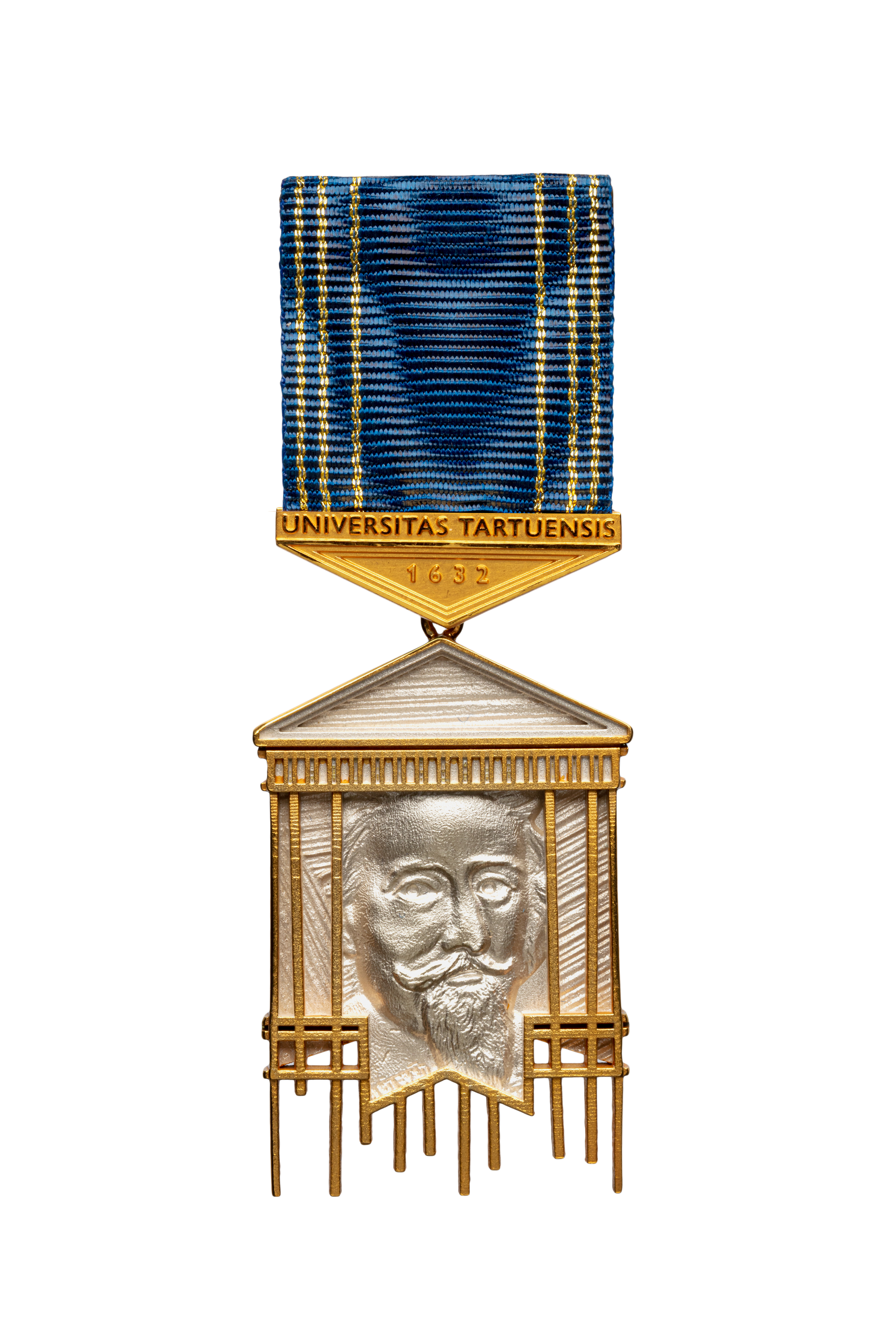
Johan Skytte Medal. Author: Andres Tennus

Johan Skytte medal is an honorary decoration of the University of Tartu which is awarded to a statesperson or public figure who has significantly contributed to the development of the University of Tartu and Estonian higher education in the recent years. Medal was established in 1995.

Johan Skytte (1577–1645) was a Swedish statesman, and the first chancellor of the University of Tartu, Estonia.

The Johan Skytte medal is a gold-plated silver pendant in the shape of the portico of the University of Tartu main building – the symbol of Estonian higher education. An embossed portrait of Johan Skytte is between the vertical lines symbolising the colonnade. The Johan Skytte Medal has a ribbon made of dark blue moiré silk, with six golden stripes symbolizing the six columns of the main building of the University. The gold-plated triangle is bearing the name of the university of Tartu in Latin and the year of founding the University, 1632.

Recipients of the Johan Skytte Medal are:

- 1995 Marju Lauristin
- 1995 Mart Laar
- 1996 Mihkel Pärnoja
- 1998 Katarina Brodin
- 1998 Jacques Faure
- 1998 Kai Lie
- 1998 Svend Roed Nielsen
- 2001 Lennart Meri
- 2002 Andrus Ansip
- 2004 Jüri Raidla
- 2005 Andres Lipstok
- 2008 Dag Hartelius
- 2009 Rein Taagepera
- 2012 Tõnis Lukas
- 2015 Ene Ergma
- 2017 Katri Raik
- 2019 Eva Åkesson
- 2020 Tanel Kiik
- 2020 Kersti Kaljulaid
- 2023 Margit Sutrop
