= Lisbeth Olsson =

Swedish microbiologist and professor

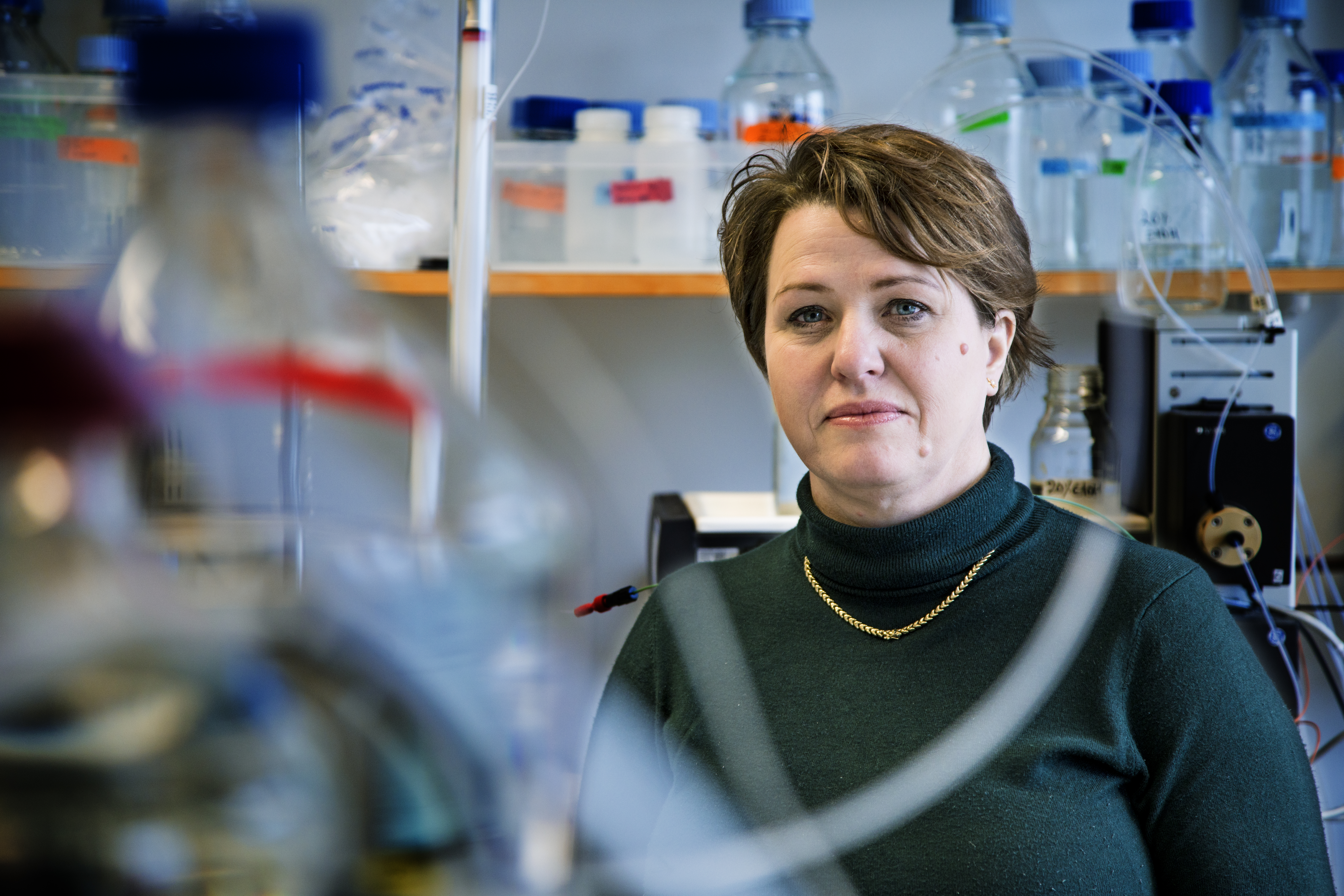
- Lisbeth Olsson, Chalmers University of Technology, 2018
- Born: November 22, 1963 (age 62); Höör
- Education: Lund University
- Scientific career
- Workplaces: Chalmers University of Technology
- Thesis: (1994)
- Website: www.chalmers.se/en/departments/bio/research/industrial-biotechnology/Pages/default.aspx

Lisbeth Olsson is a Swedish microbiologist and a professor in industrial biotechnology at Chalmers University of Technology in Gothenburg.

== Early life ==
On November 22, 1963, Olsson was born in Höör, Sweden.

== Education ==
In 1987, Olsson obtained her master's degree in chemical engineering from Lund University in Lund, Sweden. In 1994, Olsson acquired a PhD degree in Applied Microbiology from Lund University in Lund, Sweden.

== Career ==
In 1987, Olsson became an analytical chemist for Draco, a pharmaceutical company, for a year. In 1994, Olsson began to work as a postdoctoral researcher at Technical University of Denmark (DTU) in Copenhagen, Denmark. In 2006, Olsson advanced her academic career and was appointed as a full professor at Technical University of Denmark. In 2008, Olsson was recruited to Chalmers University of Technology, where she started her own research group in industrial biotechnology. Her research focuses on design and use of microorganisms and enzymes in processes in which plant cell wall materials are converted to valuable fuels, chemicals, and materials. She also works in Wallenberg Wood Science Center, which aims to develop materials from wood. She leads the Nordic collaborative project HGBiofuels aiming to develop sustainable production of biofuels. Additionally, she is a technical advisor for Taurus Energy AB.

In August 2021 the Swedish Research Council appointed Lisbeth Olsson as the new secretary general for the area of Research Infrastructures. The Swedish Research Council has five scientists serving as secretary general in different areas. Each one has a high level of scientific expertise, contributing both knowledge and experience to the organisation. They are also part of the Swedish Research Council’s management team.

== Awards ==
- Chalmers Foundation Award (2018)
- Charles D Scott Award (2018)
- Elected as a member of Royal Swedish Academy of Engineering Sciences (2017)
