= Yu Baofa =

Oncologist (b. 1958)

Dr. Yu Baofa
- Born: 1958 (age 67–68); Jinan, China
- Education: Binzhou Medical College, Peking Union Medical College
- Occupation: Oncologist
- Medical career
- Research: Intratumoral Cancer Therapy
- Notable works: Ultra Minimum Incision Personalized Intra-Tumoral Chemo-Immuno (UMIPIC) Therapy.
- Website: www.baofatherapy.com

Yu Baofa (Chinese: 于保法; pinyin: Yú Bǎofǎ; born in 1958) is a Chinese oncologist and researcher in intratumoral cancer therapy and drug development. He is the Founder, CEO and Chairman of Baofa Cancer Hospital Network China in Jinan, Beijing and Dongping. He also developed Ultra Minimum Incision Personalized Intra-Tumoral Chemo-Immuno (UMIPIC) Therapy.

== Early life and education ==
Yu was born in 1958 in Jinan, Shandong, China. During his childhood, the local doctors he saw in his village inspired him to become a physician in the future. He was educated in Binzhou Medical College. Four years later, he graduated and landed a job in the Shandong Tumor Research Institute and transferred to the China Academy of Medical Sciences for further studies in cancer.

In 1984, his mother was diagnosed with esophageal cancer and later died. Soon after, his best friend's father died of cancer as well. These experiences motivated him to deepen his research of cancer.

In 1985, Yu enrolled in Peking Union Medical College (tumour department) in Beijing to further his studies and received a master's degree of Medicine. After graduation, he worked at the China-Japan Friendship Hospital in Beijing for a year, before attending the School of Medicine of the University of California, San Diego for doctoral studies.

== Career ==
- In February 1990, Yu performed research on anti-cancer medicines and intratumoral therapy. It was at the time he researched on drug slow-release system therapy (SRST).
- In 1992, Yu joined the Salk Institute in La Jolla, California as Senior Associate Researcher for tumour and cancer genes. A year later, he was appointed as Associate Professor at the University of California, San Diego.
- In 1998, he returned to China and founded the TaiMei Baofa Cancer Hospital in Dongping, China.
- In 2003, Yu was elected as the deputy of the 10th National People's Congress.
- At present, he is the CEO of Immuno Oncology Systems (IOS) & Baofa Therapy Inc.

== Hospitals ==
Taimei Baofa Cancer Hospital was the first hospital established among three of Dr. Yu's hospitals. Since 1997, it has raised 38 million yuan (US$4.6 million). Yu also invited experts from Beijing and Jinan to offer training to his medical staff occasionally.

His hospitals utilize various cancer treatments including surgery, radiotherapy, biological therapy, UMIPIC, as well as traditional Chinese medical treatments.

== Awards ==
- 2006- China Youth Volunteer Action Contribution Award
- 2005- First overseas Chinese "Outstanding Entrepreneurship Award"

== Patents ==
- "US Patent for Compositions and methods for targeting of treating neoplasms Patent (Patent # 9,000,036 issued April 7, 2015) - Justia Patents Search". patents.justia.com.
- "US Patent Application for COMPOSITIONS AND METHODS FOR TARGETING OF TREATING NEOPLASMS Patent Application (Application #20140037695 issued February 6, 2014) - Justia Patents Search". patents.justia.com.
- "US Patent for Targeting cancer therapy combination Patent (Patent # 8,501,243 issued August 6, 2013) - Justia Patents Search". patents.justia.com.
- "US Patent for Combinations and methods for treating neoplasms Patent (Patent # 7,927,612 issued April 19, 2011) - Justia Patents Search". patents.justia.com.
- "US Patent Application for COMPOSITION AND METHOD FOR TREATING TUMOR Patent Application (Application #20100104660 issued April 29, 2010) - Justia Patents Search". patents.justia.com.
- "US Patent Application for Combinations and methods for treating neoplasms Patent Application (Application #20050118187 issued June 2, 2005) - Justia Patents Search". patents.justia.com.
- "US Patent for Combinations and methods for treating neoplasms Patent (Patent # 6,811,788 issued November 2, 2004) - Justia Patents Search". patents.justia.com.
- "US Patent Application for Combinations and methods for treating neoplasms Patent Application (Application #20020044919 issued April 18, 2002) - Justia Patents Search". patents.justia.com.

== Publications ==
- Yu, Baofa; Lu, Yuanfei (2014). "Hapten-enhanced personalized chemoimmunotherapy by intratumoral drug delivery in advanced pancreatic cancer". Journal of Clinical Oncology. 32 (3 suppl): 333. doi:10.1200/jco.2014.32.3_suppl.333.
- Yu, Baofa; Ma, Zhenlu; Guan, Changjiang; Han, Wei; Che, Yebin; Fu, Qiang (2012-05-20). "Intensity modulation of chemoimmunotherapy for late stages of liver carcinoma". Journal of Clinical Oncology. 30 (15 suppl) e14716. doi:10.1200/jco.2012.30.15_suppl.e14716.
- Wang, Gangshi; Chen, Lichan; Yu, Baofa; Zellmer, Lucas; Xu, Ningzhi; Liao, D. Joshua (28 January 2016). "Learning about the Importance of Mutation Prevention from Curable Cancers and Benign Tumors". Journal of Cancer. 7 (4): 436–445. doi:10.7150/jca.13832. PMC 4749364. PMID 26918057.
- Ma, Yukui; Jia, Yuping; Chen, Lichan; Ezeogu, Lewis; Yu, Baofa; Xu, Ningzhi; Liao, D. Joshua (1 September 2015). "Weaknesses and Pitfalls of Using Mice and Rats in Cancer Chemoprevention Studies". Journal of Cancer. 6 (10): 1058–1065. doi:10.7150/jca.12519. PMC 4565856. PMID 26366220.
- Gao, Feng; Jing, Peng; Liu, Jian; Lu, Yuanfei; Zhang, Peicheng; Han, Wei; Liu, Guoliang; Ru, Ning; Cui, Guanghui; Sun, Chenglin; Che, Yebing; Zhang, Huaming; Hu, Qnglong; Wang, Huan-You; Wu, Yingli; Guan, Changjiang; Fu, Qiang; Ma, Zhenlu; Yu, Baofa (2015). "Hapten-enhanced overall survival time in advanced hepatocellular carcinoma by ultro-minimum incision personalized intratumoral chemoimmunotherapy". Journal of Hepatocellular Carcinoma. 2: 57–68. doi:10.2147/JHC.S80756. PMC 4918285. PMID 27508195.
- Yu, Baofa; Lu, Yuanfei; Gao, Feng; Jing, Peng; Wei, Han; Zhang, Peicheng; Liu, Guoliang; Ru, Ning; Cui, Guanghui; Xu, Xinhai; Sun, Chenglin; Guan, Changjiang; Che, Yebing; Wu, Yingli; Ma, Zhenlu; Fu, Qiang; Liu, Jian; Wang, Huan-You (2015). "Hapten-enhanced therapeutic effect in advanced stages of lung cancer by ultra-minimum incision personalized intratumoral chemoimmunotherapy therapy". Lung Cancer: Targets and Therapy. 6: 1–11. doi:10.2147/LCTT.S70679. PMC 5217516. PMID 28210146.
- Bu, Jieqiong; Yu, Baofa (Oct 2007). "Slow intra-tumor release od drugs on B16 melonoma in Mice". Journal of Shandong University (Health Sciences). 45: 988–91.
- Yu, Baofa; Yan, Han; Guoliang, Liu (2003). "Animal Experiment of Introtumoral Drug(ARA-C) Slow Release Depot Therapy". Journal of Shandong University (Health Science). 41 (Suppl): 1–3.
- Yu, Baofa; Ma, Zhenlu; Guan, Changjiang (2003). "Clinical Application of Drug Slow Release Depot Therapy in 780 patterns with malignant". Journal of Shandong University (Health Science). 41 (Suppl): 14–18.
- Hui, Li; Cha, Yebin; Liu, Guoliang; Yu, Baofa (2003). "Slow Release Depot Therapy for 10 patients with advanced or recurrent bladder carcinomas". Journal of Shandong University (Health Science). 41 (Suppl): 4–6.
- Yu, Baofa; Lepage, Richard; Wang, Yan; D'Agostino, Horacio; Rice, Roger; Kim, Sinil (1995). "Spatial Distribution and Pharmacokinetics of free drug and liposomal drug after intratumoral injection". Journal of QiLu Oncology. 2 (4).
- Yu, Baofa; Kim, Sinil (1994). "Achohole With Intratumoral Drug Injection and Pharmacokinetics of Drug After Intratumoral Injection: A New Concept of Intratumoral therapeutic Coagulum With Drug Depots". Journal of Current Oncology. 1 (2): 97–100.
- Sharma, Prem Mohini; Bowman, Marianne; Yu, Bao-Fa; Sukumar, Saraswati (1994). "A Rodent Model for Wilms Tumors: Embryonal Kidney Neoplasms Induced by N-Nitroso-N'-Methylurea". Proceedings of the National Academy of Sciences of the United States of America. 91 (21): 9931–9935. Bibcode:1994PNAS...91.9931S. doi:10.1073/pnas.91.21.9931. ISSN 0027-8424. JSTOR 2365736. PMC 44931. PMID 7937920.
- Yu, Baofa; Zhu, Guohon; Tan, Jin; Liu, Lin; Yu, Zehou; Liu, Xifan; Zhu, Jun; Chen, Li (1990). "Preliminary Clinical Application of Bone Marrow Imaging Using Tc-99m Polyphase liposomes in the malignant lymphoma". Chinese Journal of Oncology. 12 (4): 297–300.
- Yu, Baofa (August 1989). "A new bone marrow imaging agent: preparation of sup 99m Tc-polyphase liposomes and its animals experiment". Chinese Journal of Nuclear Medicine. 9 (3): 167–168.
- Yu, Baofa; Tan, Jin; Liu, Lin; Wang, Yan; Zhang, Yumeng; Yong, YongQun; Gu, Xeuqiu; Gu, Maoyu (1988). "Animal experiment using 99mTc labelled polyphase liposome and application of the radio-imaging with 99mTc-polyphase liposome". Journal of Shenyan College of Pharmacy. 5 (1): 1–8.
- Yu, Baofa; Lou, Qin; Liu, Lin; Tan, Jin (1988). "A new lymph node imaging agent: Tc-99m labelled liposomes and animal experiment". Chinese Journal of Oncology. 10 (4): 270–273.
