= Anders Hagfeldt =

Researcher in dye-sensitised solar cells

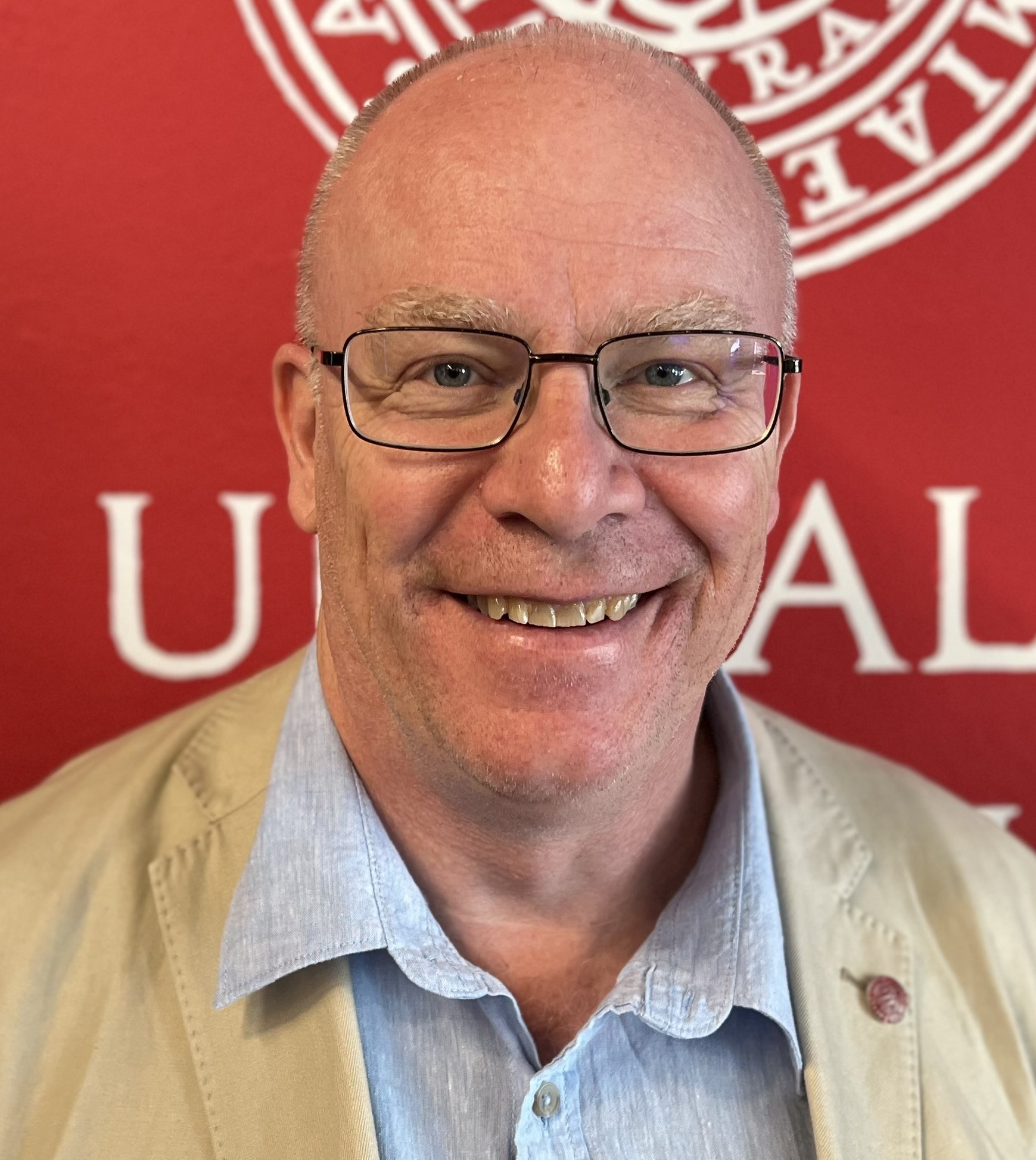
- Hagfeldt in Almedalen 2023
- Born: 16 February 1964 (age 62)
- Education: Uppsala University
- Awards: Björkén Prize (2016)
- Scientific career
- Fields: Dye-sensitized solar cell; Perovskite solar cell; Solar fuel
- Workplaces: Uppsala University; Swiss Federal Institute of Technology in Lausanne
- Thesis: Microporous and polycrystalline semiconductor electrodes studied by photoelectrochemical methods supported by quantum chemical calculations and photoelectron spectroscopy (1993)

Anders Hagfeldt (born 16 February 1964) is a Swedish material scientist. Since 2021 he has been vice-chancellor of Uppsala University, where he is a professor of physical chemistry and where he received his PhD in 1993.

His h-index – according to Scopus – is 157, based on 677 published documents. Times Higher Education listed him as the 46th top material scientist of the past decade. His memberships include the European Academy of Sciences and Arts, the Royal Society of Sciences in Uppsala, the Royal Swedish Academy of Engineering Sciences and the Royal Swedish Academy of Sciences. He has an honorary doctorate from the Université Paris Diderot and is a professeur honoraire of the École Polytechnique Fédérale de Lausanne in Switzerland.

He is deputy editor-in-chief of the Journal of Materials Chemistry A.

He received the Björkén Prize in 2016.

In September 2023 he was cleared in a research misconduct case.

== Honours ==
- (Sweden) H. M. The King's Medal, 12th size, worn on the ribbon of the Order of the Seraphim (6 June 2026)

Academic offices
Preceded by Eva Åkesson	Rector of Uppsala University; 1 January 2021 –	Succeeded by –
