= Göran Bexell =

Swedish academic

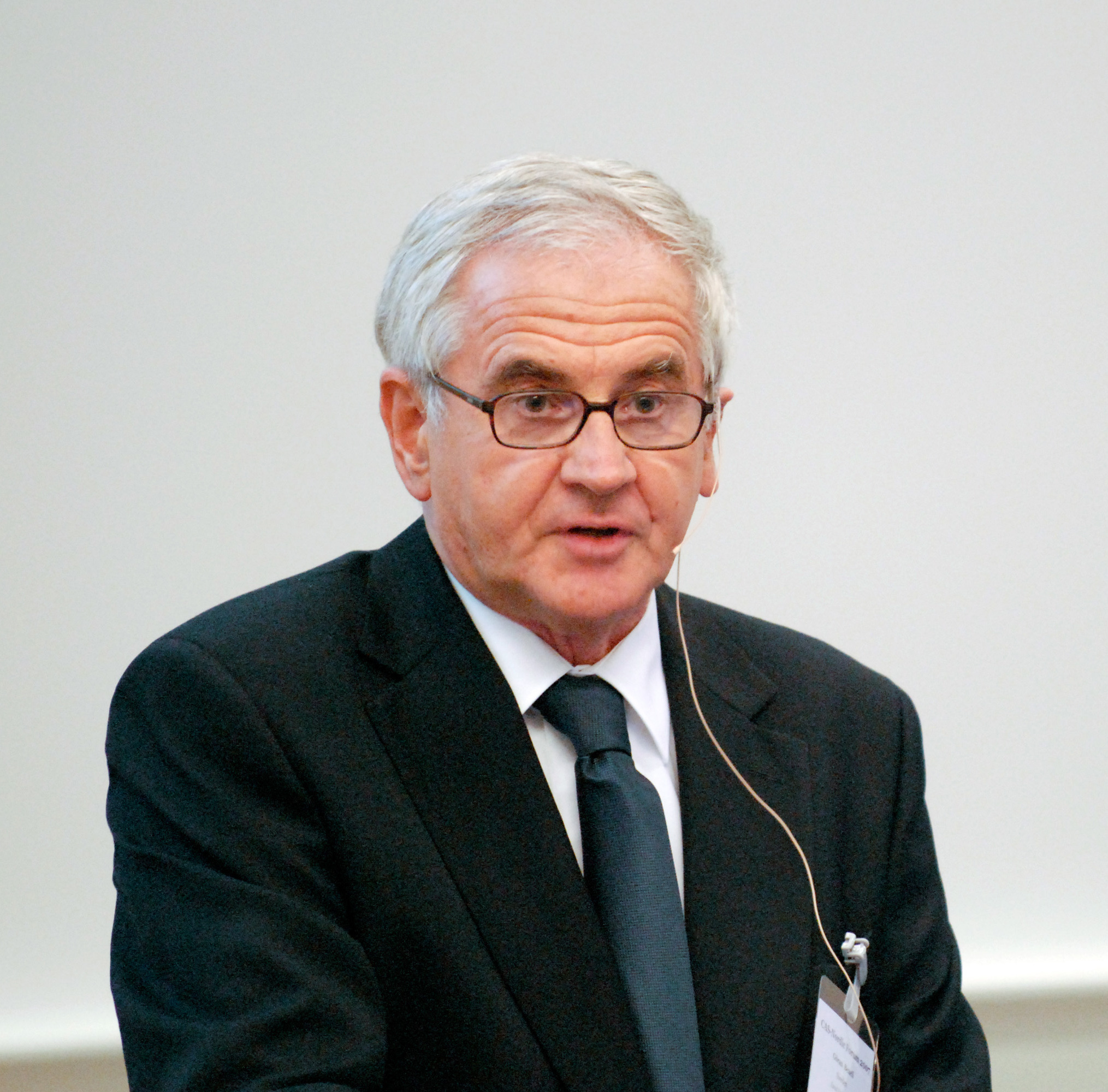
Bexell in 2007

Göran Bertil David Bexell (born 24 December 1943 in Högsby) is a Swedish professor in ethics. Between 2003 and 2008, he served as the rector, i.e. vice-chancellor, of Lund University.

Academic offices
Preceded by Boel Flodgren	Rector of Lund University; 2003–2008;	Succeeded by Per Eriksson
