= Per Eriksson (professor) =

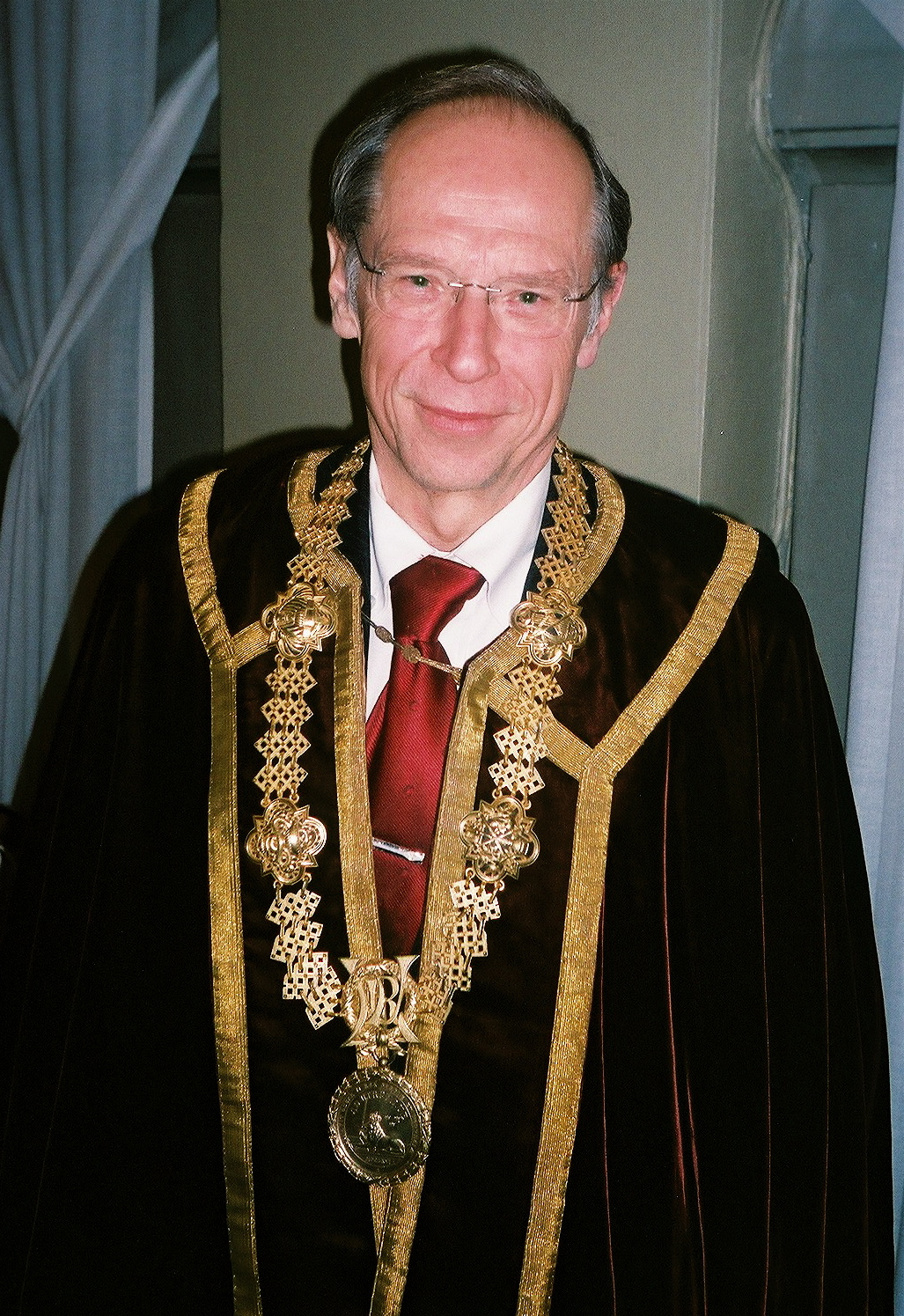
Per Eriksson

Per Filip Billy Eriksson (born 1949 in Sölvesborg, Sweden) is a Swedish scientist and professor in signal processing. He served as rector of Lund University from 2009 to 2014, as rector of Blekinge Institute of Technology from 1989 to 2000 and director-general at Vinnova from 2001 to 2008. His membership in the Baptist Hyllie Park Church was once the subject of a heated controversy regarding his appointment as rector of Lund University.

Academic offices
Preceded by Göran Bexell	Rector of Lund University; 2009–2014	Succeeded by Torbjörn von Schantz
Preceded by –	Rector of Blekinge Institute of Technology; 1989–2000	Succeeded by Lars Haikola
