= Swedish Chemical Society =

Learned society in Sweden

- Svenska kemisamfundet
- Formation: 1883
- Type: Learned society
- Headquarters: Stockholm
- Location: Sweden
- Official language: Swedish
- Publication: Kemivärlden Biotech
- Website: www.chemsoc.se

The Swedish Chemical Society (Swedish: Svenska kemisamfundet) was established in 1883 and is a nonprofit organisation to promote the development of chemistry in Sweden. The society is based on Wallingatan, Stockholm. Kemivärlden Biotech (ISSN 1653-5596) is the monthly magazine of the Swedish Chemical Society. The society also awards the annual Arrhenius Plaque for contributions in the field of science or to the society.
