= List of German chemists =

This is a list of German chemists.

== A ==
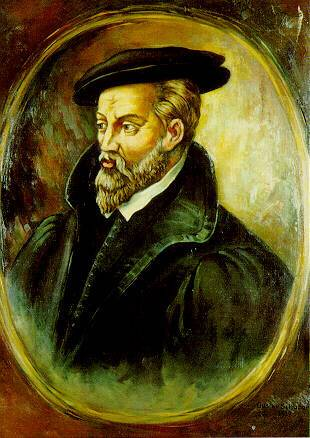
Georgius Agricola

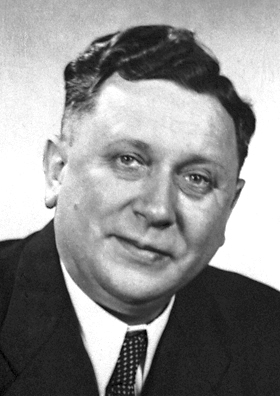
Kurt Alder

- Richard Abegg
- Friedrich Accum
- Franz Karl Achard
- Georgius Agricola
- Reinhart Ahlrichs
- Albertus Magnus
- Kurt Alder
- Fritz Aldinger
- Reinhold Aman
- Otto Ambros
- Johann Gerhard Reinhard Andreae
- Andreas von Antropoff
- Momme Andresen
- Leonid Andrussow
- Richard Anschütz
- Rolf Appel
- Fritz Arndt
- Karl Arnold
- Friedrich Auerbach
- Karl von Auwers

== B ==
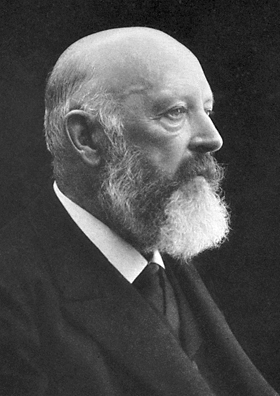
Adolf von Baeyer

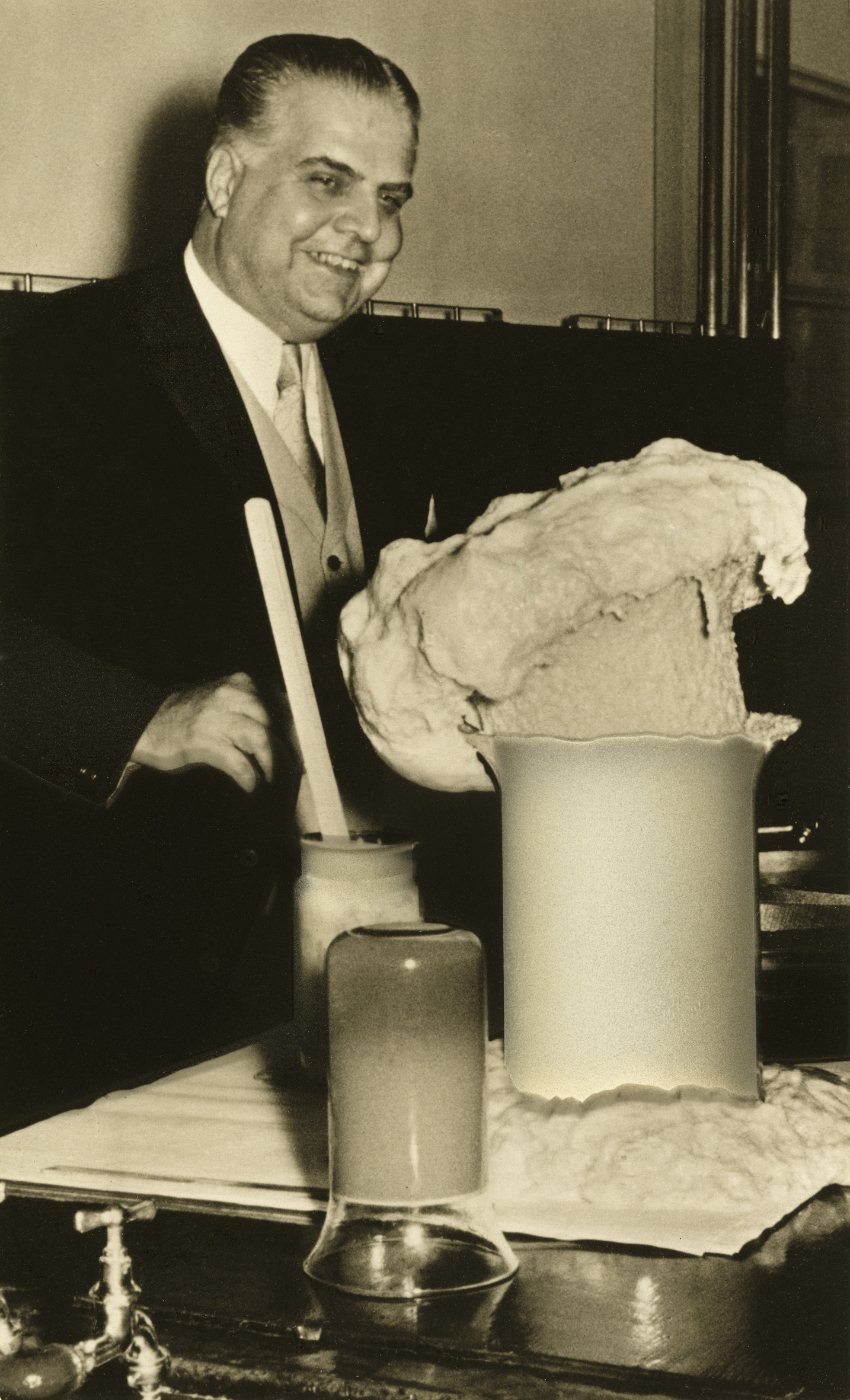
Otto Bayer demonstrated in 1952 his invention Polyurethan

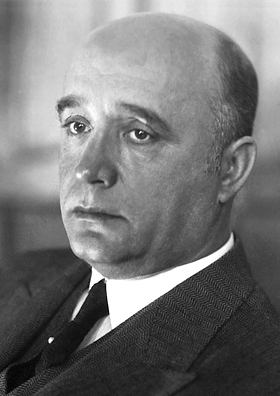
Friedrich Bergius

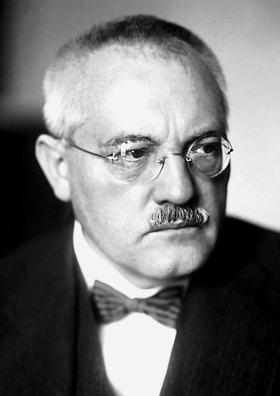
Carl Bosch

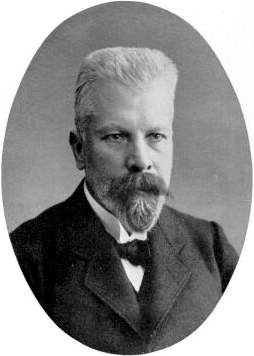
Eduard Buchner

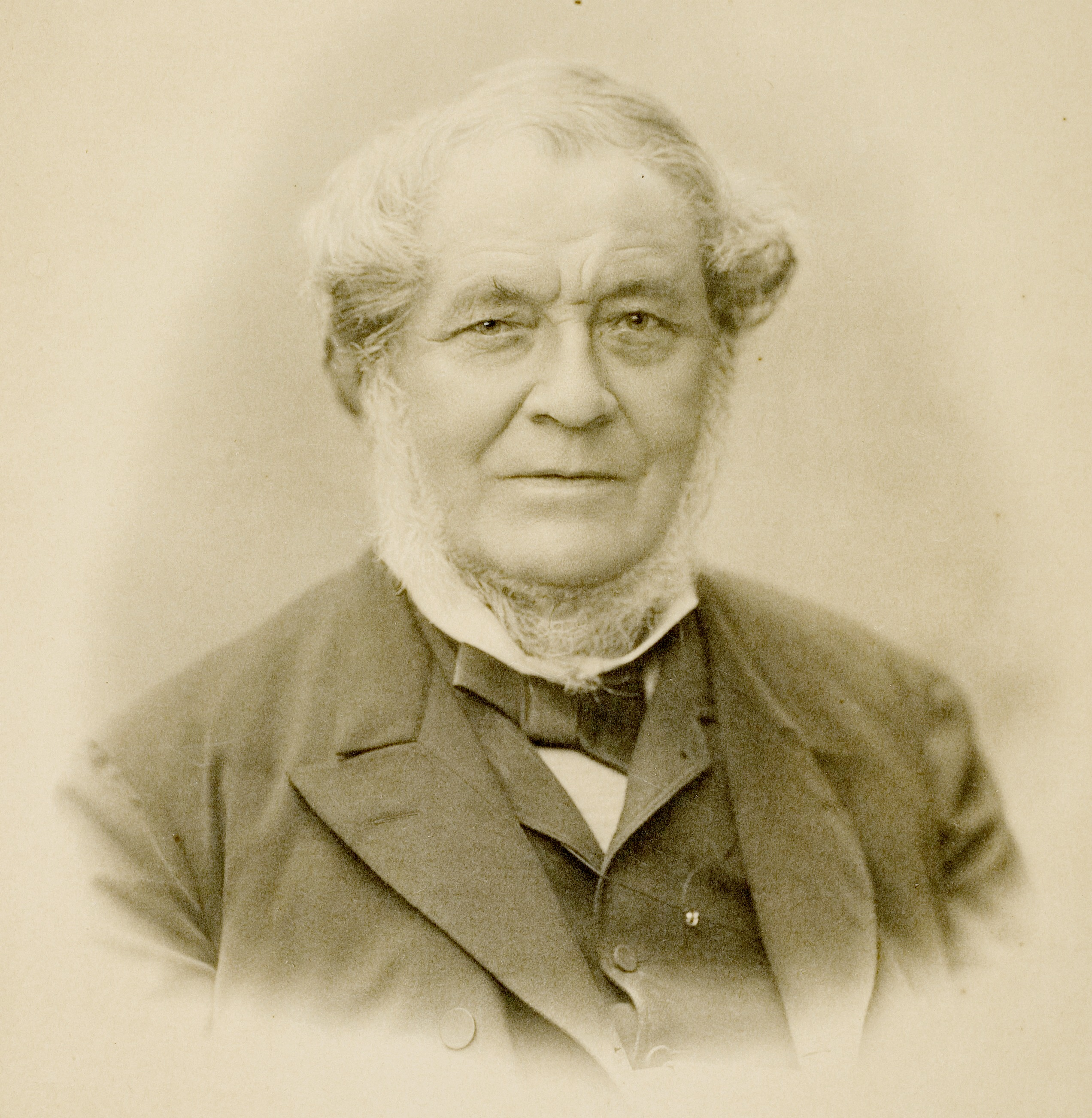
Robert Wilhelm Bunsen

- Lambert Heinrich von Babo
- Manfred Baerns
- Adolf von Baeyer
- Eugen Bamberger
- Johann Conrad Barchusen
- Eugen Baumann
- Otto Bayer
- Johann Joachim Becher
- Gerd Becker
- Johan Heinrich Becker
- Karl Heinrich Emil Becker
- Ernst Otto Beckmann
- Walter-Ulrich Behrens
- Gottfried Christoph Beireis
- Johann Benckiser
- Otto Berg
- Friedrich Bergius
- Alfred Bertheim
- Basilius Besler
- Heinrich Biltz
- Wilhelm Biltz
- Otto Saly Binswanger
- August Bischler
- Gustav Bischof
- Siegfried Blechert
- Victor Gustav Bloede
- Carl Blumenreuter
- Hans Bock
- Walter Bock
- Max Bockmühl
- Max Bodenstein
- Guido Bodländer
- Hanns-Peter Boehm
- Johann Böhm
- Horst Böhme
- Wilhelm Boland
- Werner von Bolton
- Karl Friedrich Bonhoeffer
- Hans-Joachim Born
- Carl Bosch
- Rudolf Christian Böttger
- Magnus von Braun
- Michael Braungart
- Holger Braunschweig
- Georg Bredig
- Julius Bredt
- Michael Buback
- Hans Theodor Bucherer
- Eduard Buchner
- Ernst Büchner
- Wilhelm Heinrich Sebastian Bucholz
- Robert Bunsen
- Adolf Butenandt

== C ==
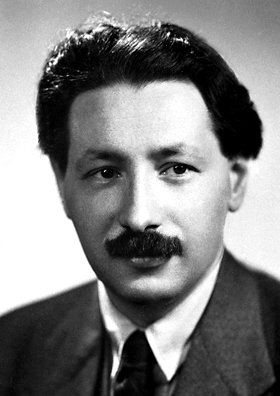
Ernst Boris Chain

- Georg Ludwig Carius
- Heinrich Caro
- Nikodem Caro
- Johann Friedrich Cartheuser
- Ernst Boris Chain
- Lorenz S. Cederbaum
- Rainer Ludwig Claisen
- Erich Clar
- Alexander Classen
- Adolf Karl Ludwig Claus
- Carl Friedrich Claus
- Klaus Clusius
- Lorenz Florenz Friedrich von Crell
- Erika Cremer
- Theodor Curtius

== D ==
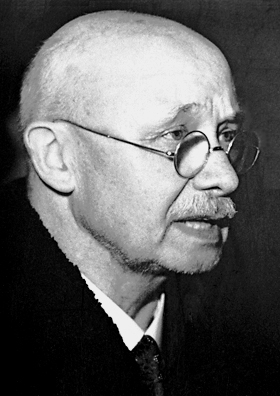
Otto Diels

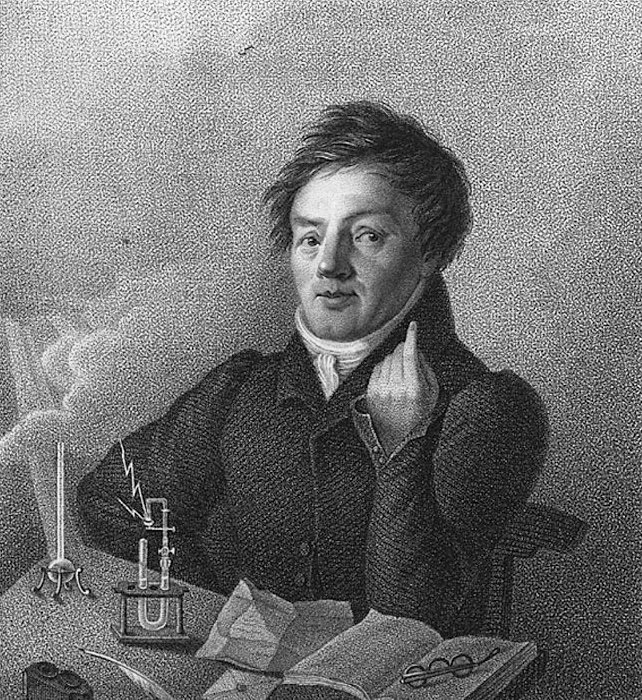
Johann Wolfgang Döbereiner

- Gerhard Damköhler
- Ludwig Darmstaedter
- Heinrich Debus
- Gero Decher
- Max Delbrück
- Friedrich Wilhelm Hermann Delffs
- Walter Dieckmann
- Otto Diels
- Geerd Diercksen
- Johann Wolfgang Döbereiner
- Manfred Donike
- Johann Georg Noel Dragendorff
- Heinrich Dreser
- Gottfried von Droste
- Adolph Ferdinand Duflos
- Carl Duisberg
- Friedrich Philipp Dulk
- August Dupré

== E ==
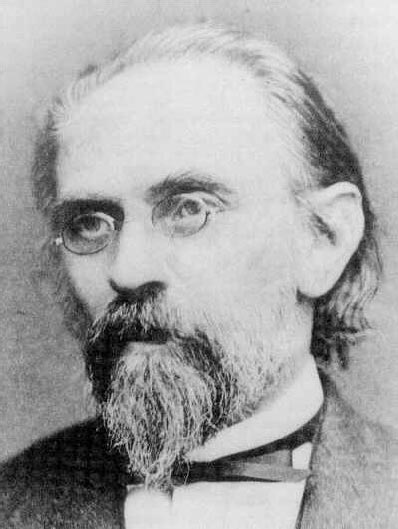
Emil Erlenmeyer

- Gustav Ehrhart
- Felix Ehrlich
- Arthur Eichengrün
- Manfred Eigen
- Alfred Einhorn
- Bernd Eistert
- Karl Elbs
- Alexander Ellinger
- Gustav Embden
- Adolph Emmerling
- Dieter Enders
- Karl Engler
- Otto Linné Erdmann
- Hugo Erdmann
- Charles F. Erhart
- Friedrich Gustav Carl Emil Erlenmeyer
- Emil Erlenmeyer
- Gerhard Ertl
- Arnold Eucken

== F ==
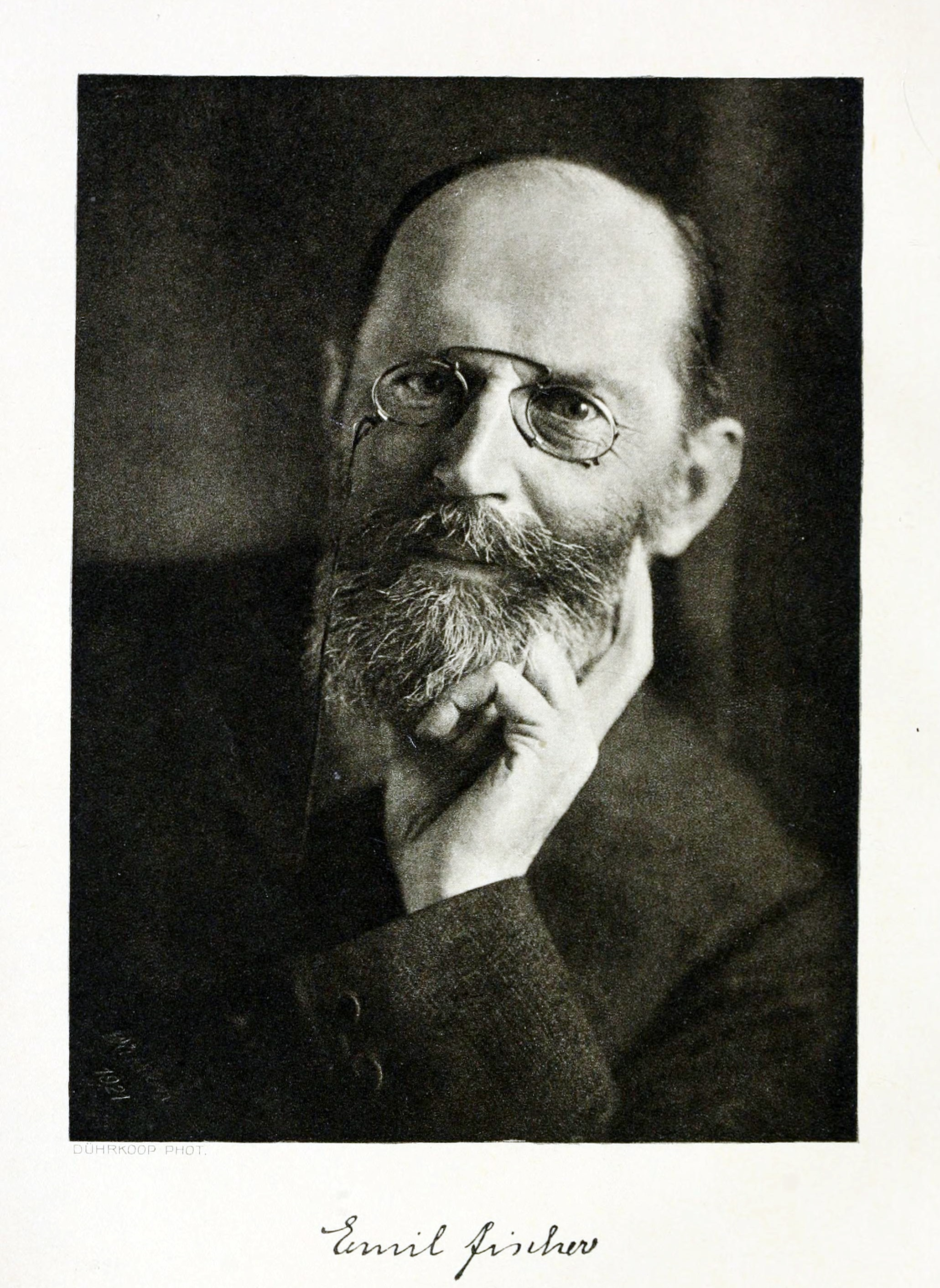
Emil Fischer

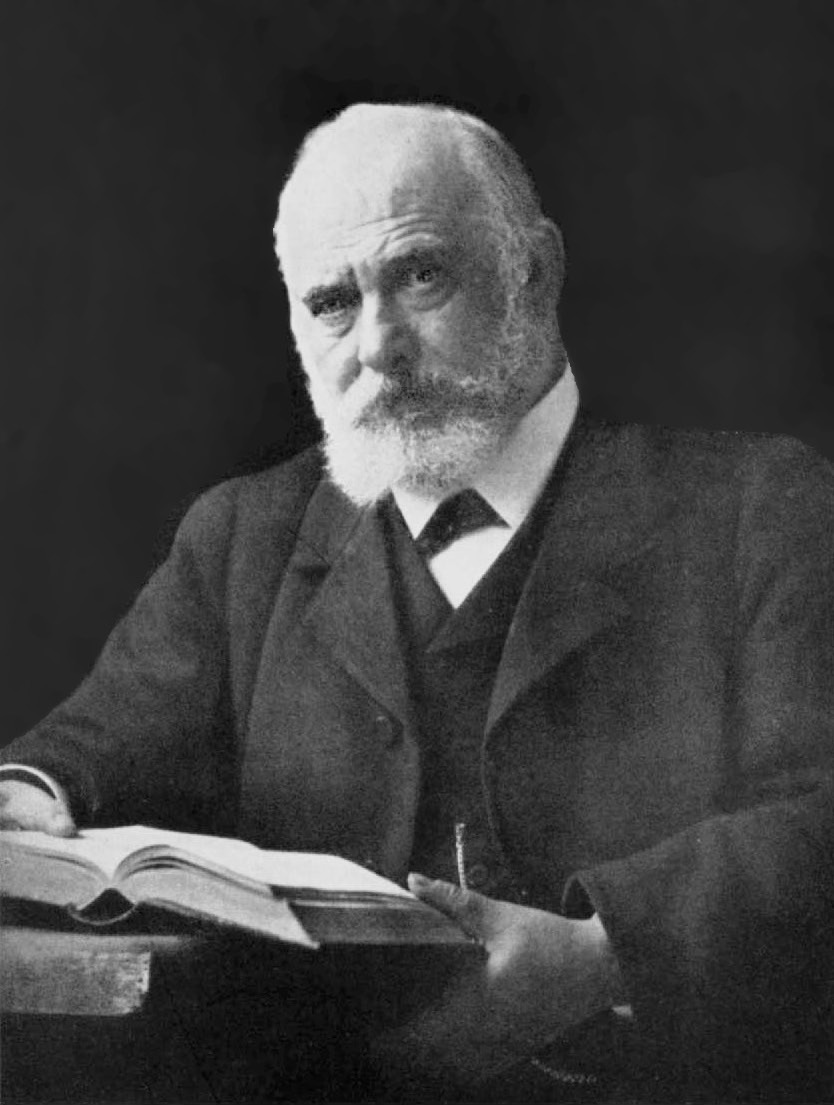
Rudolph Fittig

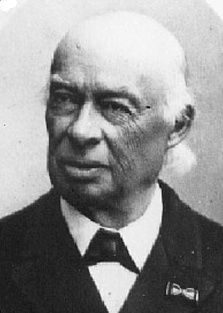
Carl Remigius Fresenius

- Constantin Fahlberg
- Marga Faulstich
- Hermann von Fehling
- Claudia Felser
- Dieter Fenske
- Erhard Fernholz
- Robert Feulgen
- Maximilian Fichtner
- Heino Finkelmann
- Hans Finkelstein
- Emil Fischer
- Ernst Gottfried Fischer
- Ernst Otto Fischer
- Franz Joseph Emil Fischer
- Hans Fischer
- Hermann Otto Laurenz Fischer
- Karl Fischer
- Nikolaus Wolfgang Fischer
- Wilhelm Rudolph Fittig
- Wilhelm Fleischmann
- Theodor Förster
- Jens Frahm
- Adolph Frank
- Herman Frasch
- Hans Freeman
- Max Fremery
- Friedrich August Frenzel
- Carl Remigius Fresenius
- Karl Freudenberg
- Herbert Freundlich
- Paul Friedländer
- Fritz Walter Paul Friedrichs
- Karl Theophil Fries
- Carl Julius Fritzsche
- August Sigmund Frobenius
- Johann Nepomuk von Fuchs

== G ==
Johann Rudolf Glauber

- Siegmund Gabriel
- Friedrich Gaedcke
- Johann Gasteiger
- Ludwig Gattermann
- Hieronymus David Gaubius
- Jürgen Gauß
- Adolph Ferdinand Gehlen
- Karl-Hermann Geib
- Philipp Lorenz Geiger
- Johann Gottlieb Georgi
- Heinz Gerischer
- Johann Georg Anton Geuther
- Gustav Giemsa
- Bernd Giese
- Friedrich Oskar Giesel
- Ludwig Wilhelm Gilbert
- Johann Rudolf Glauber
- Frank Glorius
- Jürgen Gmehling
- Christian Gmelin
- Leopold Gmelin
- Philipp Friedrich Gmelin
- Karl Christian Traugott Friedemann Goebel
- Oswald Helmuth Göhring
- Hans Goldschmidt
- Theodor Goldschmidt
- Eugen Freiherr von Gorup-Besanez
- Johann Friedrich August Göttling
- Josef Goubeau
- Carl Gräbe
- Michael Grätzel
- Friedrich Albrecht Carl Gren
- Peter Griess
- Rainer Grießhammer
- Aristid von Grosse
- Wilhelm Groth
- Theodor Grotthuss
- Hermann Julius Grüneberg
- Carl Gustav Guckelberger
- Rudolf Günsberg
- Klaus Günther

== H ==
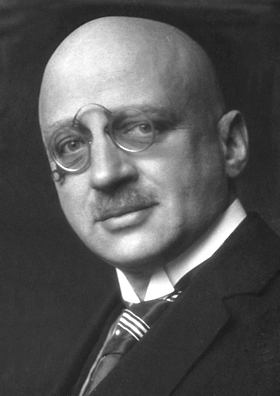
Fritz Haber

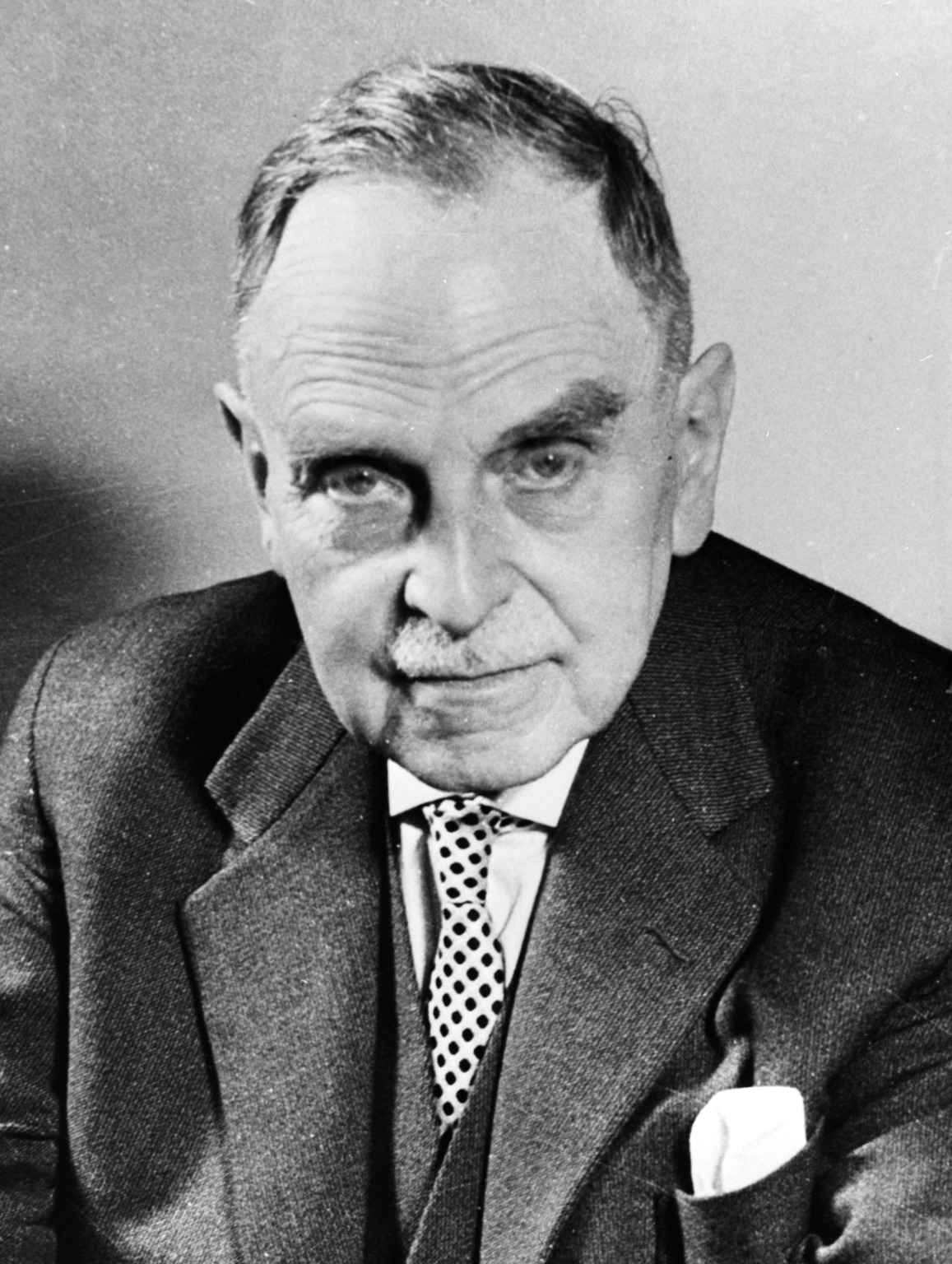
Otto Hahn

- Wilhelm Haarmann
- Fritz Haber
- Eugen de Haën
- Carl Hagemann
- Karl Gottfried Hagen
- Otto Hahn
- Georg Erhard Hamberger
- Michael Hanack
- Johann Ludwig Hannemann
- Arthur Rudolf Hantzsch
- Hans Harms
- Carl Harries
- Hermann Hartmann
- Johannes Hartmann
- Robert Havemann
- Stefan Hecht
- Friedrich Heeren
- Edgar Heilbronner
- Franz Hein
- Wilhelm Heinrich Heintz
- Axel C. Heitmann
- Burckhardt Helferich
- Carl Magnus von Hell
- Stefan Hell
- Hans Hellmann
- Hermann Hellriegel
- Wilhelm Henneberg
- Jürgen Hennig
- Karl Samuel Leberecht Hermann
- Sigismund Friedrich Hermbstädt
- Richard Herz
- Gerhard Herzberg
- Friedrich Heusler
- Evamarie Hey-Hawkins
- Walter Hieber
- Andreas Hierlemann
- Georg Friedrich Hildebrandt
- Albert Hilger
- William Francis Hillebrand
- Franz Hillenkamp
- Günther Hillmann
- Gustavus Detlef Hinrichs
- Oscar Hinsberg
- Felix Hoffmann
- August Wilhelm von Hofmann
- Fritz Hofmann
- Karl Andreas Hofmann
- Franz Hofmeister
- Felix Hoppe-Seyler
- Rudolf Hoppe
- Heinrich Hörlein
- Leopold Horner
- Josef Houben
- Hans Hübner
- Erich Hückel
- Gustav von Hüfner
- Rolf Huisgen
- Hermann Hummel
- Klaus-Dieter Hungenberg
- Heinz Hunsdiecker
- Erich Huzenlaub

== I ==
- Clara Immerwahr
- Junes Ipaktschi

== J ==
- Gerhart Jander
- Joachim Jose
- Johann Juncker
- Alexander Just

== K ==
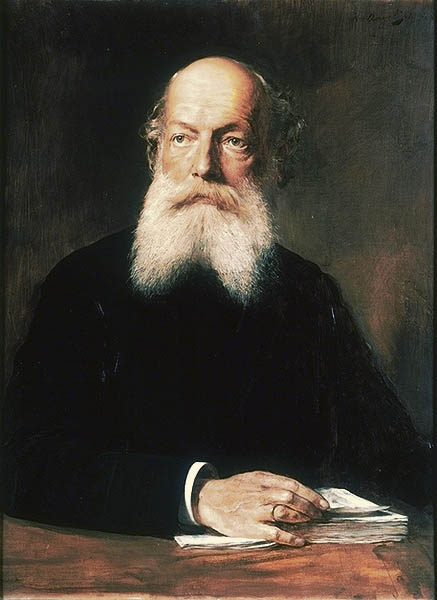
August Kekulé

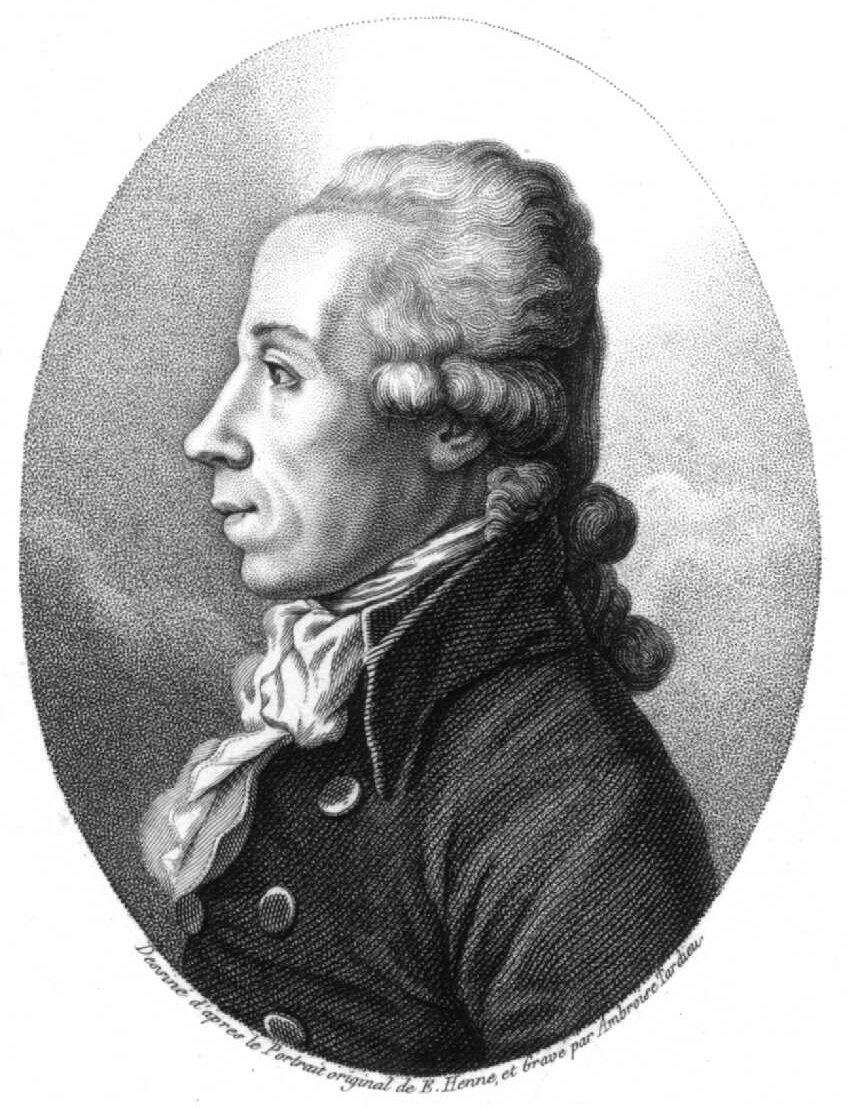
Martin Heinrich Klaproth

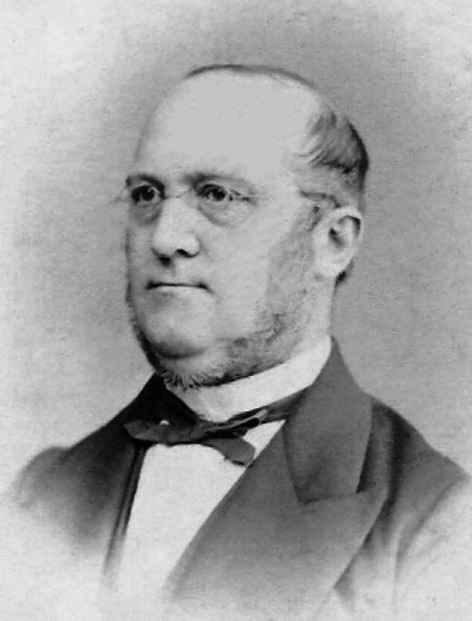
Hermann Kolbe

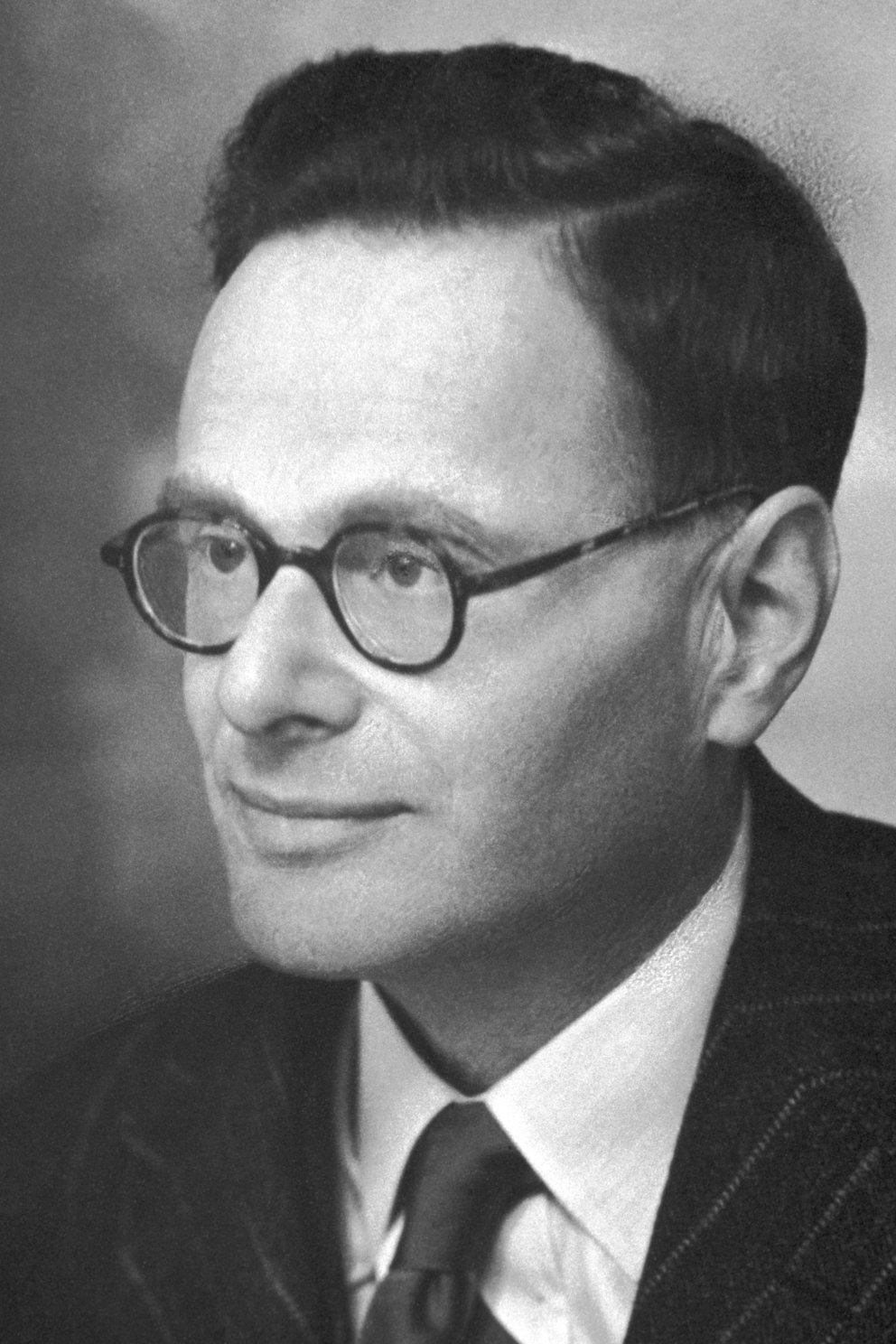
Hans Adolf Krebs

- Wolfgang Kaim
- Kajetan Georg von Kaiser
- Helmut Kallmeyer
- Walter Kaminsky
- Ellen Kandeler
- Michael Karas
- Olaf Karthaus
- Emanuel Kaspar
- Karl Wilhelm Gottlob Kastner
- Wilhelm Keim
- August Kekulé
- Bernhard Keppler
- Klaus Kern
- Werner Kern
- Thomas M. Klapötke
- Martin Heinrich Klaproth
- Fritz Klatte
- Friedrich Ludwig Knapp
- Friedrich Knauer
- Emil Knoevenagel
- Wilhelm Knop
- Ludwig Knorr
- Julius Arnold Koch
- Christoph Kohl
- Hermann Kolbe
- Anton Köllisch
- Joseph König
- Hermann Franz Moritz Kopp
- Wilhelm Körner
- Oskar Korschelt
- Friedrich Krafft
- Philip Kraft
- Karl-Ludwig Kratz
- Georg Ludwig Engelhard Krebs
- Hans Adolf Krebs
- Heinrich Ludwig Hermann Krekeler
- August Krönig
- Gerhard Krüss
- Jochen Küpper
- Johannes Sibertus Kuffler
- Franz Xaver Kugler
- Hans Kühne

== L ==
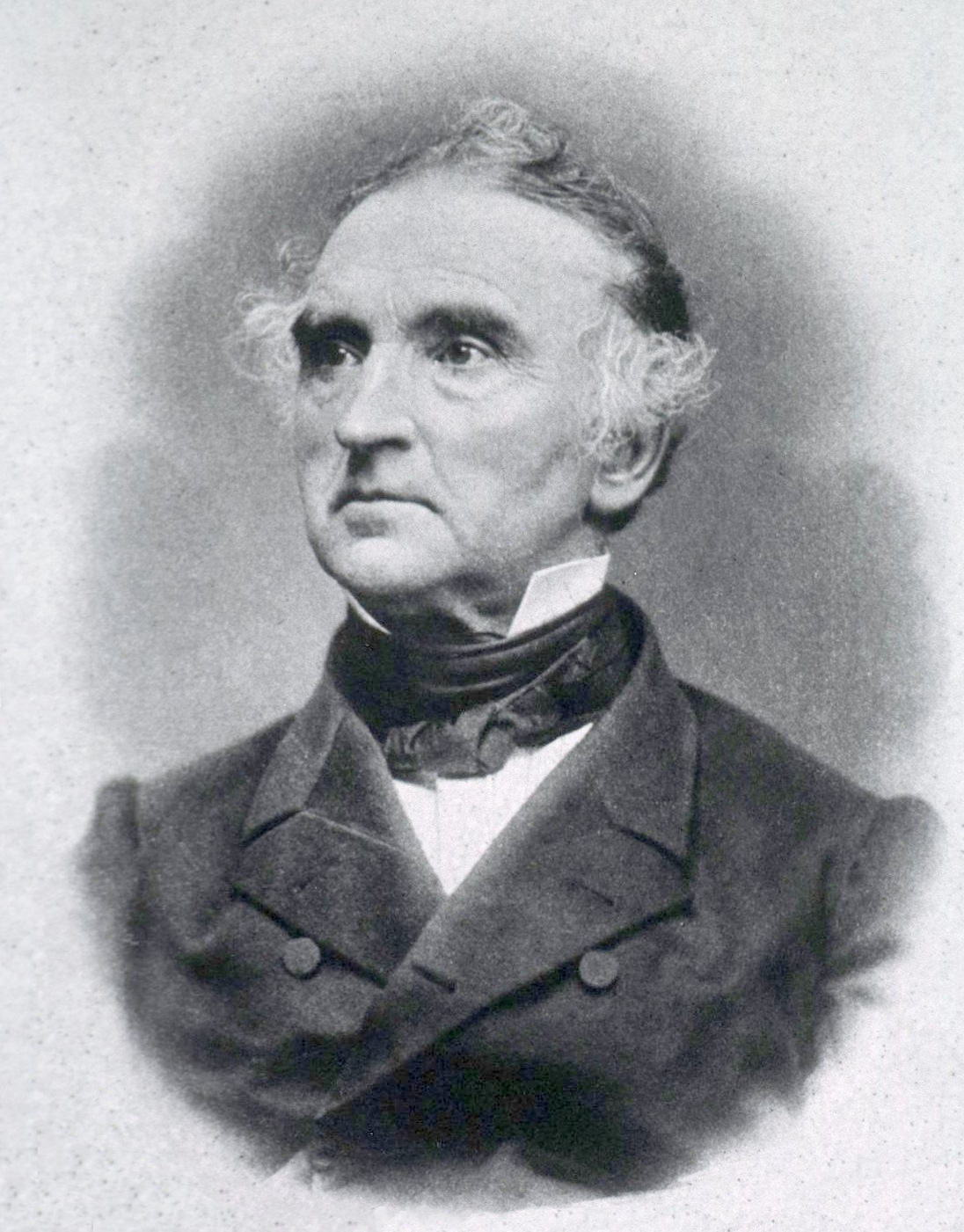
Justus von Liebig

- Conrad Laar
- Albert Ladenburg
- Gerhard Lagaly
- Wilhelm August Lampadius
- Augustin Gottfried Ludwig Lentin
- Johann Gottfried Leonhardi
- Hermann Leuchs
- Rudolf Leuckart
- Carl Leverkus
- Julius Lewkowitsch
- Andreas Libavius
- Carl Theodore Liebermann
- Justus von Liebig
- Benjamin List
- Raphael Eduard Liesegang
- Heinrich Limpricht
- Eduard Linnemann
- Edmund Oscar von Lippmann
- Georg Lockemann
- Oscar Loew
- Lotte Loewe
- Wilhelm Lossen
- Carl Jacob Löwig
- Georg Lunge
- Paul Luther
- Hermann Lux

== M ==
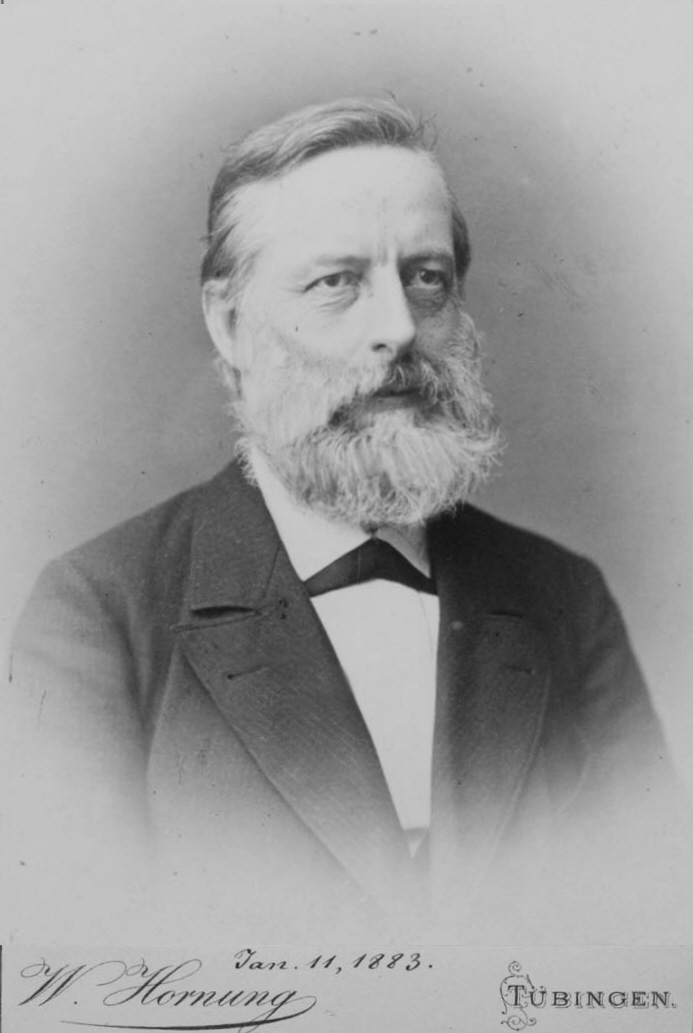
Julius Lothar Meyer

- Heinrich Gustav Magnus
- Joachim Maier
- Christoph Mangold
- Carl Mannich
- Richard Felix Marchand
- Willy Marckwald
- Andreas Sigismund Marggraf
- Ludwig Clamor Marquart
- Dieter Mecke
- Edmund ter Meer
- Fritz ter Meer
- Hans Meerwein
- Uwe Meierhenrich
- Jakob Meisenheimer
- Paul Mendelssohn Bartholdy
- Rudolf Mentzel
- Louis Merck
- Angela Merkel
- John Theodore Merz
- Kurt Heinrich Meyer
- Julius Lothar Meyer
- Viktor Meyer
- Wilhelm Meyerhoffer
- August Michaelis
- Leonor Michaelis
- Maria-Elisabeth Michel-Beyerle
- Wilhelm Michler
- Adolf Miethe
- Alexander Mitscherlich
- Eilhard Mitscherlich
- Alwin Mittasch
- Karl Friedrich Mohr
- Ludwig Mond
- Rainer Moormann
- Johann Moriaen
- Brigitte Mühlenbruch
- Richard Müller
- Johann Mulzer
- Ferdinand Münz

== N ==
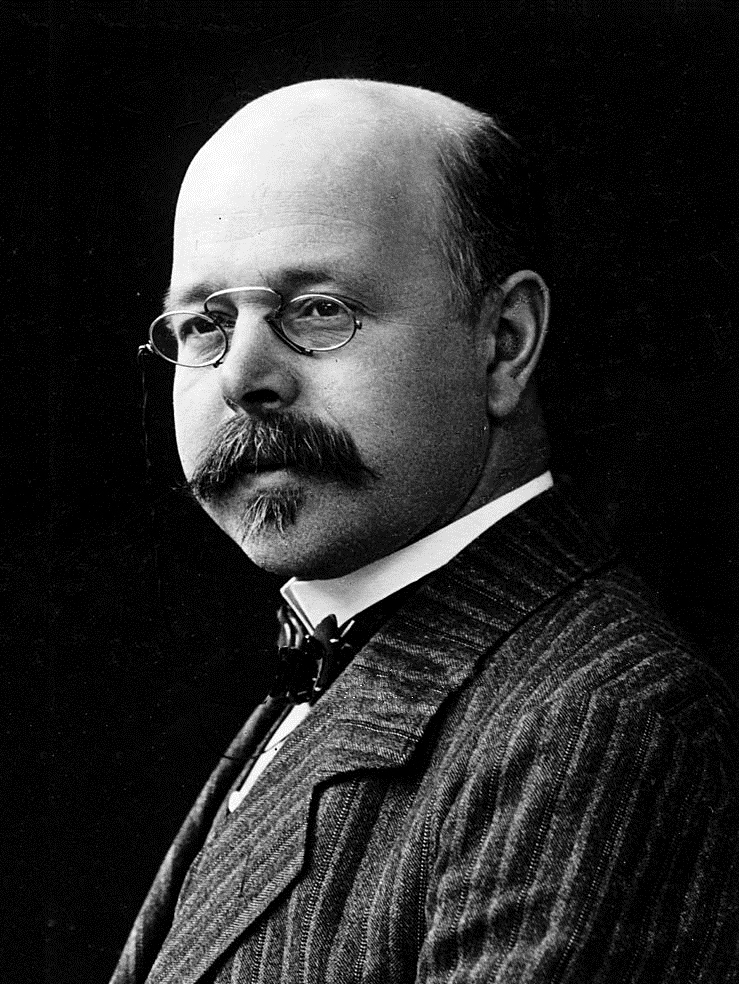
Walther Nernst

- Frank Neese
- Walther Nernst
- Julius Neßler
- Ernst Anton Nicolai
- Gereon Niedner-Schatteburg
- Albert Niemann
- Rudolf Nietzki
- Ida Noddack
- Walter Noddack
- Wilhelm Normann

== O ==
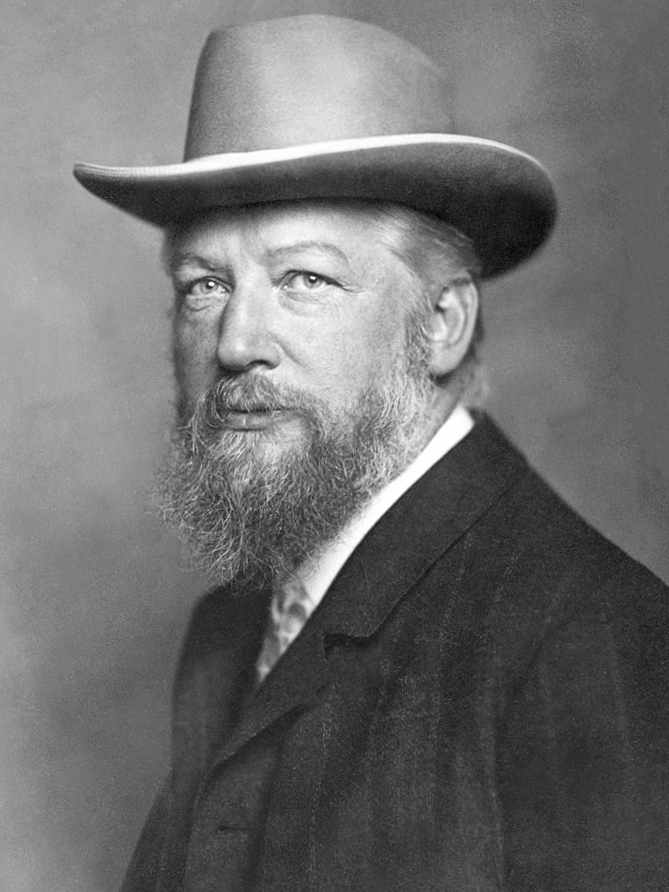
Wilhelm Wolfgang Ostwald

- Heribert Offermanns
- Günther Ohloff
- Alfred Oppenheim
- Gottfried Osann
- Heinrich Oster
- Wilhelm Ostwald
- Wolfgang Ostwald

== P ==
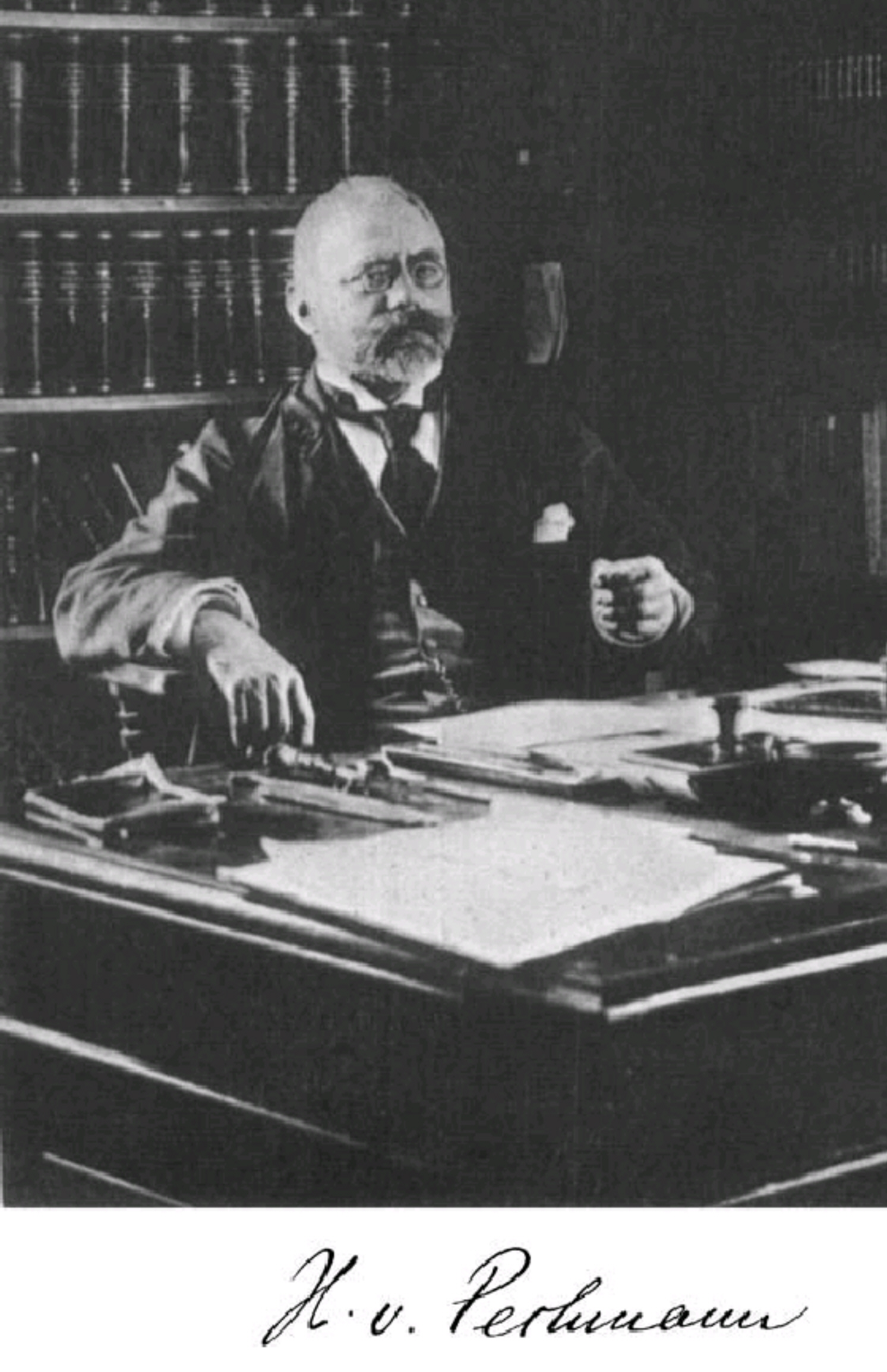
Hans von Pechmann

- Hermann Pauly
- Hans von Pechmann
- Otto Perutz
- Kurt Peters
- Norbert Peters
- Frauke Petry
- Max Joseph von Pettenkofer
- Sigrid D. Peyerimhoff
- Christoph Heinrich Pfaff
- Paul Pfeiffer
- Charles Pfizer
- Rainer Philippson
- Oskar Piloty
- Adolf Pinner
- Eugen Piwowarsky
- Karl Friedrich Plattner
- Agnes Pockels
- John Polanyi
- Theodor Poleck
- Klaus Praefcke
- Horst Prinzbach
- Bernhard Proskauer
- Lotte Pusch

== R ==
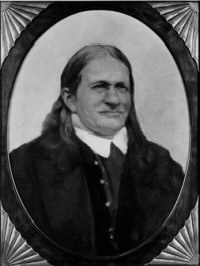
Friedlieb Ferdinand Runge

- Karl Friedrich August Rammelsberg
- Friedrich Raschig
- Gerhard Raspé
- Rudolf Erich Raspe
- Friedrich Rathgen
- Bernhard Rathke
- Ferdinand Reich
- Carl Reichenbach
- Hans-Ulrich Reissig
- Walter Reppe
- Hieronymous Theodor Richter
- Jeremias Benjamin Richter
- Victor von Richter
- Alfred Rieche
- Nikolaus Riehl
- Ernst Hermann Riesenfeld
- Helmut Ringsdorf
- Otto Roelen
- Werner Rolfinck
- Heinrich Rose
- Kai Rossen
- Valentin Rose the Elder
- Karl Wilhelm Rosenmund
- Germar Rudolf
- Otto Ruff
- Leopold Rügheimer
- Friedlieb Ferdinand Runge

== S ==
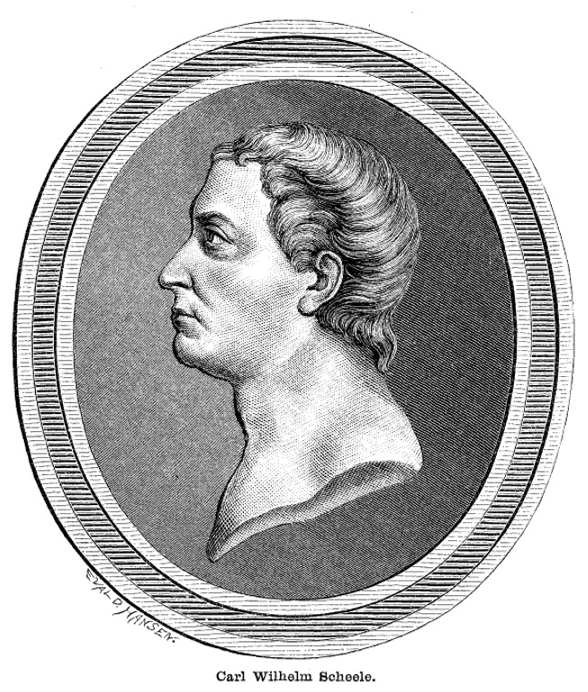
Carl Wilhelm Scheele

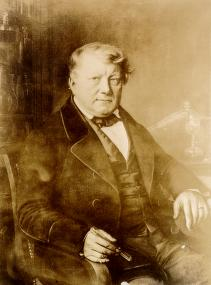
Christian Friedrich Schönbein

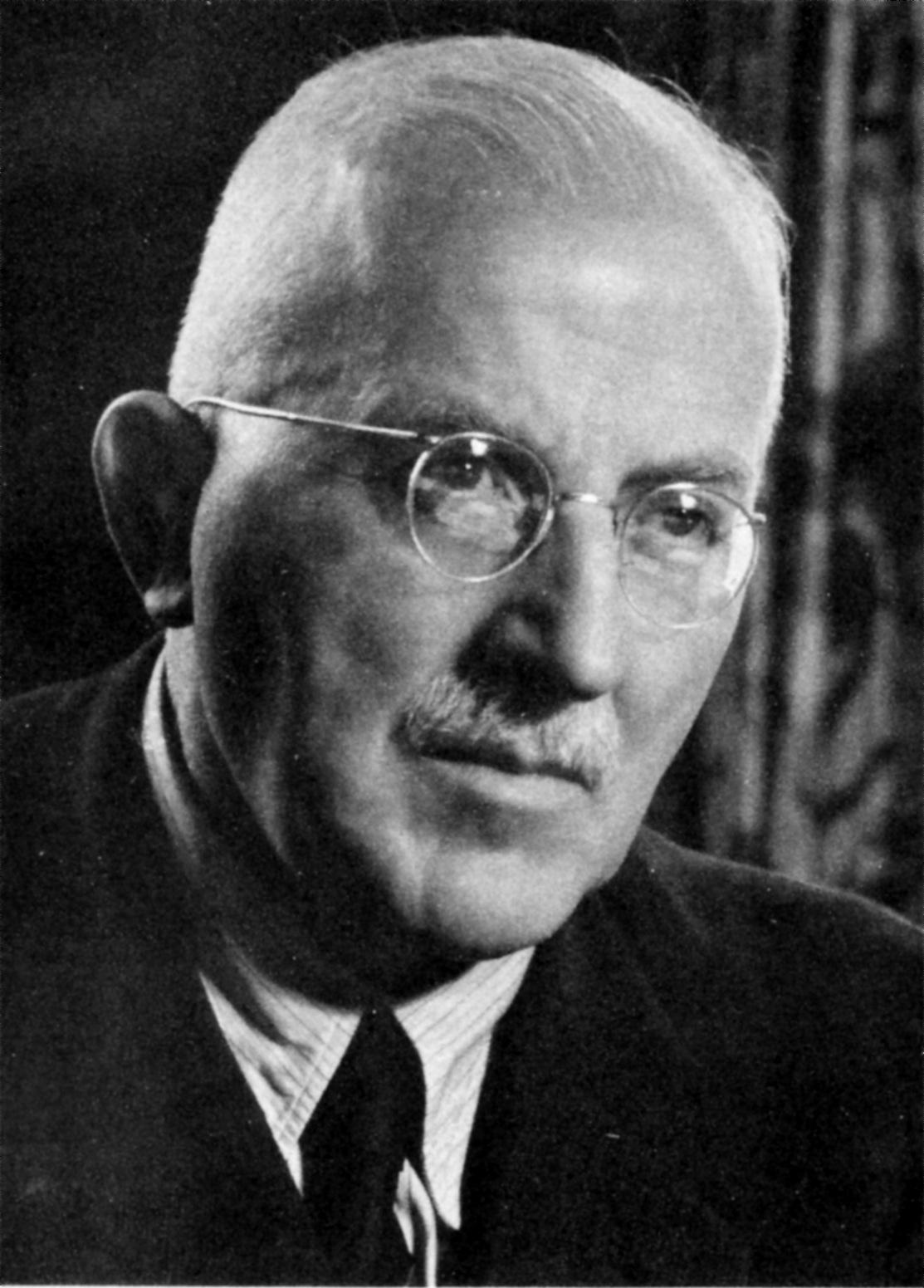
Hermann Staudinger

- George Sachs
- Otto Sackur
- Reiner Salzer
- Joachim Sauer
- Karl Schaum
- Carl Wilhelm Scheele
- Carl Scheibler
- Alexander Nicolaus Scherer
- Johann Joseph Scherer
- Friedrich Schickendantz
- Hugo Schiff
- Robert Schiff
- Michael Schmittel
- Paul Schlack
- Wilhelm Schlenk
- Carl Schmidt
- Gerhard Carl Schmidt
- Paul Felix Schmidt
- Oswald Schmiedeberg
- Rudolf Schmitt
- Christian Schneider
- Ferdinand Schneider
- Ulrich Schöllkopf
- Christian Friedrich Schönbein
- Carl Schorlemmer
- Otto Schott
- Carl Schotten
- Bernhard Schrader
- Gerhard Schrader
- Johann Schröder
- Heinrich G. F. Schröder
- Wilhelm Schuler
- Hugo Paul Friedrich Schulz
- Ferdi Schüth
- Helmut Schwarz
- Hans-Adalbert Schweigart
- Franz Wilhelm Schweigger-Seidel
- Johann Schweigger
- Peter Schwerdtfeger
- Dieter Seebach
- Peter Seeberger
- Stefan Seeger
- Ephraim Seehl
- Joachim Seelig
- Walter Seelmann-Eggebert
- Friedrich Wilhelm Semmler
- Daniel Sennert
- Konrad Seppelt
- Friedrich Sertürner
- Karl Seubert
- Adolf Sieverts
- Eduard Simon
- Kornelia Smalla
- Franz Leopold Sonnenschein
- Franz von Soxhlet
- Harald Specht
- Max Speter
- Karl Spiro
- Hertha Sponer
- Hermann Sprengel
- Heinz Staab
- Adolf Stachel
- Georg Städeler
- Georg Ernst Stahl
- Kurt Starke
- Hermann Staudinger
- Magda Staudinger
- Wolfgang Steglich
- Christoph Steinbeck
- Wilhelm Steinkopf
- Hugo Stintzing
- Alfred Stock
- Julius Adolph Stöckhardt
- Friedrich Stohmann
- Hugo Stoltzenberg
- Friedrich Stolz
- Fritz Strassmann
- Adolph Strecker
- Friedrich Stromeyer
- Hildegard Stücklen

== T ==
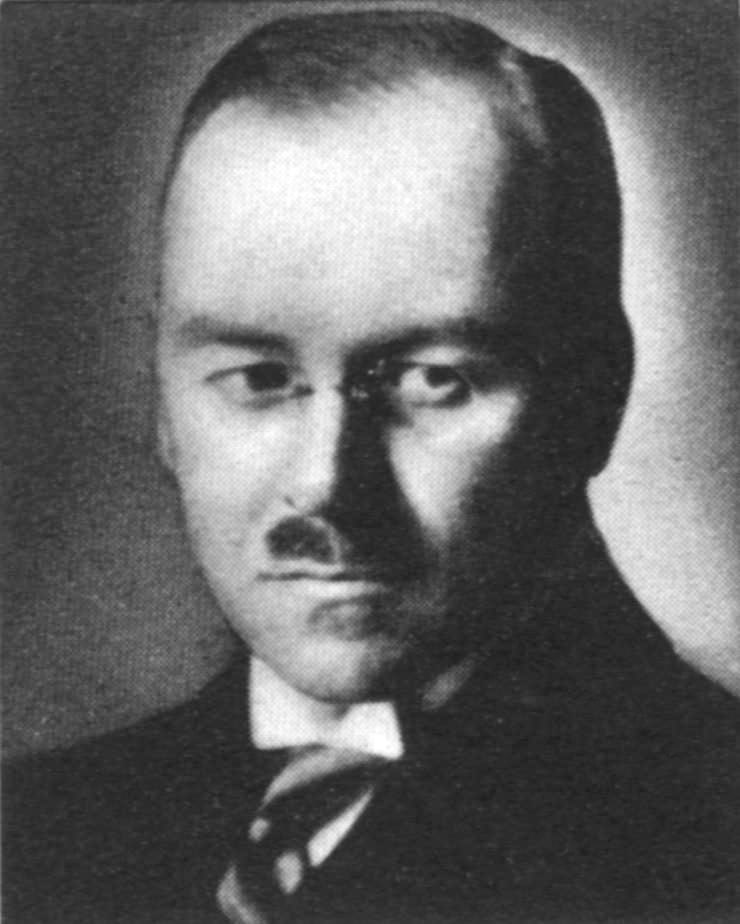
Hans Tropsch

- Gustav Heinrich Tammann
- Stephan Tanneberger
- Hermann von Tappeiner
- Bruno Tesch
- William Theilheimer
- Walter Thiel
- Johannes Thiele
- Peter Adolf Thiessen
- Ferdinand Tiemann
- Werner Tochtermann
- Bernhard Tollens
- Moritz Traube
- Wilhelm Traube
- Alfred E. Treibs
- Julius Tröger
- Johann Trommsdorff
- Hans Tropsch
- Otto Tunmann

== U ==
- Leo Ubbelohde
- Ivar Karl Ugi
- Fritz Ullmann
- Otto Unverdorben
- Werner Urland

== V ==
- Tina van de Flierdt
- Victor Villiger
- Anton Vilsmeier
- Augustus Voelcker
- Hermann Wilhelm Vogel
- Brigitte Voit
- Jacob Volhard
- Max Volmer
- Daniel Vorländer
- Julius Vorster

== W ==
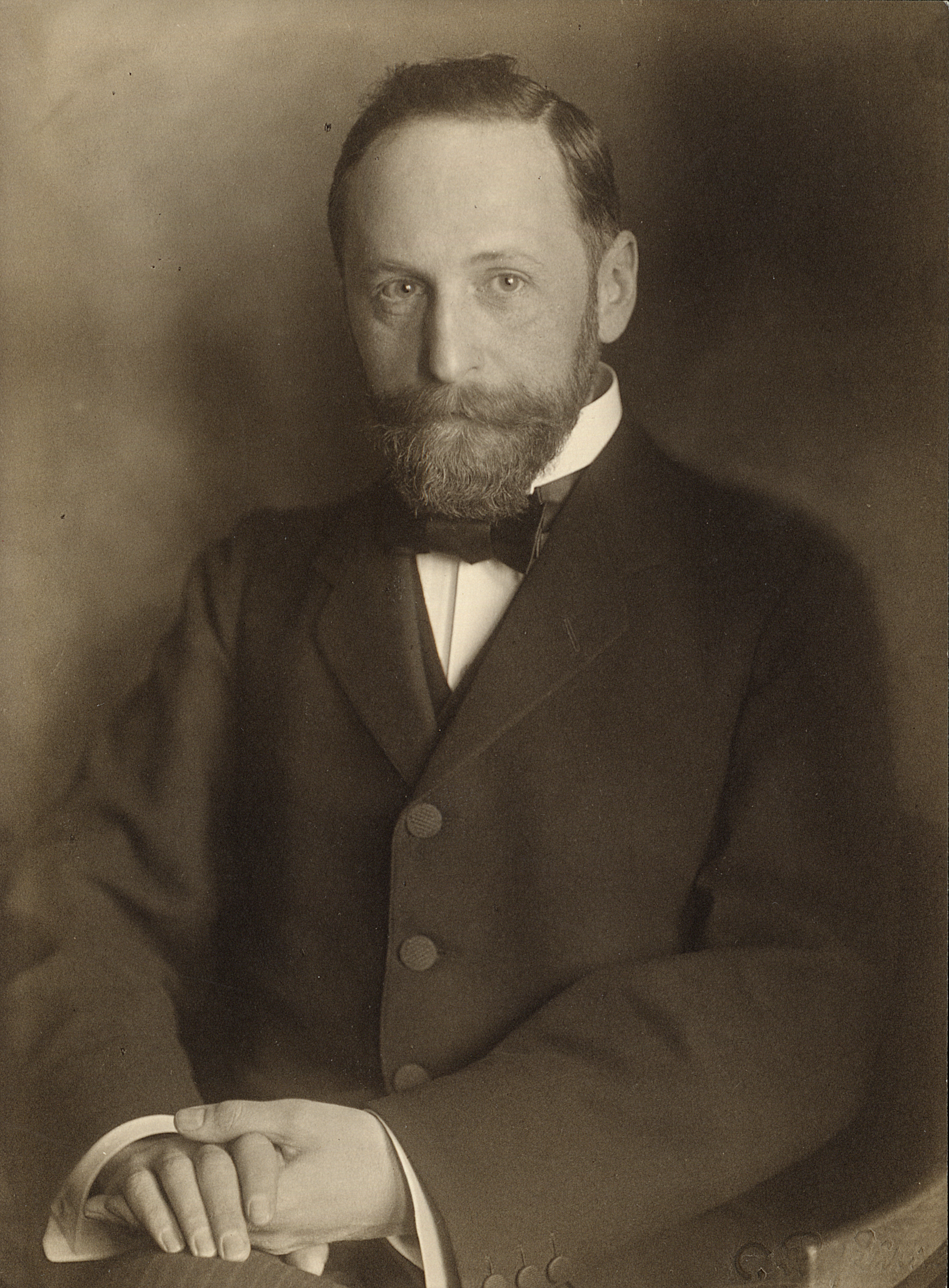
Richard Willstätter

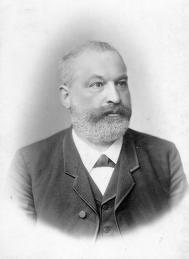
Clemens Winkler

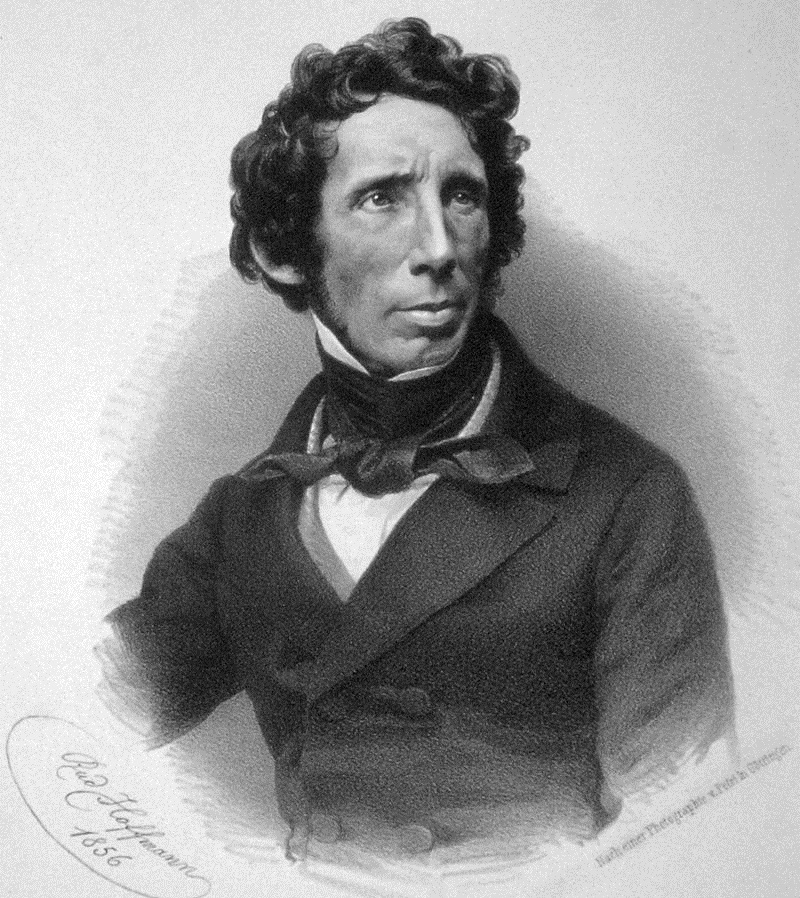
Friedrich Wöhler

- Günter Wächtershäuser
- Heinrich Wilhelm Ferdinand Wackenroder
- Carl Wagner
- Friedrich Walchner
- Paul Walden
- Otto Wallach
- Hans-Werner Wanzlick
- Carl Warburg
- Rainer Waser
- Peter Wasserscheid
- Georg Wolfgang Wedel
- Johann Adolph Wedel
- Gerd Wedler
- Carl Wehmer
- Christian Ehrenfried Weigel
- Fritz Weigert
- Arthur von Weinberg
- Adolf Ferdinand Weinhold
- Rudolf Friedrich Weinland
- Armin Weiss
- Karl Weltzien
- Carl Friedrich Wenzel
- Gustav Werther
- Conrad Weygand
- Theodor Weyl
- Hermann Weyland
- Peter P. von Weymarn
- Hermann Wichelhaus
- Albert Widmann
- Johann Christian Wiegleb
- Georg Wiegner
- Heinrich Otto Wieland
- Heinrich August Ludwig Wiggers
- Julius Wilbrand
- Ludwig Wilhelmy
- Günther Wilke
- Conrad Willgerodt
- Richard Willstätter
- Adolf Windaus
- Clemens Winkler
- Martin Winter
- Robert Wintgen
- Günter Wirths
- Johannes Wislicenus
- Bernhard Witkop
- Georg Wittig
- Georg Christian Wittstein
- Alfred Wohl
- Friedrich Wöhler
- Ludwig Wolff
- Richard Wolffenstein
- Carl Wurster

== Z ==
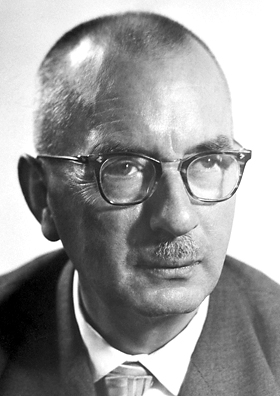
Karl Ziegler

- Helmut Zahn
- Werner Zerweck
- Karl Ziegler
- Theodor Zincke
- Eduard Zintl
- Georg Zundel
- Johann Zwelfer

== See also ==
- List of chemists
- List of German inventions and discoveries
- Science and technology in Germany
