= Specht =

Specht is a German and Dutch surname meaning "woodpecker". Notable people with the surname include:

- August Specht (1849–1923), German natural history painter
- Bobby Specht (1921–1999), U.S. figure skater
- Doug Specht (1942–2025), Canadian football player
- Eckehard Specht (born 1953), German chemical engineering professor and thermodynamics expert
- Günther Specht (1914–1945), German fighter ace in the Luftwaffe during World War II
- Harald Specht (born 1951), German scientist and author, mainly known for his books about Jesus of Nazareth and early Christianity
- Harry Specht (1929–1995), U.S. social worker, author, and dean (1977-1995) of the University of California, Berkeley School of Social Welfare
- Johann Georg Specht (1721–1803), German civil engineer and architect
- Karl-Wilhelm Specht (1894–1953), German infantry general during World War II
- Léonard Specht (born 1954), French professional football player
- Liz Specht, U.S. research scientist specializing in chemical engineering and synthetic biology
- Lotte Specht (1911–2002), German female football pioneer
- Michele Specht (born 1973), U.S. actress, comedian, and voice actress
- Minna Specht (1879–1961), German educator, socialist, and an advocate of German resistance to Nazism
- Paul Specht (1895–1954), U.S. musician and dance-band leader
- Raymond Specht (1924–2021), Australian plant ecologist, conservationist and academic
- Richard Specht (1870–1932), Austrian lyricist, dramatist, musicologist, and writer
- Sybille Specht (born 1970), mezzo-soprano
- Wilhelm Specht (1907–1985), German mathematician
