= Meierhenrich =

Meierhenrich is a surname. Notable people with the surname include:

- Uwe Meierhenrich (born 1967), German chemist
- Jens Meierhenrich, scholar of law and international relations
- Nova Meierhenrich (born 1973), German television presenter and actress

== See also ==
- Meierhenry
