= Meierhenry =

Meierhenry is a surname. Notable people with the surname include:

- Judith Meierhenry (born 1944), American lawyer and judge
- Mark V. Meierhenry (1944–2020), American attorney

== See also ==
- Meierhenrich
