= Otto Tunmann =

German pharmacologist (1867–1919)

Otto Tunmann (13 August 1867, Posen – 11 September 1919, Innsbruck) was a German pharmacologist and phytochemist.

He studied pharmacy at the Universities of Leipzig and Erlangen, obtaining his doctorate in 1900 from the University of Bern. Afterwards, he worked as a pharmacist in Schöneck, Vogtland. From 1905 he was an assistant to Alexander Tschirch at Bern, where he conducted studies in the fields of phytomicrochemistry, microchemical toxicology and forensic chemistry. In May 1919, Tunmann was appointed professor of pharmacognosy at the University of Vienna. He died in Innsbruck, Austria a few months later.

In 1915 Tunmann isolated from the leaves of hyssop, a substance he referred to as "hyssopin".

== Selected publications ==
- Über die Sekretdrüsen, 1900 - On glandular secretions (dissertation).
- Mikroskopisch-pharmakognostische Beiträge zur Kenntnis einiger neuerer Arzneidrogen, 1908 - Microscopic-pharmacognostic contributions to the knowledge of some recent medicinal drugs.
- Zur Mikrochemie des Inulins, 1910 - On the microchemistry of inulins.
- Der Drogenhandel Hamburgs, 1910 Digital edition by the University and State Library Düsseldorf
- Beiträge zur angewandten Pflanzenmikrochemie - Volumes 1-2, 1911 - Contributions to applied plant microchemistry.
- Pflanzenmikrochemie: ein Hilfsbuch beim mikrochemischen Studium pflanzlicher Objekte 1913 - Botanical microchemistry: a manual for micro-chemical studies of plants. Digital edition by the University and State Library Düsseldorf
