= Siegfried Blechert =

German chemist (born 1946)

Siegfried Blechert (born 1 March 1946 in Aalborg, Denmark) is a German chemist.

Blechert studied chemistry at the University of Hannover, Germany and completed his PhD under the supervision of Ekkehard Winterfeldt in 1974. After a research stay with Pierre Potier in Gif-sur-Yvette, France, in 1981, he finished his habilitation at the University of Hannover in 1982 and there became lecturer in organic chemistry. In 1986 he took up a professorship at the University of Bonn. In 1990 he accepted the chair of the Organic Chemistry Department at Technische Universität Berlin.

His research interests include the development of new catalysts for olefin metathesis, novel synthetic methods, and the stereoselective synthesis of natural products.
