= Junes Ipaktschi =

Iranian chemist (born 1940)

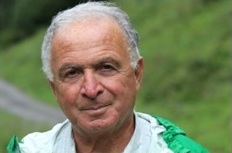
Junes Ipaktschi (2015)

Junes Ipaktschi (born October 25, 1940, in Tabriz, Iran) is an Iranian organic chemist and professor of the Department of Organic Chemistry at the University of Giessen.

== Life ==
Junes Ipaktschi grew up in Tehran / Iran. After graduation in June 1958 at the Razi School in Tehran, he studied chemistry from 1958 to 1966 at the Heidelberg University. His doctoral thesis dealt with the field of Organic Chemistry under the direction of Heinz Staab. He then conducted research as an assistant in the same working group and habilitated in 1972 for the Organic Chemistry with a thesis on the photochemistry of unsaturated ketones. From 1972 to 1974 he did research as a postdoctoral fellow and visiting professor in the laboratory of William G. Dauben at the University of California, Berkeley. In 1973 he accepted an appointment at the Department of Chemistry at the University of Marburg and became a professor. In 1975 he was at the chemical Institute of Arya Mehr University (now Sharif University) appointed to Tehran and joined as a professor in his native country, Iran. In 1978 he moved to the newly founded Reza Shah Kabir University (now Mazandaran University) and worked there as a professor for chemistry. He was for a time as director of the University and also head of the Chemical Institute operates. From 1980 until retirement, in 2005, he was professor of chemistry at the University of Giessen. 1992–1995 he was dean of the chemistry department of the University and 2001–2002 executive director of the Organic Chemical Institute there. In addition to several visits as a visiting professor at various universities in Iran, he was invited in 2001 as a visiting professor at the National Institute of Advanced Industrial Science and Technology, Tsukuba / Japan and spent three months there. In 1999, Ipaktschi was awarded the Kharazmi Award.

== Research ==
Ipaktschi is known for the use of ethereal solutions of lithium perchlorate as a medium for organic reactions and organometallic chemistry.

=== Selected publications ===
- J. Ipaktschi, M. R. Saidi: Metal-Mediated Cyclizations of Amines, Science of synthesis 2012, 40.1.1.5.5, p. 351–504.
- Ipaktschi, Junes; Halimehjani, Azim Ziyaei; Saidi, Mohammad R. (8 December 2006). "Investigation of the Reaction of Allyl(cyclopentadienyl)iron(II) Dicarbonyl with Iminium Salts: Synthesis of Ammonium Salts of Substituted Five-Membered-Ring Iron Complexes". Organometallics. 26 (1). American Chemical Society (ACS): 201–203. doi:10.1021/om060783i. ISSN 0276-7333.
- Ipaktschi, Junes; Uhlig, Sascha; Dülmer, Ansgar (11 October 2001). "η2-Alkynyl and Vinylidene Transition Metal Complexes. 7.1 Hydroamination of Neutral Tungsten−Vinylidene Complexes". Organometallics. 20 (23). American Chemical Society (ACS): 4840–4846. doi:10.1021/om010528s. ISSN 0276-7333.
- Ipaktschi, Junes; Hosseinzadeh, Rahman; Schlaf, Peter; Dreiseidler, Erhard; Goddard, Richard (7 October 1998). "Selbstorganisation von Molekülen über kovalente Bindungen: Selektive Tetramerisierung einesp-Chinodimethans". Helvetica Chimica Acta. 81 (10). Wiley: 1821–1834. doi:10.1002/(sici)1522-2675(19981007)81:10<1821::aid-hlca1821>3.0.co;2-c. ISSN 0018-019X.
