= Carl Blumenreuter =

German chemist, SS Chief Pharmacist, SS-Gruppenführer (1881–1969)

- Born: 16 November 1881; Berlin, German Empire
- Died: 7 November 1969 (aged 87); Neustadt, West Germany
- Military career
- Allegiance: Nazi Germany
- Branch: Waffen-SS
- Service years: 1914–1945
- Rank: SS-Gruppenführer

Carl Blumenreuter (16 November 1881 – 11 July 1969) was a German chemist and politician during the Nazi era. He served as SS Chief Pharmacist for the Nazi Party (NSDAP).

Blumenreuter studied the Nahrungsmittelchemie. He received special training in World War I for gas warfare at the Kaiser Wilhelm Institute for physical chemistry and electrochemistry in Berlin. In 1935 he joined the paramilitary organization of the Nazi Party, the Sturmabteilung (SA), and in 1937 the Nazi Party.

In 1936, he was in the Sanitätsabteilung of the SS-Totenkopfverbände (SS-TV) and built up the Sanitätsversorgung. In 1937, he was head of the chemical pharmacological service of the SS Sanitätsamtes. Most recently, he was promoted to SS-Gruppenführer. In August 1943, the department was placed under the Reich physician SS and he received the title of Sanitätszeugmeister. This agency supplied the concentration camps with poisons. After World War II in Europe ended, he was interned. Blumenreuter was released but already in 1946 from the Neuengamme camp again. He then lived in Grömitz in Holstein and afterwards led a hospital pharmacy.
