= Heinrich Ludwig Hermann Krekeler =

German diplomat (1906–2003)

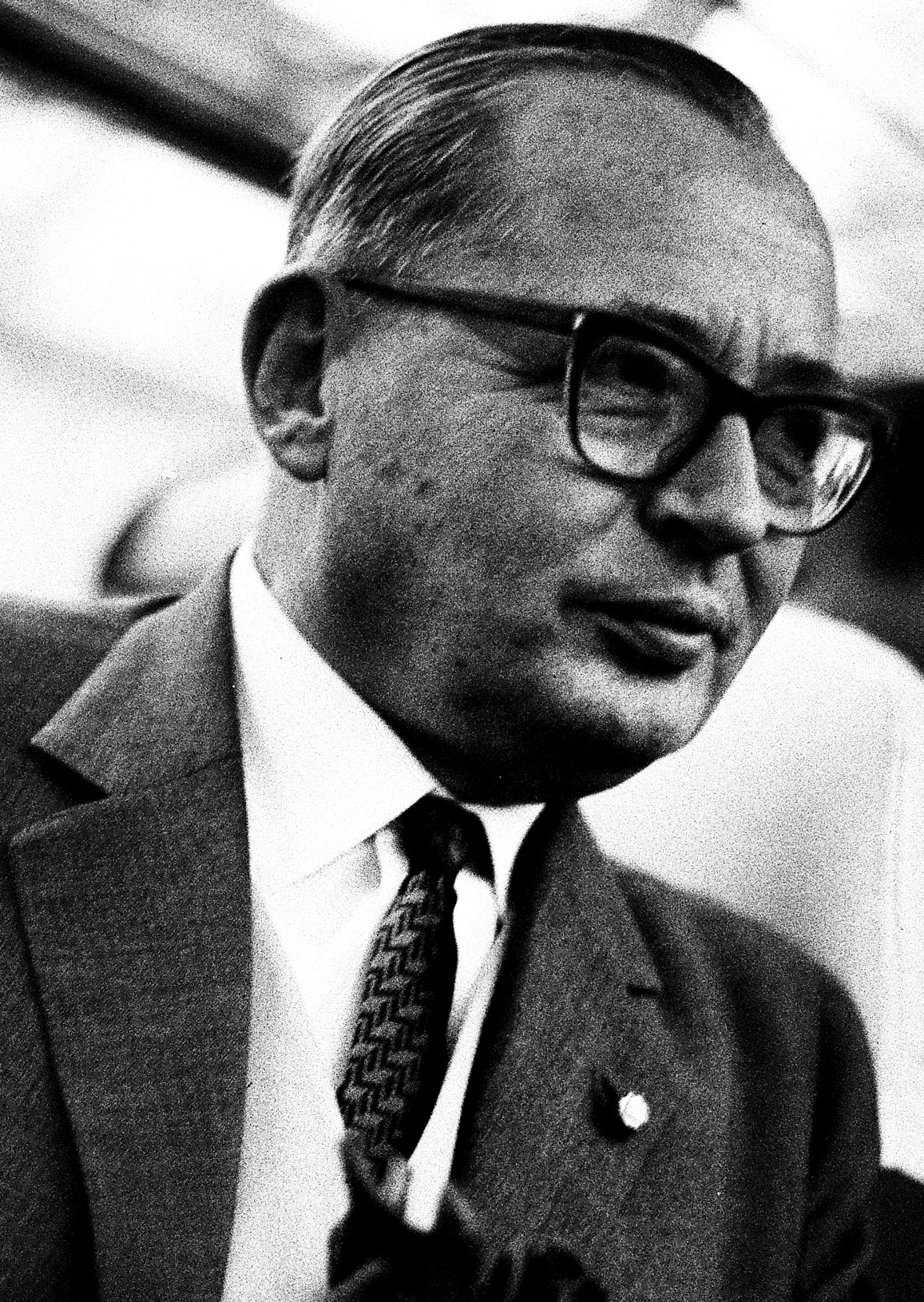
Heinz Krekeler in 1963

Heinrich Ludwig Hermann Krekeler (20 July 1906 in Bottrop – 5 August 2003 in Bad Salzuflen) was a German chemist, politician, and ambassador.

== Life ==
After completion of primary school and secondary school, he studied at the University of Freiburg, the Ludwig-Maximilians-Universität München, and the University of Göttingen. In 1930, he received his doctorate PhD at the Friedrich Wilhelm University of Berlin. Then he worked as a chemist, in Berlin from 1934 to 1945, and was employee of IG Farben, Ludwigshafen-Oppau.

On 4 December 1931, he applied for a U.S. patent (1,863,661) for the production of fluorine by the so-called fluorine electrolysis process. That application was upheld on 21 June 1932.

From 1945, he was co-owner of Eilers and Schünemann Verlag, Bremen mbH. As co-founder and member of the Free Democratic Party (FDP), he helped to build a district association in Schotmar. Heinz Krekeler brought together along with the newspaper publisher Max Staercke of Detmold from the existing two district organizations and founded on 6 September 1946 the National Committee of the FDP. After the inclusion of the independent provincial in the state of North Rhine-Westphalia on 21 January 1947 were brought together under his chairmanship, the two country groups, Minden and Lippe.

He was an honorary officer of the economic administration of the French occupation zone in the Economics Ministry in Koblenz, and the State Secretariat for Economic Affairs in Freiburg, and the Swiss State Secretariat for Economic Affairs in Tübingen (U.S. zone of occupation).

From 1946 to 1947, he was a member of the Parliament of Lippe, and in 1946 a member of the Provincial Council of Westphalia, 20 April 1947 to 17 June 1950 deputy of the first parliament of North Rhine-Westphalia. Krekeler moved across the country list (item 5) is a Free Democratic Party (FDP) in the Diet and was vice chairman of the FDP-country Association of North Rhine-Westphalia and a member of the Liberal Union world.

From 1950 to 1951 he was German Consul General, in New York City. From 1951 to 1953, he was chargé d’affaires of the Germany to the United States, and from 1953 to 1958 the first Ambassador of the Federal Republic of Germany in the U.S. He negotiated resumption of relations with the United States.

From 1958 to February 1964, he was a member of the EURATOM Commission of the European Community (EC) in Brussels, then a lecturer in diplomatic and international relations at the Law and Political Sciences Faculty of the University of Münster, and at the College of Political Sciences in Munich.

He died on 5 August 2003 in Bad Salzuflen. In his honor, the Lippe FDP created a civil prize, the Dr. Dr. Heinz Krekeler hc.-medal, with a cash prize of €300. Under the auspices of the Max-Planck-Gesellschaft, he created the Heinz L. Krekeler Foundation to continue research into the conditions that ensure the peaceful coexistence of peoples

== Works ==
- Deutschlands Vertretung im Ausland. Isar-Verlag, 1952; 1978.
- Die Diplomatie. Olzog-Verlag, 1965.
- Die Aussenpolitik: Eine Einführung in die Grundlagen der internationalen Außenpolitik. Olzog-Verlag, 1967
