= Eduard Simon =

German chemist (1789–1856)

Johann Eduard Simon (18 September 1789 – 19 June 1856) was an apothecary in Berlin, Germany.

Johann Eduard Simon accidentally discovered polystyrene in 1839. Simon distilled an oily substance from storax, the resin of the sweetgum tree, Liquidambar orientalis, which he named "styrol". Several days later he found that the styrol had thickened, presumably due to polymerisation, into a jelly which he dubbed styrol oxide ("Stryroloxyd").
