= Evamarie Hey-Hawkins =

German inorganic chemist and professor (born 1957)

Evamarie Hey-Hawkins is a German inorganic chemist and professor at Leipzig University. Her research is focused on main group and transition metal chemistry.

== Biography ==
She received her diploma (1982) and doctoral degree (1983) at the University of Marburg, Germany, with Kurt Dehnicke. After stays at the University of Sussex, UK (1984/85), the University of Western Australia (1985/86) and the ANU (1986/87), she returned to Germany and completed her habilitation in Marburg (1988). From 1988 to 1990 she was a research associate at the Max Planck Institute for Solid State Research, Stuttgart. Evamarie Hey-Hawkins has been a Full Professor of Inorganic Chemistry at Leipzig University, Germany, since 1993.

== Research ==
Her scientific interests comprise many aspects of structural and synthetic chemistry. Much of her work focuses on main group compounds, especially phosphorus compounds. She has also conducted research on bioactive boron compounds. She has authored more than 540 publications in refereed journals.
