= Alexander Nicolaus Scherer =

Russian-German chemist (1771–1824)

Engraving by F. W. Nettling, 1800

Alexander Nicolaus Scherer (Russian: Александр Иванович Шерер, romanized: Aleksandr Ivanovich Sherer; 30 December 1771, St. Petersburg – 16 October 1824, St. Petersburg) was a Russian-German chemist and pharmacologist.

== Career ==
In 1794, he graduated from the University of Jena, later serving as a lecturer at the gymnasium in Weimar. In 1800, he was appointed a professor of physics at the University of Halle, shortly afterwards working as a manager at a stoneware factory in Potsdam. In 1803, he relocated to the Imperial University of Dorpat as a professor of chemistry, and during the following year returned to St. Petersburg as a professor of chemistry and pharmacy at the medico-surgical academy. In 1815, he became a full member of the St. Petersburg Academy of Sciences.

Scherer was instrumental in the creation of the "Pharmaceutical Society of St. Petersburg", an institution in which he served as its first president.

== Written works ==
He was an editor of the journals Allgemeines Journal der Chemie (from 1798 to 1803) and Allgemeine nordische Annalen der Chemie (from 1817 to 1822). He was the author of Kurze Darstellung der chemischen Untersuchungen der Gasarten (Weimar, 1799), translated into English in 1800 as A short introduction to the knowledge of gaseous bodies. Other principal works by Scherer include:

- Versuch einer populären Chemie, 1795 - book on popular chemistry.
- Nachträge zu den Grundzügen der neuern chemischen Theorie, 1796 - Supplements to the basic features of modern chemical theory.
- Grundriss der Chemie für akademische Vorlesungen, 1800 - Outline of chemistry for academic lectures.
- Руководство к преподаванию химии, St. Petersburg 1808.
- Codex medicamentarius Europaeus, 1819-1824.
- Versuch einer systematischen Uebersicht der Heilquellen des russischen Reichs, 1820 - A systematic survey on the mineral springs of the Russian Empire.
- Literatura pharmacopoearum, 1822.

== Sources ==
- "Шерер, Александр-Николай" . Brockhaus and Efron Encyclopedic Dictionary (in Russian). 1906.
