= Otto Perutz =

Austrian-German chemist (1847–1922)

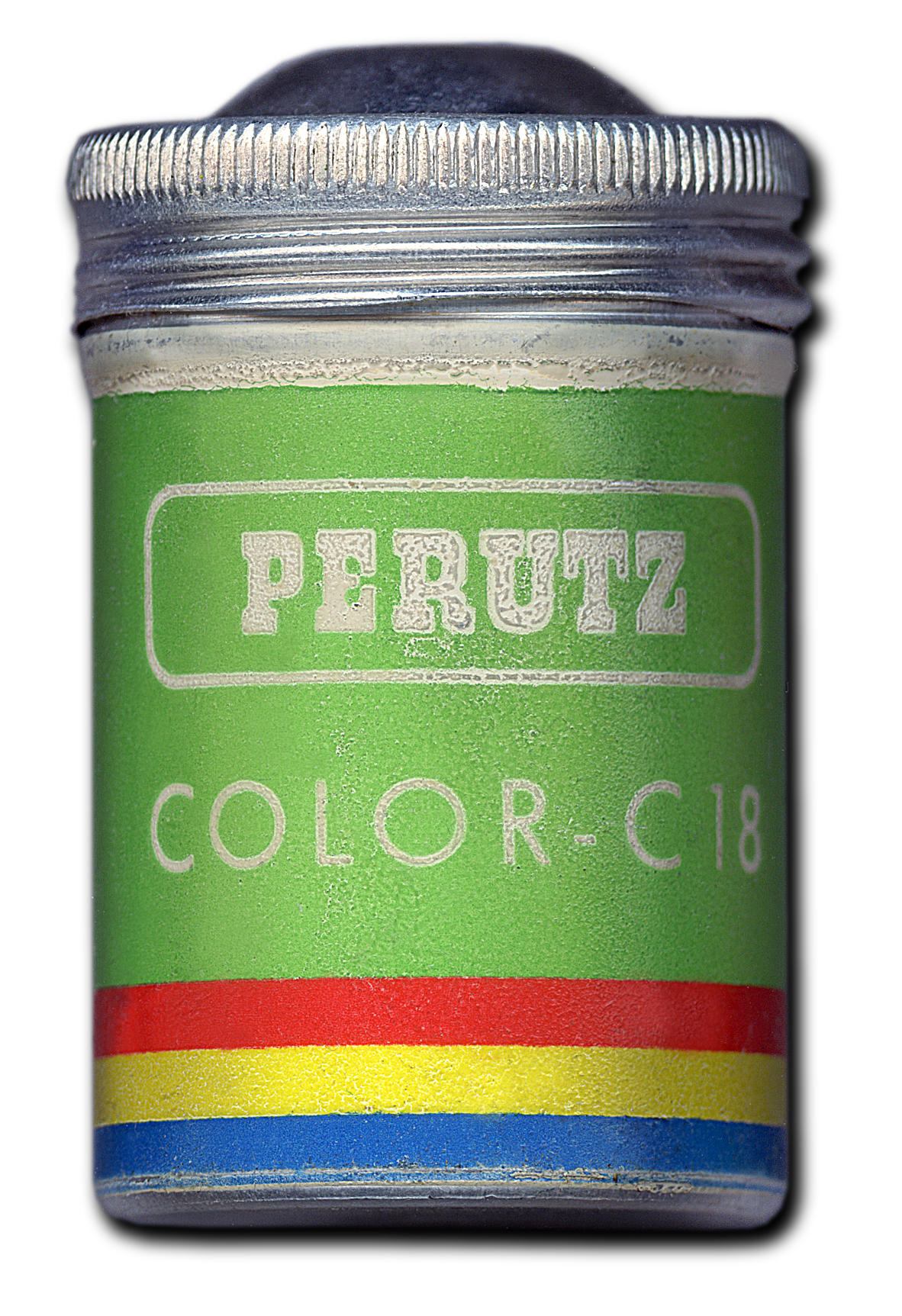
Film box of the color film Perutz C 18 (18 DIN), 1964

Otto Perutz (27 July 1847 – 18 January 1922, Munich) was an Austrian-German chemist.

== Biography ==
Otto Perutz was born on 27 July 1847 in Teplice, Bohemia, Austrian Empire. From 1872 to 1876, Perutz was director of Bayerische Aktiengesellschaft für chemische und landwirtschaftlich-chemische Fabrikate (Bavarian Corporation for Chemical and Agrochemical Products Inc., later Süd-Chemie AG) in Munich-Heufeld.

On 13 April 1880, he purchased the Chemische und pharmacheuische Produktenhandlung Dr. F. Snitter & Co., a merchant in photochemicals in Munich, and founded his own firm, Otto Perutz Trockenplattenfabrik. He developed a method for the industrial production of Eosin-Silver-Plates which had been invented by Hermann Wilhelm Vogel and Johann Baptist Obernetter, and was licensed by Vogel to produce dry plates. This was crucial for the development of colour photography. They were an immediate success when they were introduced in August 1887. In 1896, Perutz-Plates were used for radiography for the first time.

Perutz sold his firm on 1 July 1897. He was a member of the supervisory board of the Bayerische Aktiengesellschaft für chemische und landwirtschaftlich-chemische Fabrikate from 1902 until his death in 1922. He died on 18 January 1922 in Munich. The Perutz-Photowerke became part of Agfa in 1964.
