= Hans Harms =

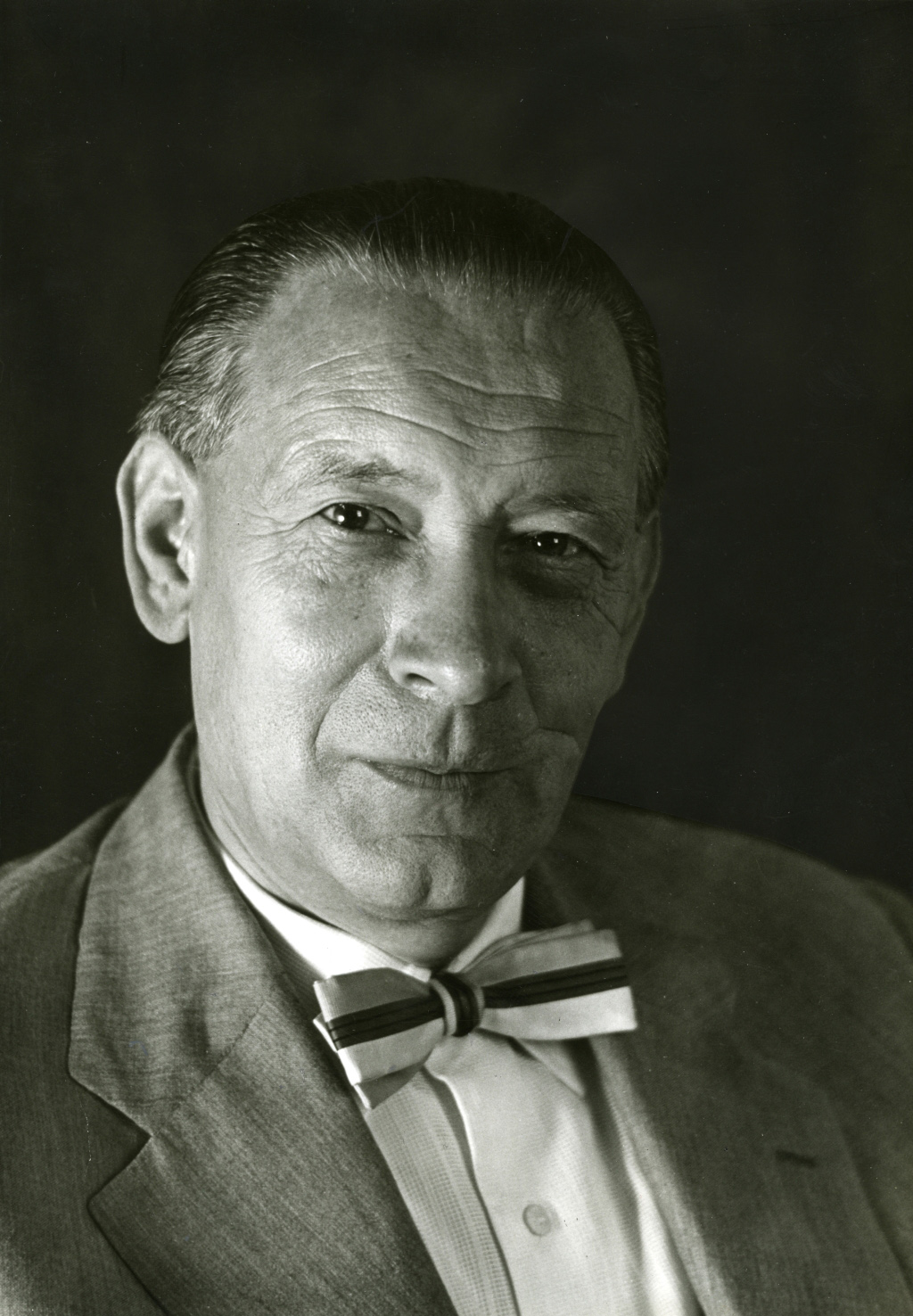
- Hans Harms (1959)
- Born: 3 September 1906; Wiesbaden
- Died: 28 June 1975 (aged 68)
- Occupations: CEO and chairman of Merck
- Predecessor: Karl Merck
- Successor: Hans Joachim Langmann

Hans Harms (born 3 September 1906 in Wiesbaden, died 28 June 1975) was a German chemist and executive in the pharmaceutical industry. He was CEO of Merck from 1959 to 1970.

He studied chemistry at the Technical University of Darmstadt and earned a doctoral degree in chemistry in 1933. He worked for Merck from 1933 to 1973, and was CEO and chairman of the executive board from 1959 to 1970.

He was chairman of the German Pharmaceutical Industry Association from 1970 to 1972. He received the Commander's Cross of the Order of Merit of the Federal Republic of Germany in 1967.

Business positions
Preceded by Karl Merck	CEO of Merck; 1959–1970	Succeeded by Hans Joachim Langmann
