= Leopold Rügheimer =

German chemist (1850–1917)

Leopold Rügheimer (May 5, 1850 – May 24, 1917) was a notable German chemist whose name is connected to the Staedel-Rugheimer pyrazine synthesis, a reaction that was discovered by himself and Wilhelm Staedel. Rügheimer was born in Walldorf (near Meiningen) in 1850 as the son of a merchant. He studied at the universities of Leipzig, Würzburg and Tübingen. He died in Kiel in 1917 after a successful academic career.

== Career ==
Rügheimer's professional career:

1873	Promotion at the University of Tübingen
1875	Assistant at the Chemical Institute of Leiden University
1877	Assistant at the Chemical Institute of the University of Kiel
1889	Position as Professor ordinarius or physical and pharmaceutical chemistry at the university of Kiel

Scientific contributions:

- Published an article together with Wilhelm Staedel concerning the synthesis of pyrazines by reacting α-haloketones with ammonia. This procedure is now known as the Staedel-Rugheimer pyrazine synthesis.
- First synthesis of tropic acid in 1880, together with Albert Ladenburg.
- First synthesis of piperine (1882).

== See also ==
- Staedel-Rugheimer pyrazine synthesis
