= Gerhard Raspé =

German chemist (1928–1974)

Gerhard Raspé (born 20 January 1928 in Bucharest, died 1 September 1974 in West Berlin) was a Romanian-born German organic chemist, who served as research director at Schering AG and a member of the company's executive board.

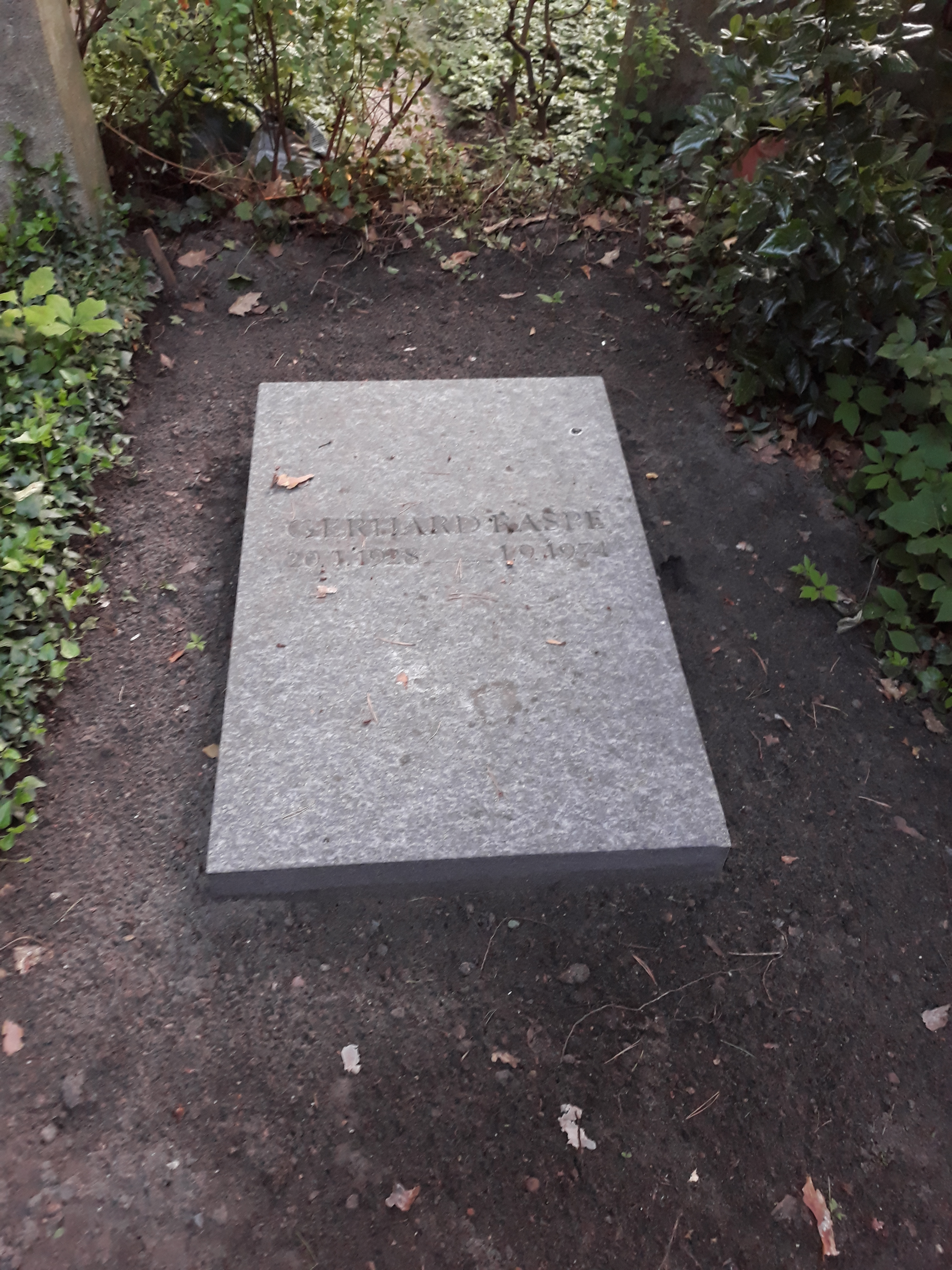
Grave of Gerhard Raspé at Friedhof Heerstraße, Berlin

== Education and career ==
Following his studies of organic chemistry at the Brunswick University of Technology and the University of Madrid, he obtained a doctorate in chemistry (Dr.rer.nat.) and worked as a researcher in the field of steroid hormones and biochemistry at the pharmaceutical company Schering AG. In 1964, he became a member of the executive board of Schering and the company's director of research. He was a board member of the Max Planck Society and a member of the German Council of Science and Humanities. He died in 1974, aged 46.
