= Carl Scheibler =

German chemist (1827–1899)

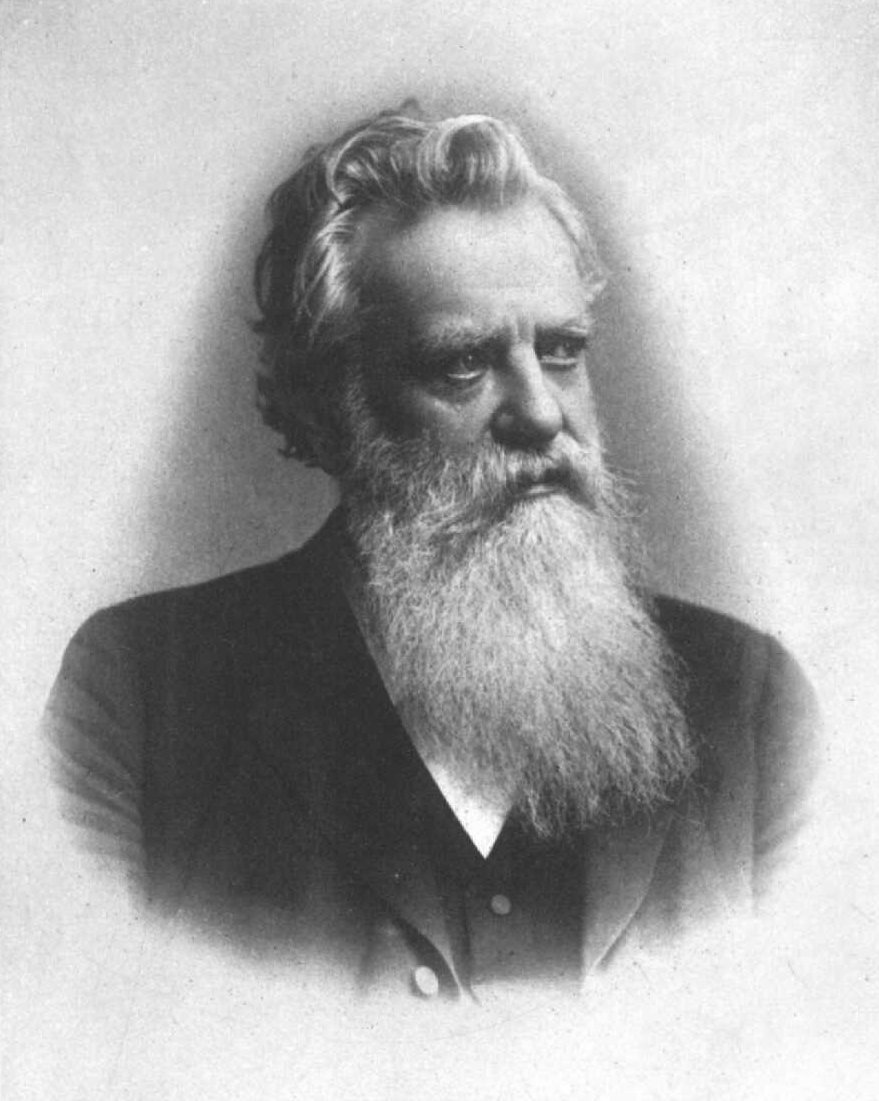
- Carl Scheibler
- Born: Carl Wilhelm Bernhard Scheibler; 16 February 1827; Gemereth/Eupen, Germany
- Died: 2 April 1899 (aged 72); Berlin, Germany
- Education: University of Berlin
- Scientific career
- Fields: sugar, chemistry

Carl Wilhelm Bernhard Scheibler (16 February 1827 – 2 April 1899) was a German chemist. Scheibler's research focused on sugar, including the technical chemistry of sugar production and the composition of molasses.

Scheibler was the son of Friedrich August Theodor Scheibler (1788–1864) and Anna Gertrud Eschweiler (1806–1877) in Gemereth/Eupen, at that time a small town close to the Belgian border. He went to school in Aachen and studied chemistry at the University of Berlin. He received his PhD for his work De Wolframiatibus. Scheibler worked with Gustav Werther in Königsberg and from 1858 at the Pommersche Provinzial-Zuckersiederei in Stettin.

In 1866 Scheibler founded the Zuckerchemische und technische Laboratorium (Laboratory for sugar chemistry and technology) in Berlin, which was financed by the Verein der Deutschen Zuckerrübenindustrie (Association of the German Sugar Beet Industry). It was one of the first institutes dedicated to the chemistry of sugar. In 1870 Scheibler became professor at the Gewerbeakademie Berlin and at the University of Agriculture Berlin and he also was a member of the imperial patent office in Berlin between 1877 and 1882.

After a conflict with the Verein der Deutschen Zuckerrübenindustrie in 1882, he only worked privately at his institute, but he was able to patent several inventions in that time. For example, he helped his relative Carl Johann Heinrich Scheibler invent a fertiliser, and he also improved smokeless powder for Otto von Bismarck in 1888.

His most influential patents were based on the technical production of sugar from beets. The crystallisation of sugar from molasses was difficult and therefore the sugar had to be separated from the molasses. In 1863 Scheibler invented the elution method. During his research on molasses he discovered several compounds in molasses, for example betaine, asparaginic acid, glutamic acid, arabinose, arabinic acid, dextran, phosphoglyceride and cholesterol.

He improved the strontia saccharate process, in which strontium hydroxide is mixed with the molasses and strontium di-saccharate precipitates and can be separated from the molasses. Prior to World War I the beet sugar industry used 100,000 to 150,000 tons of strontium hydroxide for this process per year.

Scheibler died in Berlin on 2 April 1899.
