= Johann Zwelfer =

German chemist, pharmacist, and physician (1618–1668)

Johann Zwelfer (1618–1668) was a German chemist, pharmacist and physician.

== Works ==
- Herrn Johann Zwölfern Königliche Apotheck Oder Dispensatorium. Endter, Nürnberg 1692 Digital edition by the University and State Library Düsseldorf
