= Rainer Grießhammer =

German chemist (born 1953)

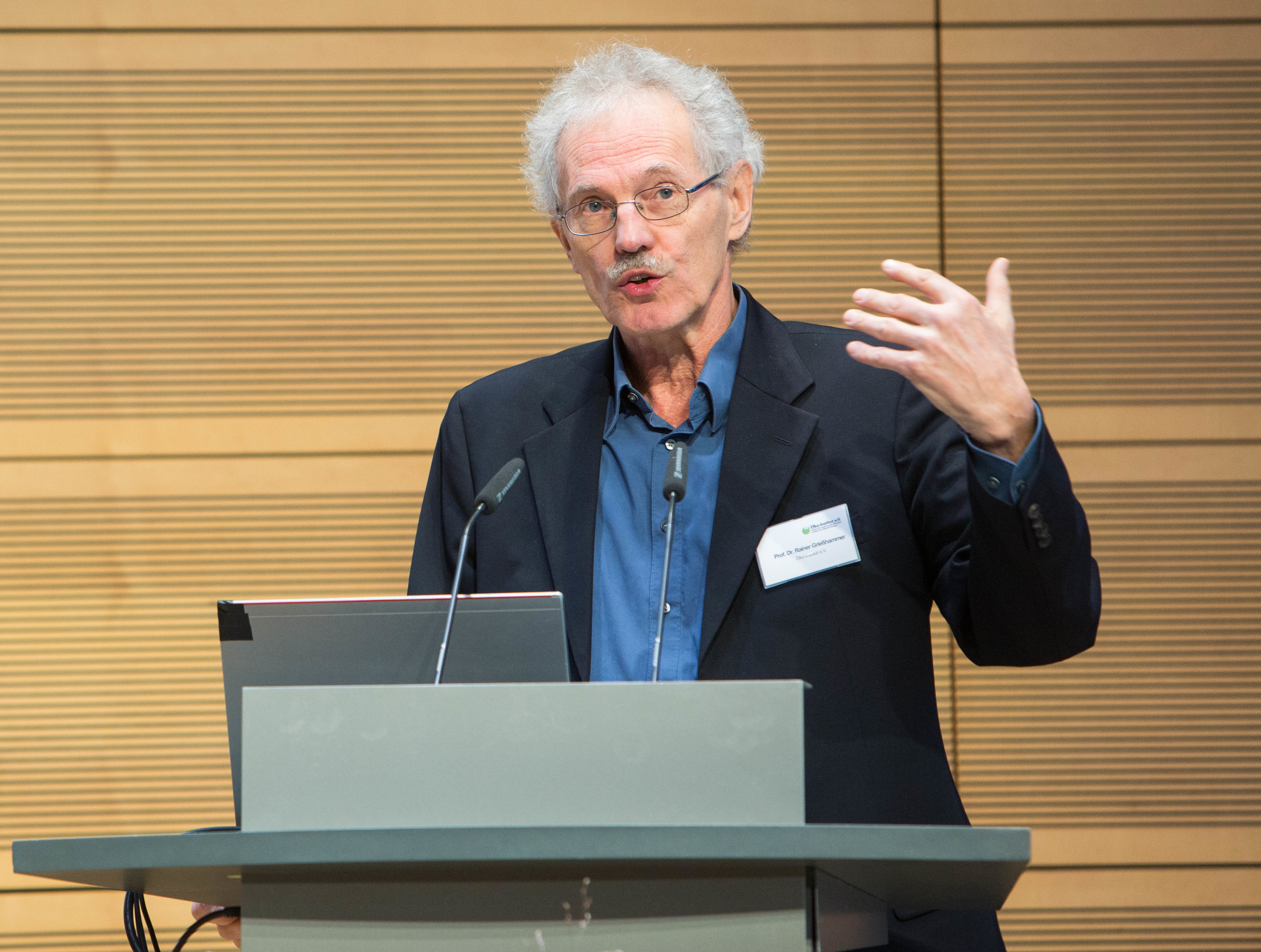
Grießhammer in 2016

Rainer Grießhammer (born 14 July 1953) is a German chemist and member of the executive board of the Oeko-Institut.

Besides his practical work, Grießhammer is managing director of the Future Heritage Foundation (Stiftung Zukunftserbe) in Freiburg (since 2000). He is the author of numerous scientific articles and popular science publications. Since 2012, Grießhammer has been honorary professor for sustainable products at the Albert Ludwig University of Freiburg.

== Education and career ==
Grießhammer studied chemistry at the University of Basel and at the Eberhard Karls University, Tübingen. After graduating, he began his career as a scientist at the Oeko-Institut and has helped to shape the institute’s development over more than 30 years – including as a member of its committee and of its executive board. The progression of his career mirrors the evolution of the environmental movement from a neglected sideline to a key societal and political topic of the present day.

In parallel to his work at the Oeko-Institut Grießhammer was the publisher of the chemical policy journal Informationsdienst Chemie und Umwelt, ICU (1984–1997), gave lectures at the University of Giessen (1996–1999) and has served since 2000 as executive director of the Legacy for the Future Foundation (Stiftung Zukunftserbe). Since 2012, Grießhammer has been honorary professor for sustainable products at the Albert Ludwig University of Freiburg and a member of the research advisory board of the “Consumers, Market and Policy” Research Centre at the Zeppelin University in Friedrichshafen.

== Fields of work and (selected) projects ==
Griesshammer’s main areas of work have been "chemistry and environment" (1982–1992), product evaluation and life-cycle assessments (1989–1995), sustainable development and material flow management (1992–2000), sustainable products and consumption, and transformations (from around 1996 to now). His product-related studies substantially influenced the international development of methods in the field of life-cycle assessment (life-cycle management, material flow analyses and product sustainability assessment). Corresponding projects and critical reviews were carried out at EU level and in Denmark, France, Great Britain, the Netherlands, Sweden and Switzerland.

The research projects in the area of "chemistry and environment" (1982–1992) concentrated on the environmental impacts caused by chemicals and the specific problems associated with them, on the one hand, and on German chemicals legislation, European Union chemicals law and the conception of a new chemicals policy, on the other. This phase culminated and concluded with work in and on behalf of the Enquete Commission of the German Bundestag on “Protection of Humanity and the Environment”. Both the concept of a societally transformed management of chemicals and the results of the Enquete Commission of the German Bundestag were substantially influenced by Griesshammer.

In the area of “product evaluation and life-cycle assessments” (1989–1995), Grießhammer most notably contributed (including internationally, under the auspices of SETAC) to developing the life-cycle assessment (LCA) method and by carrying out practice-oriented LCAs and sustainability assessments of several kinds of commercial products (laundry detergents, domestic appliances, TV sets, computers, products containing CFCs, recycled paper, packaging, surgical drape materials, plastics, textiles and coffee). The ISO 14040 standard requires “critical reviews” to be performed for published life-cycle assessments, where Rainer Grießhammer is one of the reviewers in frequent demand internationally.

His research work in the area of sustainable development and material flow management (1992–2000) concentrated on overarching environmental objectives and sustainability indicators, on concretising and implementing the guiding vision of sustainable development at the level of products and materials in general, and for certain sectors and areas of need in particular (information and communication, construction and housing, clothing and washing), and on the structuring of stake-holder cooperation.

Around 1996 he commenced research work on the theme of sustainable products and consumption. A major aspect of this field of work is the development of the PROSA product sustainability assessment methodology. The PROSA approach, in contrast to LCA, places special emphasis on the analysis of social and economic aspects and on the inclusion of utility aspects and consumer research. In developing the associated tools, attention was paid to international harmonisation and exchange of experience, e.g. with SETAC on Life Cycle Costing, with the UNEP-SETAC Life Cycle Initiative on Social LCA, and with large corporations on application in practice.

Griesshammer’s main work areas come to bear in the EcoTopTen initiative, a German campaign for sustainable products across a range of product categories. The initiative was prepared with a project designed and led by Grießhammer under commission from the German Federal Ministry of Education and Research (BMBF), and public relations communication has been in progress since March 2005 in the form of a major information campaign.

Since 2010 he has been researching the thematic complexes of transformations, sustainable industry policy and product policy. Since 2014 Griesshammer, along with Prof. Matthias Bergman of the Institute for Socio-Ecological Research (ISOE), has jointly headed the scientific coordination of the BMBF programme "Environmentally and socially compatible transformation of the German energy system”.

== Memberships ==
Grießhammer is an Expert member of the Enquete Commission of the German Bundestag on the "Protection of Humanity and the Environment" (1992–1994), member of the Scientific Advisory Board on “Consumer and Food Policy” at the Federal Ministry of Food, Agriculture and Consumer Protection (since 2002); acting member of the board of trustees at Stiftung Warentest (since 2003), member of the German Advisory Council on Global Change (WBGU) (2004–2009), and member of the board of trustees of Utopia-Stiftung, a German foundation for sustainable consumption (since 2008).

== Awards ==
In 2010 Grießhammer was awarded the German Environmental Award of Deutsche Bundesstiftung Umwelt, the German Federal Environmental Foundation.

== Publications (selected) ==
- Letzte Chance für den Wald: Die abwendbaren Folgen des sauren Regens. Dreisam-Verlag, Freiburg 1983, ISBN 3-921472-65-2.
- Formaldehyd – Eine Nation wird geleimt with Fritz Vahrenholt and Frank Claus, rororo aktuell, Reinbek 1984, ISBN 3-499-15543-5.
- Der Ökokoch, Rainer Grießhammer und Siegfried de Witt, Rowohlt-Verlag, Reinbek 1986, ISBN 3-498-02439-6.
- Ozonloch und Treibhauseffekt, with Christian Hey, Peter Hennicke, Fritz Kalberlah, Rowohlt-Verlag, Reinbek 1989, ISBN 3-499-12603-6.
- Chemie und Umwelt. Reihe Gute Argumente, Beck-Verlag, München 1993, ISBN 3-406-32323-5.
- Der Öko-Knigge. Rowohlt-Verlag, Reinbek 1990, ISBN 3-499-18351-X.
- Wen macht die Banane krumm? Rowohlt-Verlag, Reinbek 1995, ISBN 3-499-19361-2.
- with Edmone Roffael: Verwendung von Durchforstungsholz und Altpapier zur Papierherstellung unter Berücksichtigung forstwirtschaftlicher Belange, Luft, Boden, Abfall. (Heft 37), Stuttgart 1995
- Ätzend – Ein Chemiebuch. Rowohlt-Verlag, Berlin 2000, ISBN 3-871-34361-7.
- Der Klima-Knigge. Booklett, Berlin 2007, ISBN 978-3-940153-02-9.
- "Nachhaltige Industriepolitik am Beispiel der Haushaltsgeräte-Industrie", BMBF-Studie des Öko-Instituts, Freiburg 2011
- "Energieeffizienter Klimaschutz bei Produkten. Vorhaben zur Weiterentwicklung des nationalen Teils der Klimaschutzinitiative", Studie des Öko-Instituts, Freiburg 2012 (Gefördert durch: Bundesministerium für Umwelt, Naturschutz und Reaktorsicherheit BMU im Rahmen der Nationalen Klimaschutz-Initiative)
- "Wie Transformationen und gesellschaftliche Innovationen gelingen können". Baden-Baden 2015, ISBN 978-3-8487-2611-0
- "How Transformations and Social Innovations Can Succeed", Baden-Baden 2015, ISBN 978-3-8487-2741-4
