= Doug Specht =

Canadian gridiron football player (1942–2025)

Profile
- Positions: Center, Guard

Personal information
- Born: February 7, 1942; Windsor, Ontario, Canada
- Died: March 7, 2025 (aged 83); Ottawa, Ontario, Canada
- Listed height: 6 ft 2 in (1.88 m)
- Listed weight: 236 lb (107 kg)

Career information
- College: BYU

Career history
- 1965–1971: Ottawa Rough Riders

Awards and highlights
- 2× Grey Cup champion (1968, 1969); CFL East All-Star (1966)

Douglas Lawrence Specht (February 7, 1942 – March 7, 2025) was a Canadian professional football player who played for the Ottawa Rough Riders, with whom he won the Grey Cup in 1968 and 1969. Specht was selected Eastern Conference All-Star in 1966. He played university football at Brigham Young University on a football scholarship. In 2006, Specht was inducted into the Windsor-Essex County Sports Hall of Fame. He remained an Ottawa resident following his playing career and was a long time respected Bailiff in the region.
