= Tina van de Flierdt =

British geochemist (born 1973)

- Education: University of Bonn ETH Zurich
- Scientific career
- Workplaces: Imperial College London Columbia University Lamont–Doherty Earth Observatory
- Thesis: The Nd, Hf, and Pb isotopic composition of ferromanganese crusts and their paleoceanographic implications

Tina van de Flierdt (born 1973) is a Professor of Isotope Geochemistry at Imperial College London.

== Education ==
Van de Flierdt grew up in rural western Germany. In 2000 van de Flierdt completed a diploma in Geology at the University of Bonn. She earned a PhD at ETH Zurich in 2003, working with Alexander Halliday.

== Career ==
Van de Flierdt is interested in the marine-terminating sector of the East Antarctic Ice Sheet during past warm periods. Her research looks to develop new geochemical and isotopic tracers in marine geochemistry, paleoceanography and paleoclimate, with particular focus on radiogenic isotopes. She is co-lead of the MAGIC Isotope group in the Department of Earth Sciences at Imperial College London. She is also a research at the Lamont–Doherty Earth Observatory at Columbia University.

She is part of the international Geotraces program. Part of the Geotraces program is to ensure results for trace elements and isotopes collected on different cruises by different laboratories can be compared in a meaningful way. Van de Flierdt is building a global database of neodymium in the oceans and researching the implications for paleoceanography research.

In 2012, she won a Leverhulme Trust grant to research deep sea corals. She was part of the Natural Environment Research Council project SWEET, Super-Warm Early Eocene Temperatures and climate. She has led several major NERC grants, totalling well over a £1,000,000 as principal investigator. Van de Flierdt is a member of the Royal Society's International Exchange Committee. She is an editor of Geochimica et Cosmochimica Acta. She has appeared on the podcast Forecast: Climate Conversations.
