= Wilhelm Boland =

German chemist (born 1950)

Wilhelm Boland (born 5 January 1950 in Wesel) is a German chemist.

== Scientific career ==
After his dissertation (1978) and habilitation (1986) at the University of Cologne, Boland became associate professor of Organic Chemistry at Karlsruhe University in 1987. He was appointed Full Professor of Bioorganic Chemistry at Bonn University in 1994. Since 1996 he is Director and Scientific Member at the Max Planck Institute for Chemical Ecology and head of the Department of Bioorganic Chemistry (Emeritus since 2018). In 1998 he was appointed Honorary Professor at the Friedrich Schiller University in Jena.

Boland studies the defensive chemistry of leaf beetles and the induction of plant defense pathways. Microbial interactions with plants and insects are further research topics in his department. He developed new methods in analytical and synthetic chemistry and investigates enzyme mechanisms and the gut chemistry of insects.

== Awards and honors ==
- Silverstein-Simeone Lecture Award of the International Society of Chemical Ecology, 1995
- Member of the North Rhine-Westphalia Academy for Sciences and Arts (since 2002)
- Hans Herloff Inhoffen Medal of the German Research Centre for Biotechnology (GBF), 2005
- Peter Hemmerich Lecture, University of Konstanz, 2006
- President of the International Society of Chemical Ecology 2008–2009
- Silver Medal Award der International Society of Chemical Ecology 2023

== Selected publications ==
- Takabayashi, Junji; Arimura, Gen-Ichiro; Ozawa, Rika; Shimoda, Takeshi; Nishioka, Takaaki; Boland, Wilhelm (2000). "Herbivory-induced volatiles elicit defence genes in lima bean leaves". Nature. 406 (6795): 512–5. Bibcode:2000Natur.406..512A. doi:10.1038/35020072. PMID 10952311. S2CID 4427770.
- Kuhn, J. (2004). "Selective transport systems mediate sequestration of plant glucosides in leaf beetles: A molecular basis for adaptation and evolution". Proceedings of the National Academy of Sciences. 101 (38): 13808–13813. Bibcode:2004PNAS..10113808K. doi:10.1073/pnas.0402576101. PMC 518838. PMID 15365181.
- Heil, Martin; Greiner, Sabine; Meimberg, Harald; Krüger, Ralf; Noyer, Jean-Louis; Heubl, Günther; Eduard Linsenmair, K.; Boland, Wilhelm (2004). "Evolutionary change from induced to constitutive expression of an indirect plant resistance". Nature. 430 (6996): 205–8. Bibcode:2004Natur.430..205H. doi:10.1038/nature02703. PMID 15241414. S2CID 4416036.
- Mithofer, A.; Wanner, G; Boland, W (2005). "Effects of Feeding Spodoptera littoralis on Lima Bean Leaves. II. Continuous Mechanical Wounding Resembling Insect Feeding is Sufficient to Elicit Herbivory-Related Volatile Emission". Plant Physiology. 137 (3): 1160–8. doi:10.1104/pp.104.054460. PMC 1065415. PMID 15728342..
- Heil, M.; Rattke, J; Boland, W (2005). "Postsecretory Hydrolysis of Nectar Sucrose and Specialization in Ant/Plant Mutualism". Science. 308 (5721): 560–3. Bibcode:2005Sci...308..560H. doi:10.1126/science.1107536. PMID 15845855. S2CID 18065410.
- Arimura, Gen-Ichiro; Kost, Christian; Boland, Wilhelm (2005). "Herbivore-induced, indirect plant defences". Biochimica et Biophysica Acta (BBA) - Molecular and Cell Biology of Lipids. 1734 (2): 91–111. doi:10.1016/j.bbalip.2005.03.001. PMID 15904867.
- Walter, Agnes; Mazars, Christian; Maitrejean, Mathias; Hopke, Jörn; Ranjeva, Raoul; Boland, Wilhelm; Mithöfer, Axel (2007). "Structural Requirements of Jasmonates and Synthetic Analogues as Inducers of Ca2+ Signals in the Nucleus and the Cytosol of Plant Cells". Angewandte Chemie International Edition. 46 (25): 4783–5. doi:10.1002/anie.200604989. PMID 17487903.
- Dabrowska, P.; Freitak, D.; Vogel, H.; Heckel, D. G.; Boland, W. (2009). "The phytohormone precursor OPDA is isomerized in the insect gut by a single, specific glutathione transferase". Proceedings of the National Academy of Sciences. 106 (38): 16304–9. Bibcode:2009PNAS..10616304D. doi:10.1073/pnas.0906942106. PMC 2752597. PMID 19805297.
- Kirsch, R.; Vogel, H.; Muck, A.; Reichwald, K.; Pasteels, J. M.; Boland, W. (2011). "Host plant shifts affect a major defense enzyme in Chrysomela lapponica". Proceedings of the National Academy of Sciences. 108 (12): 4897–901. Bibcode:2011PNAS..108.4897K. doi:10.1073/pnas.1013846108. PMC 3064323. PMID 21383196.
- Mithöfer, Axel; Boland, Wilhelm (2012). "Plant defense against herbivores: Chemical aspects". Annual Review of Plant Biology. 63: 431–450. doi:10.1146/annurev-arplant-042110-103854. PMID 22404468.
- Strauß, A.; Peters, S.; Boland, W.; Burse, A. (2013). "ABC transporter functions as a pacemaker for the sequestration of plant glucosides in leaf beetles". eLife. 2013, 2:e01096 e01096. doi:10.7554/eLife.01096. PMC 3843118. PMID 24302568.
- González-Teuber, M.; Kaltenpoth, M.; Boland, W. (2014). "Mutualistic ants as an indirect defence against leaf pathogens". New Phytologist. 202 (2): 640–650. doi:10.1111/nph.12664. hdl:11858/00-001M-0000-0014-BEF8-A. PMID 24392817.
- Pesek, J.; Svoboda, J.; Sattler, M.; Bartram, S.; Boland, W. (2015). "Biosynthesis of 8-hydroxyquinoline-2-carboxylic acid, an iron chelator from the gut of the lepidopteran Spodoptera littoralis". Organic & Biomolecular Chemistry. 13 (12): 178–184. doi:10.1039/c4ob01857e. PMID 25356857.
