= Uwe Meierhenrich =

German chemist (born 1967)

Uwe Meierhenrich (born 23 October 1967 in Detmold) is a German Physico-Chemist. He is a professor of Analytical and Physical Chemistry at the University of Nice Sophia Antipolis in France.

== Academic life ==
Meierhenrich was raised in a family of teachers and professors. He studied chemistry at the Philipps-University Marburg and obtained a Ph.D. degree in physical chemistry at the University of Bremen by Thiemann. He did postdoctoral work at the Max Planck Institute for Solar System Research in Katlenburg-Lindau and at the French Synchrotron Center LURE. In 2003 he earned his habilitation with the publication of The Origin of Biomolecular Asymmetry at the University of Bremen. In 2005 he was hired as a professor at the University of Nice Sophia Antipolis in France. For his work on chirality, he was awarded the Horst-Pracejus-Prize of the Gesellschaft Deutscher Chemiker (German Chemical Society) in 2011.

== Career ==
Meierhenrich was hired by the European Space Agency to develop instrumentation for its Rosetta mission to 67P/Churyumov–Gerasimenko. The purpose of the instrumentation was to detect organic compounds on the comet's surface. To test it on Earth, he worked with scientists at Leiden University in the Netherlands who were making artificial cometary ice. They replicated the conditions in space, creating a cold vacuum and bombarding the ice with ultraviolet light. They succeeded in synthesizing 16 amino acids. When the Rosetta spacecraft reached 67P in 2014, it detected similar organic compounds in the comet. In further experiments at his lab in Nice, he analyzed cometary ice analogs with multidimensional gas chromatography and detected ribose, one of the sugars that make up DNA.

Further experiments at the French SOLEIL synchrotron showed that life's homochirality can also originate under interstellar conditions.

== Publications ==
- Muñoz Caro, G. M.; Meierhenrich, U. J.; Schutte, W. A.; Barbier, B.; Arcones Segovia, A.; Rosenbauer, H.; Thiemann, W. H.-P.; Brack, A.; Greenberg, J. M. (28 March 2002). "Amino acids from ultraviolet irradiation of interstellar ice analogues". Nature. 416 (6879): 403–406. Bibcode:2002Natur.416..403M. doi:10.1038/416403a. PMID 11919624. S2CID 4391872.
- —; Munoz Caro, G. M.; Bredehoft, J. H.; Jessberger, E. K.; Thiemann, W. H.-P. (11 June 2004). "Identification of diamino acids in the Murchison meteorite". Proceedings of the National Academy of Sciences. 101 (25): 9182–9186. Bibcode:2004PNAS..101.9182M. doi:10.1073/pnas.0403043101. PMC 438950. PMID 15194825.
- —; Nahon, Laurent; Alcaraz, Christian; Bredehöft, Jan Hendrik; Hoffmann, Søren V.; Barbier, Bernard; Brack, André (5 September 2005). "Asymmetric Vacuum UV photolysis of the Amino Acid Leucine in the Solid State". Angewandte Chemie International Edition. 44 (35): 5630–5634. doi:10.1002/anie.200501311. PMID 16035020.
- — (2008). Amino acids and the asymmetry of life : caught in the act of formation. Berlin: Springer. ISBN 978-3-540-76885-2.
- — (2015). Comets And Their Origin: The Tools To Decipher A Comet. John Wiley & Sons. ISBN 9783527412815.
