= Harald Specht =

German scientist and author (born 1951)

Harald Specht (born 20 December 1951) is a German scientist and author. He published the first German monograph on issues of cold shortening and electrical stimulation, but he became mainly known for his books about Jesus of Nazareth and early Christianity in which he doubts the historicity of Jesus of Nazareth. He also argues that the development of Christianity is a result of religious and political disputes on the basis of ancient pagan sources.

== Life ==
Specht was born in Koethen (Anhalt). He studied at the University of Halle-Wittenberg and graduated in 1978 with a doctoral thesis to Dr. rer. nat. In 1986 he obtained his post-doctoral qualification at the Humboldt University of Berlin to Dr.-Ing. habil. in the field of food technology. In 1987 he became a university lecturer at the Technical University Koethen and later at the Otto von Guericke University Magdeburg.

== Activity as a scientist and author ==
As chemist and food technologist Specht worked mainly on problems of air separation and also catalysis and cold treatment of meat. He was a member of the German Chemical Society and also of editorial advisory boards as well as of brain trusts. In addition to publishing numerous scientific publications Harald Specht operated increasingly also as a filmmaker and book author. He wrote screenplays, film commentaries and novels but mainly non-fiction books on cultural, historical, philosophical and religious studies topics (see works – book selection). Here Specht argued that some contents of the New Testament are not historical occurrences but are compiled inventions of the second century and later. Furthermore, he doubts the Paul's authorship of the St. Paul's epistles.

== Works (book selection) ==
- Kaelteverkuerzung und Elektrostimulation bei Fleisch – Untersuchungen an Schaf- und Rindfleisch, Leipzig, 1990, ISBN 3-343-00534-7.
- Von Isis zu Jesus – 5000 Jahre Mythos und Macht, Leipzig 2004, ISBN 3-937209-82-4.
- Geschichte(n) der Dummheit – Die sieben Sünden des menschlichen Schwachsinns, Leipzig 2004, ISBN 978-3-86901-897-3.
- Geschichte(n) der Lust – Zwölf Kapitel Leidenschaft und Laster, Leipzig 2005, ISBN 3-938288-76-0.
- Geschichte(n) der Lüge – Amüsantes und Skandalöses rund ums 8. Gebot, Leipzig 2006, ISBN 3-939144-83-5.
- Die Geburt des Abendlandes – Band 1: Der Tempel der Weisheit und die zweiundsiebzig Namen Gottes, Leipzig 2008, ISBN 978-3-86703-729-7.
- Die Geburt des Abendlandes – Band 2: Das Buch der Weisheit und die Spuren des Lichts, Leipzig 2008, ISBN 978-3-86703-730-3.
- Jesus? Tatsachen und Erfindungen, Leipzig 2010, ISBN 978-3-86901-898-0.
- Der Jahwe-Code – Auf den Spuren der heiligen Zahl 72, Leipzig 2011, ISBN 978-3-86268-375-8.
- Liebe, Laster, Leidenschaft – Geheimnisse großer Gemälde, Leipzig 2014, ISBN 978-3-86502-324-7.
- Das Erbe des Heidentums – Antike Quellen des christlichen Abendlands, Marburg 2015 and Baden-Baden 2017, ISBN 978-3-8288-3561-0.

== Reviews and reception (selection) ==
- H. Sielaff, Humboldt-Univ. zu Berlin, review in journal “Fleisch”, 43 (7), 1989.
- K. O. Honikel, Institut für Fleischforschung Kulmbach, review in journal “Fleischwirtschaft”, 70 (9), 1990.
- G.J.D. Soares, J.A.G.Areas, J.P.Batistuti: "Effect of High Voltage Electrical Stimulation on Buffalo Meat Conditioning", review in Rev. Bras. de AGROCIÊNCIA, v.1, No. 2, p 61, 1995.
- H. Detering: “Harald Specht: Jesus? Tatsachen und Erfindungen”, review in journal „Aufklaerung und Kritik”, Zeitschrift für freies Denken und humanistische Philosophie, Nuernberg, 18. Jahrgang, 2/2011 ISSN 0945-6627, p. 241 ff
- D. Walz: “Als ich noch der Pontius Pilatus war. Ein Wiedergänger schreibt Geschichte", Leipzig 2013, Chapter 9.
- R. Weber: “Was bleibt vom Christentum ohne Jesus?”, review in journal: “Saekulare Humanisten”, Giordano Bruno Stiftung GBS Rhein-Neckar, Mannheim 09/2014, p 1.
- R. Weber: “Denken statt glauben – Wie das Christentum wirklich entstanden ist”, Norderstedt 2015, p 212 ff.
- S. R. Krebs: “Ueber das Erbe des Heidentums im ‘christlichen’ Abendland”, review in: “Ein Freigeist, Ein Forum aus Weimar”, Weimar 05/2016.
- W. Müller: "Ueber das Erbe im 'christlichen' Abendland", review in: "Wissen bloggt. Humanismus Hic Habitat", Unterfoehring 05/2016.
- S.R. Krebs: "Nicht nur Satire: Christlicher Klerus und menschliche Sexualität", in: "Ein Freigeist, Ein Forum aus Weimar", Weimar 07/2016
- S. R. Krebs: “Verborgenes Wissen um die Zahl 72 in einem ‘Bibel-Code’?, review in: “Ein Freigeist, Ein Forum aus Weimar”, Weimar 08/2016.
- A. Markt-Huter: “Harald Specht: Das Erbe des Heidentums”, review in: Lesen in Tirol, Tiroler Bildungsservice, 08/2016.
- W. Roble: “Lichtachsen, Pentagramme und der Goldene Schnitt-Die Wiederentdeckung der Stadtplanung von der Antike bis zur Neuzeit”
- D. Wolf: “Das christlich-patriarchale ›Feindbild Frau‹”, archemama, 20.Sept. 2016
- S. R. Krebs: "5000 Jahre Mythos und Macht: Von ISIS zu Jesus und Maria", review in: "Ein Freigeist, Ein Forum aus Weimar", Weimar 08/2016
- M.B.: "Das Erbe des Heidentums", review in "De omnibus dubitandum – Radikalkritik – Beiträge zur historischen Kritik der fruehchristlichen Geschichte", 11. Dec. 2016,
- H.-G. Weiske: "Die Erfindung des Christentums", Books on Demand, 2017
- A. Markt-Huter: "Harald Specht, Jesus? Tatschen und Erfindungen", review in: Lesen in Tirol, Tiroler Bildungsservice, 4.1.2017
- Encyclopedia AnthraWiki: Lemma "Zweiundsiebzig Sprachen", first reference: Harald Specht: Der Jahwe-Code. Auf den Spuren der heiligen Zahl 72, Leipzig 2011, ISBN 978-3-86268-375-8, 7. Febr. 2017, see: https://anthrowiki.at/Zweiundsiebzig_Sprachen
- G. Vobig: "Wenn Kleines groß geschrieben wird", 24.4.2017 in: https://guidovobig.com/2017/04/22/wenn-kleines-gross-geschrieben-wird/
- S. Karlhuber: "Vom Blut des Adonis und den Wurzeln der Anemone – Ueberlegungen zum Ursprung des Wortes 'Anemone' im Zusammenhang mit dem Adonismythos", BoD Norderstedt, Paperback, 12. Juni 2017, p. 73 and 187, ISBN 978-3-7431-8864-8
- S.R. Krebs: "Problemfall Priesterkaste II – Religions-und kirchenkritische Rezensionen 2015–2017", Reutlingen 2017, p. 83–89, p. 92–94, p. 96–100, p. 109–113, 121–128, p. 131–136, p. 151–156
- R. Weber: "Jesus Römer Christentum – Makaberste Tragödie des Abendlands", Norderstedt 2017
- H. Detering: "Christi Brueder – Wie heidnische Mythen das Christusbild prägten", Vol. I, Wroclaw 2017, p. 89, p. 95, ISBN 978-1-9732-7878-8
- Έ. Μυθικιστές: "Ο πάστορας Hermann Detering και ο Μυθικισμός στη Γερμανία", 8. Dec. 2017
- D. Wolf: "Wer war ECHNATON?: Eine etwas andere Sicht auf den weltberühmten ›ersten Monotheisten"
- A. Müller: "Zur Entwicklung des religiösen Glaubens – Eine kurze Literaturauswertung mit Ergänzungen zur Entstehung und Weiterentwicklung des Glaubens an Geister, Seelen und Götter", pp. 47, 49, 67f
- "Kraft-Buch des Monats: 'Geschichten der Lust – Zwölf Kapitel Leidenschaft und Laster' (Harald Specht, 2005, Engelsdorfer Verlag)", review in: Newsletter 9 der AnuKan Buddies, September 2017, p. 3
- D. Wolf: "Das andere Aegypten-Buch – Der Kampf gegen Weisheit und Macht der matriarchalen Urkultur Aegyptens. Das christlich-patriarchale ›Feindbild Frau‹",
- D. Wolf: "Das andere Geschichtsbuch – Vom Ur-Matriarchat zur Diktatur des Patriarchats"
- V. Ritters: "Nicolas Poussin 'et in arcadia ego II' 1638 gedeutet nach der verborgenen Geometrie: Saunieres Konzept einer katharischen Einweihung – Poussins Konzept einer urreligioesen Einweihung in Beziehung zu Rennes-le-Chateau", BoD – Books on Demand, 25.01.2018
- A. Markt-Huter: "Harald Specht, Liebe, Laster, Leidenschaft", review in: Lesen in Tirol, Tiroler Bildungsservice, writing: 25.3.2019, publication: 24.5.2019, see: https://lesen.tibs.at/node/5702
- A. Markt-Huter: "Harald Specht, Geschichte(n) der Luege", review in: Lesen in Tirol, Tiroler Bildungsservice, writing: 7.8.2019, publication: 11.11.2019, see: https://lesen.tibs.at/preview.php?id=5889
- D. Wolf: "Neue Hinweise zur alten Geschichte der Arya – Aufsätze", S.81
- G. Dittrich: "Mariologien der frühen Kirchen", www.heilig-land-wein.de, Info-Service 5/2020, Pleinfeld, S. 5
- K. Kolm (Editor F. Knöbl): "Jesus trifft Buddha. Das atheistische Evangelium", Frank & Timme GmbH, Verlag für wissenschaftliche Literatur, Berlin 2020, S. 367
- A. Sonnenschein (Pseud.): "Der Name des 'echten Sohnes Gottes' ist nie, nie, nie Jesus Christus!!!", BoD, Books on Demand, Norderstedt 2021, S. 163
- L. Horn: "Jungfrau, Himmlische, Gottsgebärerin. Der Kult der antiken Göttinnen Artemis und Aphrodite als Kontext früher Marienverehrung?", Techn. Univ. Dresden, S.22; (First published in: G. Loster-Schneider, M. Häusl, St. Horlacher, S. Schötz, Hgg., 2020; GenderGraduateProjects IV – Kontinuitäten, Differenzen, Normierungen. Leipzig; Leipziger Universitätsverlag, S. 21-46. ISBN 978-3-96023-309-1
- C. Raasch: "Wie aus Gott Google wurde", tredition GmbH, Ahrensburg 2023
