= Ernst Anton Nicolai =

German physician and chemist (1722–1802)

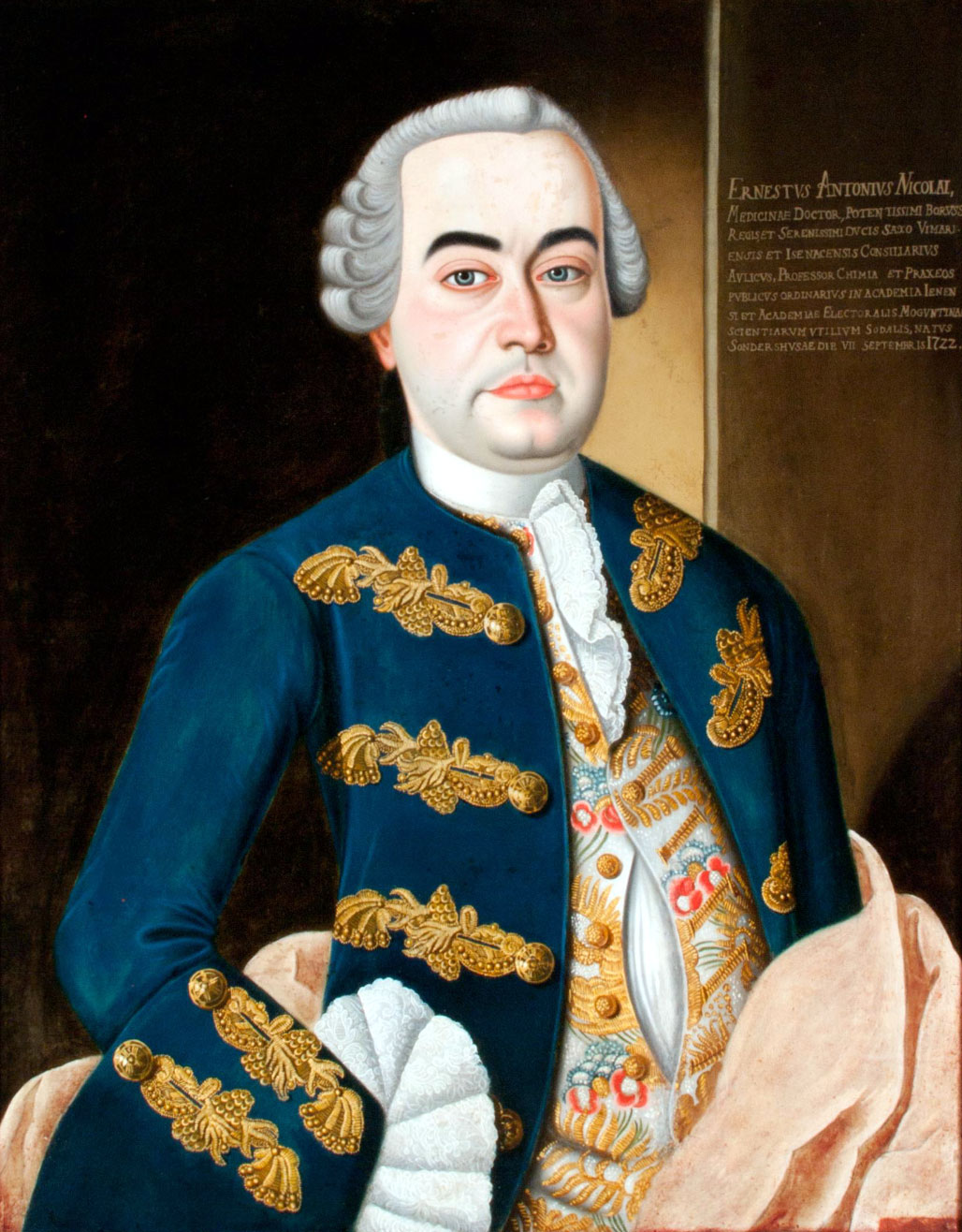
- Portrait by an unknown artist, c. 1800
- Born: 7 September 1722; Sondershausen, Germany
- Died: 28 August 1802 (aged 79); Jena, Germany
- Education: University of Halle
- Known for: Humorism, vitalism
- Scientific career
- Fields: Medicine, chemistry
- Workplaces: University of Halle, University of Jena
- Doctoral advisor: Johann Heinrich Schulze, Friedrich Hoffmann
- Doctoral students: Ernst Gottfried Baldinger

Ernst Anton Nicolai (7 September 1722 – 28 August 1802) was a German physician and chemist.

In 1745, Nicolai earned his medical doctorate from the University of Halle, where he was a disciple of Johann Heinrich Schulze and Friedrich Hoffmann. Soon afterwards, he obtained his habilitation in medicine, becoming an associate professor in 1748. At Halle, he gave lectures on theoretical subjects in the fields of pathology, physiology and pharmacology, later giving clinical lectures on diseases of the eye and childhood maladies.

In 1758, Nicolai was appointed professor of theoretical medicine at the University of Jena. During the following year, he became a professor of chemistry and clinical medicine at Jena, a position he held until his death in 1802. As a physician, he was a proponent of humoral pathology and the doctrine of vitalism. He was a follower of Leibniz' concept of monadism, reportedly seeking solutions to medical problems based on the philosophic viewpoints of Gottfried Leibniz.

== Published works ==
He was the author of many works, being published in Latin and German. The following are his principal works that were written in the German language:

- Die Verbindung der Musik mit der Artzneygelahrheit, 1745 – The connection of music with medical knowledge.
- Abhandlung Von Der Schönheit Des Menschlichen Körpers, 1746 – Treatise on the beauty of the human body.
- Versuch eines Lehrgebäudes von den Fiebern überhaupt, 1752.
- Pathologie oder Wissenschaft von Krankheiten, (several volumes, 1769–) – Pathology; the science of illness.
- Recepte und Kurarten nebst theoretisch-practischen Anmerkungen, 1789 – Prescriptions and remedies with theoretical-practical comments.
- Die trefflichsten Recepte und vorzüglichsten Kurarten der besten Aerzte aller Zeiten: mit theoretisch-praktischen Anmerkungen . Mayregg, Prag nach der 2. Aufl. in einen kernigten Auszug gebracht [1820] Digital edition by the University and State Library Düsseldorf
