= Johann Trommsdorff =

German chemist and pharmacist (1770–1837)

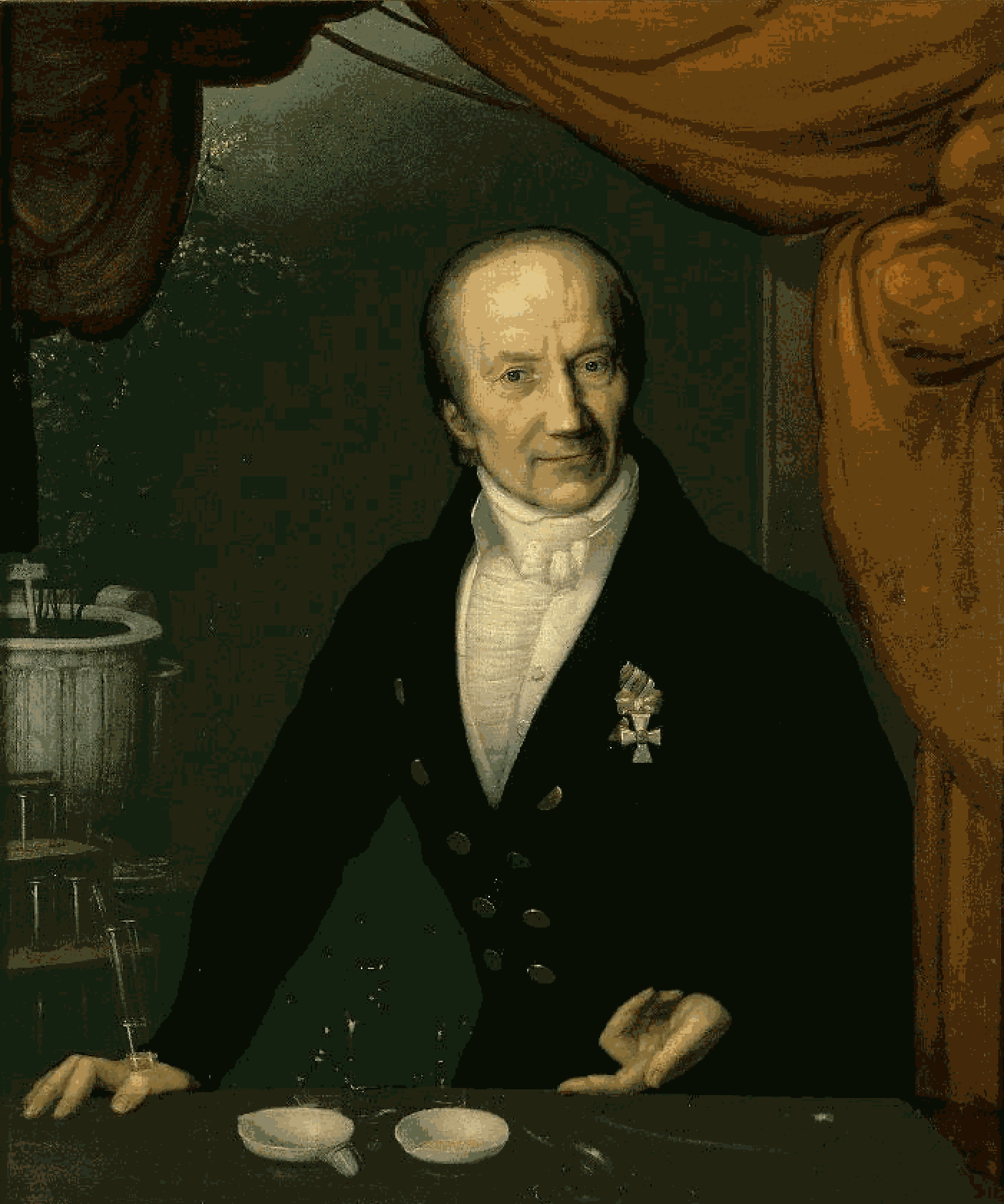
Johann Bartholomaeus Trommsdorff.

Johann Bartholomew (Bartholomäus) Trommsdorff (8 May 1770, Erfurt – 8 March 1837), was a German chemist and pharmacist noted for his 1805 Systematisches Handbuch der Gesammten Chemie (Systematic Handbook of the Whole of Chemistry); a work that was published in eight volumes.

He was the son of Wilhelm Bernhard Trommsdorff (1738–1782), a pharmacist and a chemistry teacher at the University of Erfurt. His father died when he was twelve, causing the family financial difficulties. In 1784, Johann began work as an apprentice-pharmacist at the Hofapotheke in Weimar under his father's friend Wilhelm Heinrich Sebastian Bucholz and Johann Friedrich August Göttling. From 1788, he furthered his education in Stettin and Stargard, returning to Erfurt in 1790, where he took charge of his late father's pharmacy, the Schwanen-Ring-Apotheke.

In 1795, he became an associate professor at the University of Erfurt, where he gave lectures in chemistry, mineralogy and pharmacy-dispensary (Rezeptierkunst). Shortly afterwards he founded the Chemisch-physikalisch-pharmaceutische Pensionsanstalt für Jünglinge, an establishment that is considered to be the first pharmaceutical institute in Germany. At the institute, prospective pharmacists were trained in physics, chemistry and pharmacy, and also given instruction in the fields of botany, zoology, mineralogy, mathematics and natural philosophy. More than 300 students attended between 1795 and 1828, helping to train an entire generation of chemical pharmacologists for the German drug industry.

Trommsdorff wrote monographs on a variety of chemical and pharmaceutical topics. In 1793, he was involved on the losing side in a scientific debate about the composition of mercuric oxide, siding with his childhood friend Friedrich Albrecht Carl Gren in Halle, and losing the argument to anti-phlogistonist Sigismund Friedrich Hermbstädt in Berlin. Trommsdorff also advocated for the establishment of a unified Naturphilosophen joining physics, chemistry, and natural history. By the 1800s, however, he had turned predominantly to empirical work. He published extensively, totaling over 400 works in his lifetime. His Journal der Pharmacie (1794–1834) was the primary periodical in the areas of pharmacy and pharmaceutical chemistry until 1832, when Annalen der Pharmacie was published by Justus von Liebig.

== Associated writings ==
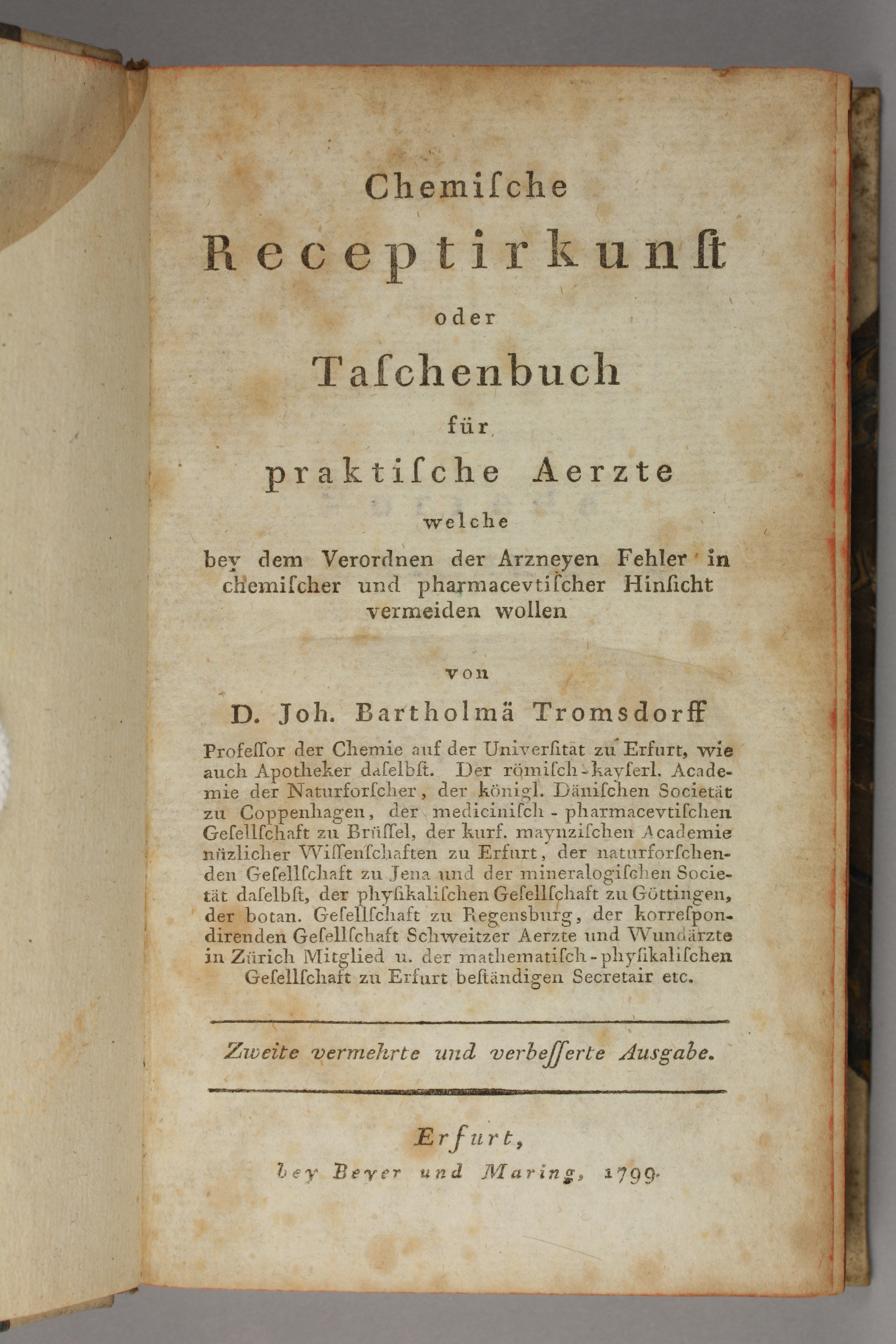
Chemische Receptirkunst, 1799, on pharmaceutical chemistry

- Kurzes Handbuch der Apothekerkunst : zum Gebrauch für Lernende . Kaffke, Stettin 1790 Digital edition by the University and State Library Düsseldorf
- Chemische Receptirkunst oder Taschenbuch für practische Aerzte, welche bey dem Verordnen der Arzneyen Fehler in chemischer und pharmaceutischer Hinsicht vermeiden wollen . Beyer und Maring, Erfurt 1797 Digital edition by the University and State Library Düsseldorf
- Systematisches Handbuch der gesammten Chemie - Systematic textbook of the whole of chemistry. Digital edition (Vol.1-5) by the University and State Library Düsseldorf
- Systematisches Handbuch der Pharmacie für angehende Aerzte und Apotheker 2. Ed. - Wien : Doll, 1816. Digital edition of the University and State Library Düsseldorf.
- Chemische Receptirkunst oder Taschenbuch für practische Aerzte, welche bey dem Verordnen der Arzneyen Fehler in chemischer und pharmaceutischer Hinsicht vermeiden wollen. Beyer und Maring, Erfurt 1797 Digital edition of the University and State Library Düsseldorf.
- Chemische Receptirkunst oder Taschenbuch für practische [praktische] Aerzte, welche bey dem Verordnen der Arzneyen Fehler in chemischer und pharmaceutischer Hinsicht vermeiden wollen. Beyer und Maring, Erfurt Zweite verm. und verb. Ausg. 1799 Digital edition of the University and State Library Düsseldorf.
- Die Apothekerschule, 1803 - The apothecary school.
- Handbuch der pharmaceutischen Waarenkunde : zum Gebrauch für Aerzte, Apotheker und Droguisten. Henning, Erfurt 1799 Digital edition of the University and State Library Düsseldorf.
- J. B. Trommsdorffs neues praktisches Arzneybuch für Aerzte, Wundärzte und Apotheker. Henning, Erfurt 1801 Digital edition of the University and State Library Düsseldorf.
- Gartenbuch für Aerzte und Apotheker zum Nutzen und Vergnügen mit 1 Kupfertafel . Hennings, Erfurt 2.Ausg. 1809 Digital edition of the University and State Library Düsseldorf.
- Lehrbuch der pharmaceutischen Experimentalchemie nach der neuern Theorie : zum Gebrauch für Ärzte und praktische Apotheker, und als Leitfaden zu Vorlesungen. 2nd ed. Vollmer, Hamburg 1803 Digital edition / 3rd ed. Pichler, Wien 1809 Digital edition of the University and State Library Düsseldorf.
- Neue Pharmacopoe, dem gegenwärtigen Zustande der Arzneikunde und Pharmacologie angemessen : nebst e. Anh., welcher die französische Militärpharmacopoe enthält. - 2. Aufl. - Erfurt : Henning, 1811. Digital edition of the University and State Library Düsseldorf.
- Die Grundsätze der Chemie, mit Berücksichtigung ihrer technischen Anwendung in einer Reihe allgemein faßlicher Vorlesungen entwickelt und durch Versuche erläutert : für Fabrikanten, Künstler und Gewerbtreibende; mit 6 Steindruck-Taf. Keyser, Erfurt 1829 Digital edition of the University and State Library Düsseldorf.
- Oestreichische Pharmacopöe. 3., verb. Ausg. Erfurt [u.a.] : Henning [u.a.], 1821. Digital edition of the University and State Library Düsseldorf.
- Der Briefwechsel von Johann Bartholomäus Trommsdorff (1770–1837) by Johann Bartholomäus Trommsdorff and Dr. Wolfgang Götz - The correspondence of Johann Bartholomäus Trommsdorff.

Works about Trommsdorff

- Johann Bartholomäus Trommsdorff (1770–1837) und die Begründung der modernen Pharmazie, Leipzig, Kommissionsverlag Johann Ambrosius Barth, 1972 - Part of the series: Beiträge zur Geschichte der Universität Erfurt (1392–1816), Heft 16.
