= Johann Christian Wiegleb =

German apothecary and early innovator of chemistry as a science (1732–1800)

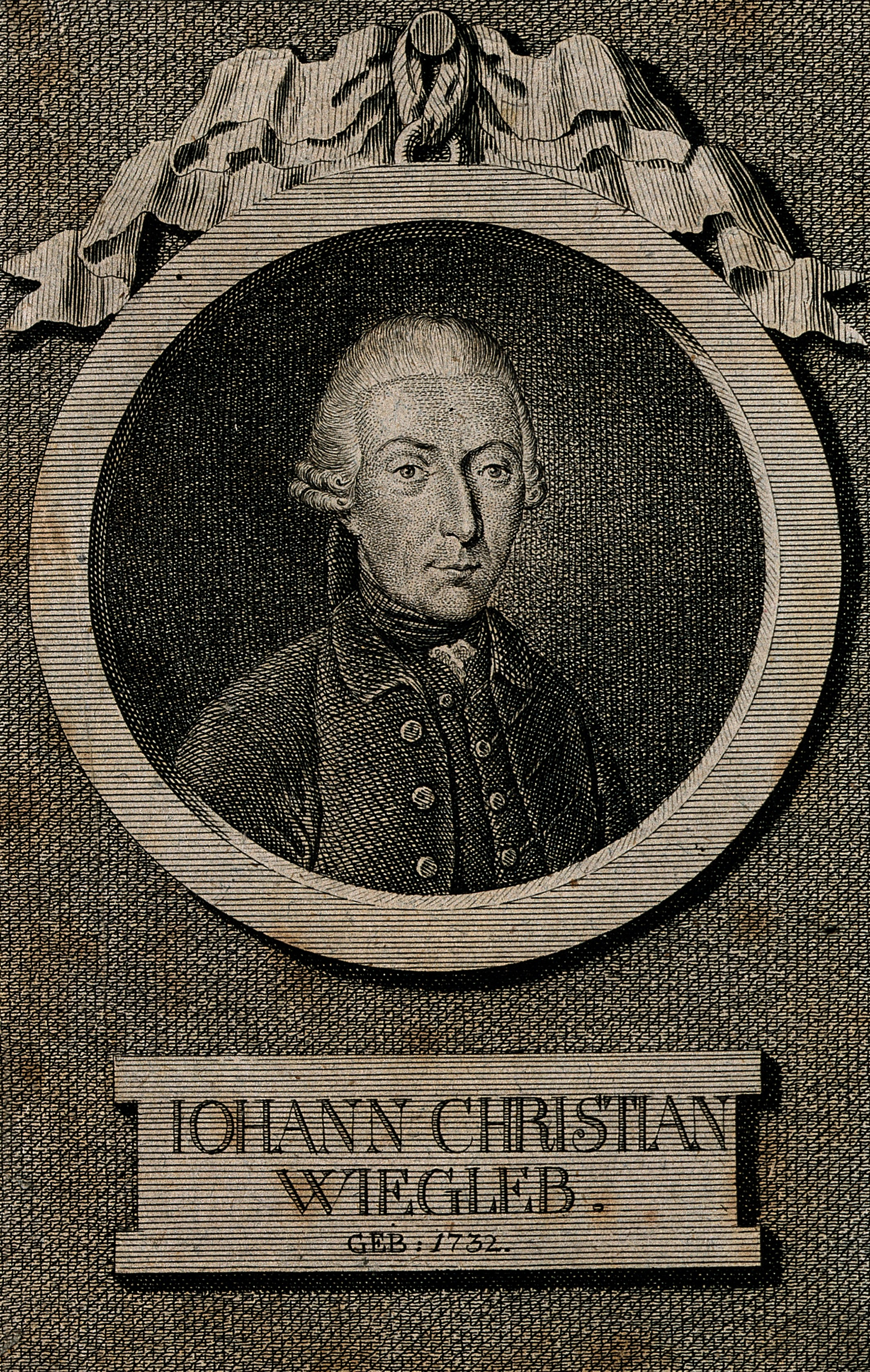
- Wiegleb (line engraving)
- Born: 21 December 1732; Langensalza, Electorate of Saxony
- Died: 16 January 1800 (aged 67); Langensalza, Electorate of Saxony (now Bad Langensalza, Germany)
- Scientific career
- Fields: Chemist
- Doctoral advisor: Ernst Gottfried Baldinger
- Doctoral students: Johann Friedrich August Göttling, Sigismund Friedrich Hermbstädt

Johann Christian Wiegleb (December 21, 1732 – January 16, 1800) was a notable German apothecary and early innovator of chemistry as a science.

== Life ==
Wiegleb, the son of a lawyer, was schooled in Langensalza. From 1748 to 1754, he served as an apprentice-apothecary in Dresden. Subsequently, from 1754 to 1755, he worked as an assistant in an apothecary in Quedlinburg. In 1759, he established his own apothecary in his hometown of Langensalza. He directed that apothecary until 1796. Furthermore, he was a senator and later treasurer of Langensalza.

Wiegleb was an influential scientist in the Age of Enlightenment. He possessed a wide knowledge of history, philosophy and different languages. He was the author, publisher, and translator of many works in the field of chemistry. His numerous studies on the chemical nature of minerals were usually published in Lorenz von Crell’s Chemische Annalen. His work on general chemistry was translated into English and published as "A general system of chemistry : theoretical and practical. digested and arranged, with a particular view to its application to the arts. taken chiefly from the German of M. Wiegleb" (by C.R. Hopson, M.D. 1789). Wiegleb was a member of the Kurmainzische Academy of useful sciences and the Leopoldina. In 1779, he founded a private institution for the training of apothecaries in Langensalza. That chemical-pharmaceutical institution was the first institution of its kind in Germany. It prepared the way for an academic education of apothecaries. Wiegleb was notably the teacher of Sigismund Friedrich Hermbstädt and Johann Friedrich August Göttling. They founded also chemical-pharmaceutical institutes after the model of Wiegleb.

The name of Wiegleb is associated with the discovery of oxalic acid in 1779. It turned out that it was identical with sugar acid, which was discovered by Carl Wilhelm Scheele in 1784. Wiegleb analyzed minerals, the formation of saltpetre on walls and the formation of silicic acid from the reaction of hydrofluoric acid and glass. He conducted studies of alkaline salts in plants, on the combustion of chalk and argued against the possibility of transmutation of elements. Particularly against the transformation of metals into gold using alchemical methods. At the end of his life, he became a follower of the phlogiston theory.

== Honours ==
1776 accommodation into Leopoldina

== Publications ==
- Chemische Versuche über die alkalischen Salze. Berlin 1774. digital edition from the University and State Library Sachsen-Anhalt, Halle (Saale).
- Neuer Begriff von der Gährung. Weimar 1776.
- Historisch-kritische Untersuchung der Alchemie oder der eingebildeten Goldmacherkunst, von ihrem Ursprunge sowohl als Fortgange, und was nun von ihr zu halten sey. Weimar 1777. digital edition from the Saxon State and University Library Dresden.
- Onomatologia curiosa, artificiosa et magica, oder natürliches Zauber-Lexicon, in welchem vieles Nützliche und Angenehme aus der Naturgeschichte, Naturlehre und natürlichen Magie nach alphabetischer Ordnung vorgetragen worden. - 3. Aufl./ verbessert u. mit vielen neuen Zusätzen vermehret von Johann Christian Wiegleb. Rasp, Nürnberg 1784 digital edition.
- Handbuch der allgemeinen Chemie. - 2., neuberichtigte Aufl. Nicolai, Berlin 1786. digital edition from the University and State Library Düsseldorf.
  - Volume 1
  - Volume 2
- Revision der Grundlehren von der chemischen Verwandtschaft der Körper. Crell´s Annalen 1785.
- Lehrbegriff vom Phlogiston. Crell´s Annalen 1785.
- Geschichte des Wachsthums und der Erfindungen in der Chemie in der neueren Zeit. Berlin 1790. digital edition from the Bavarian State Library.
- Deutsches Apothekerbuch: nach neuern und richtigern Kenntnissen in der Pharmakologie und Pharmacie bearbeitet Band 2. Ettinger, Gotha 1793. digital edition from University and State Library Düsseldorf.
  - Volume 1
  - Volume 2
- Deutsches Apothekerbuch: nach neuern und richtigern Kenntnissen in der Pharmakologie und Pharmacie. 2 Bände, Ettinger, Gotha 1797. digital edition from the University and State Library Düsseldorf.
  - Volume 1
  - Volume 2
- Remedia sympathetica: das ist Sammlung der bewährtesten und sympathetischen, antipathetischen und spagyrischen Mittel und Zauberkräfte bey Krankheiten der Menschen und Thiere, gegen Behexen und das Anthun böser Leute, gegen allerhand Laster, als Trunk und Spiel, für die gegenseitige Zärtlichkeit zwischen Eheleuten, verschiedene Jägerkünste, wider schädliche Thiere, Verwahrungsmittel wider Hieb und Stich u.s.w. Baltimore u.a., ca. 1840. digital edition from the University and State Library Düsseldorf.

== Bibliography ==
- Winfried Pötsch u.a. Lexikon bedeutender Chemiker. Harri Deutsch 1989
- Achim M. Klosa: Johann Christian Wiegleb (1732-1800) Eine Ergobiographie der Aufklärung. Wissenschaftliche Verlagsgesellschaft, Stuttgart 2009, ISBN 978-3-8047-2529-4.
