= Ernst Gottfried Baldinger =

German physician (1738–1804)

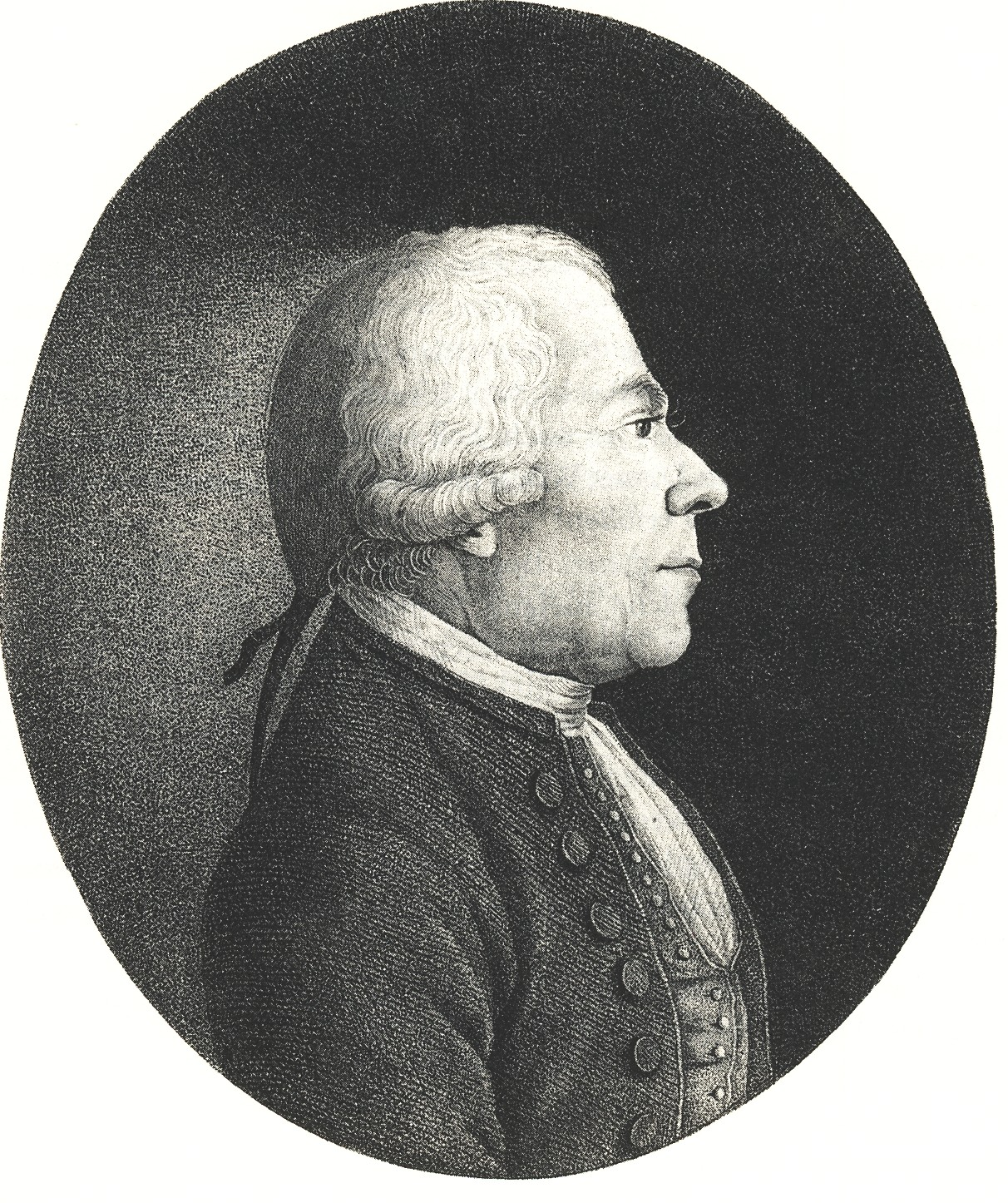
- Copper engraving of Baldinger by Konrad Westermeyer
- Born: 13 May 1738; Erfurt
- Died: 21 January 1804 (aged 65); Marburg
- Education: University of Erfurt; University of Halle; University of Jena
- Known for: De Militum Morbis (1765)
- Scientific career
- Fields: Medicine
- Workplaces: University of Göttingen; University of Marburg
- Doctoral advisor: Ernst Anton Nicolai
- Other academic advisors: Christoph Mangold
- Doctoral students: Samuel Thomas von Sömmerring; Johann Friedrich Blumenbach; Johann Christian Gottlieb Ackermann; Johann Christian Wiegleb

Ernst Gottfried Baldinger (13 May 1738 – 21 January 1804), German physician, was born in Großvargula near Erfurt.

He studied medicine at Erfurt, Halle and Jena, earning his MD in 1760 under the guidance of Ernst Anton Nicolai and in 1761 was entrusted with the superintendence of the military hospitals connected with the Prussian encampment near Torgau.

He published a treatise in 1765, De Militum Morbis, which met with a favourable reception. In 1768, he became professor of medicine at Jena, which he left in 1773 for Göttingen, and in 1785 he moved to Marburg, where he died of apoplexy on 21 January 1804.

Among his pupils were Johann Friedrich Blumenbach, Samuel Thomas von Sömmerring, Albrecht Thaer, and Johann Christian Wiegleb. He wrote approximately 84 separate treatises, in addition to numerous papers scattered through various collections and journals. He corresponded with Swedish botanist Carl Linnaeus and was the author of some plant names. He was the editor of Auszüge aus den neuesten Dissertationen über die Naturlehre, Arzneiwissenschaft und alle Theile derselben

== Works ==
partial list

- 1769-1778 Pallas, P. S., Erxleben, J. C. P., Baldinger, E. G. [full title] Peter Simon Pallas Naturgeschichte merkwuerdiger Thiere, in welcher vornehmlich neue und unbekannte Thierarten durch Kupferstiche, Beschreibungen und Erklaerungen erlaeutert werden. Durch den Verfasser verteutscht. I. Band 1 bis 10te Sammlung mit Kupfern. Berlin und Stralsund, G. A. Lange (Samml. 1-10), 48 Taf.
- 1783-1785 Historia mercurii et mercurialium medica (Volume 1/2) Digital edition by the University and State Library Düsseldorf

== Bibliography ==
- Chisholm, Hugh, ed. (1911). "Baldinger, Ernst Gottfried" . Encyclopædia Britannica (11th ed.). Cambridge University Press.
