= Christoph Mangold =

German physician and chemist (1719–1767)

Christoph Andreas Mangold
- Born: 1719; Erfurt, Electorate of Mainz
- Died: 1767 (aged 47–48); Erfurt, Electorate of Mainz
- Education: University of Erfurt
- Known for: Medical diagnosis, studies of gunpowder and cinnabar
- Scientific career
- Fields: Medicine, anatomy, chemistry
- Workplaces: University of Jena
- Doctoral advisor: Georg Erhard Hamberger
- Notable students: Ernst Gottfried Baldinger

Christoph Andreas Mangold (1719, Erfurt – 2 July 1767, Erfurt) was a German professor of anatomy at the University of Jena (at the time part of Saxe-Weimar), who also studied chemistry.

Christoph Mangold received his Doctor of Medicine degree from the University of Erfurt in 1751. He was a member of the Academie der Wissenschaften of Erfurt.

Mangold is known for his studies of gunpowder and cinnabar as well as the idea that medical diagnosis should be based upon symptoms, laboratory tests, and comparisons with other patients. He was notably the advisor of Ernst Gottfried Baldinger.

== Works ==
- Chymische Erfahrungen und Vortheile in Bereitung einiger sehr bewährter Arzneymittel : nebst verschiedenen physicalischen Anmerkungen über dieselben . Nonne, Erfurt 1748 Digital edition by the University and State Library Düsseldorf
- Fortgesetzte chymische Erfahrungen und Vortheile : bestehend vornemlich in einer gründlicheen und abgenöthigten Widerlegung der bisher siegenden, nunmehr aber in letzten Zügen liegenden Chymie des Herrtn Prof. Ludolffs, und in einigen in der Arzneykunst nützlichen Versuchen . Beumelburg, Frankfurt [u.a.] 1749 Digital edition by the University and State Library Düsseldorf
