= Johann Friedrich Blumenbach =

German physiologist and anthropologist (1752–1840)

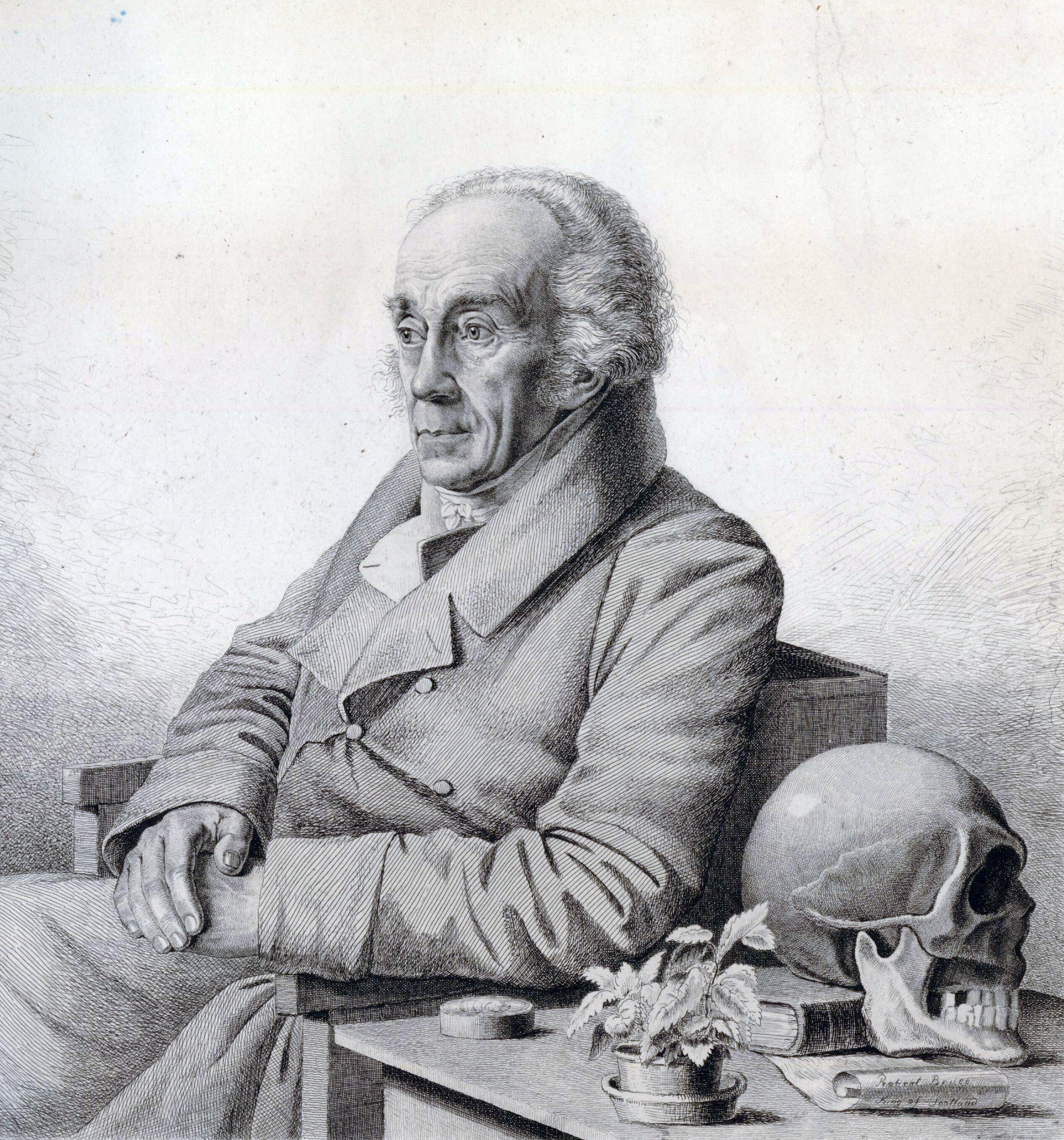
- Engraving by Ludwig Emil Grimm
- Born: 11 May 1752; Gotha, Saxe-Gotha-Altenburg
- Died: 22 January 1840 (aged 87); Göttingen, Kingdom of Hanover
- Education: University of Jena; University of Göttingen
- Known for: Comparative anatomy; work cited in scientific racism
- Scientific career
- Fields: Physiology
- Workplaces: University of Göttingen
- Doctoral advisor: Christian Wilhelm Büttner
- Other academic advisors: Ernst Gottfried Baldinger; Christian Gottlob Heyne
- Doctoral students: Johann Heinrich Friedrich Link; Karl Theodor Ernst von Siebold
- Author abbrev. (zoology): Blumenbach

Johann Friedrich Blumenbach (German: [ˈbluːmənˌbax]; 11 May 1752 – 22 January 1840) was a German medical doctor, naturalist, physiologist, and anthropologist. He is considered to be a main founder of zoology and anthropology as comparative, scientific disciplines. He has been called the "founder of racial classifications".

He was one of the first to explore the study of the human being as an aspect of natural history. His teachings in comparative anatomy were applied to his classification of human races, of which he claimed there were five: Caucasian, Mongolian, Malayan, Ethiopian, and American. He was a member of what modern historians call the Göttingen school of history.

He is considered a pivotal figure in the development of physical anthropology. Blumenbach's peers considered him one of the great theorists of his day, and he was a mentor or influence on many of the next generation of German biologists, including Alexander von Humboldt.

== Early life and education ==
Blumenbach was born at his family house in Gotha. His father was Heinrich Blumenbach, a local school headmaster; his mother was Charlotte Eleonore Hedwig Buddeus. He was born into a well-connected family of academics.

Blumenbach was educated at the Illustrious Gymnasium in Gotha before studying medicine, first at Jena and then at Göttingen. He was recognized as a prodigy by the age sixteen in 1768. He graduated from the latter in 1775 with his M.D. thesis De generis humani varietate nativa (On the Natural Variety of Mankind, University of Göttingen, which was first published in 1775, then re-issued with changes to the titlepage in 1776). It is considered one of the most influential works in the development of subsequent human race concepts. It contained the germ of the craniological research to which so many of his subsequent inquiries were directed.

== Career ==
Blumenbach was appointed extraordinary professor of medicine and inspector of the museum of natural history in Göttingen in 1776 and ordinary professor in 1778. His contributions soon began to enrich the pages of the Medicinische Bibliothek, of which he was editor from 1780 to 1794, with various contributions on medicine, physiology, and anatomy. In physiology, he was of the school of Albrecht von Haller, and was in the habit of illustrating his theory by a careful comparison of the animal functions of man with those of other animals. Following Georges Cuvier's identification, Blumenbach gave the woolly mammoth its first scientific name, Elephas primigenius (first-born elephant), in 1799.

His reputation was much extended by the publication of his Institutiones Physiologicae (1787), a condensed, well-arranged view of the animal functions, expounded without discussion of minute anatomical details. Between its first publication and 1821, it went through many editions in Germany, where it was the general textbook of the science of physiology. It was translated into English in America by Charles Caldwell (Philadelphia 1798), and in London by John Elliotson (1807).

He was perhaps still more extensively known by his Handbuch der vergleichenden Anatomie ("Handbook of comparative anatomy"), which passed through numerous German editions from its appearance in 1805 to 1824. It was translated into English in 1809 by the surgeon William Lawrence, and again, with improvements and additions, by William Coulson in 1827. This manual, though slighter than the subsequent works of Cuvier, Carus, and others, and not to be compared with such later expositions as that of Gegenbaur, was long esteemed for the accuracy of the author's own observations, and his just appreciation of the labors of his predecessors. Although the greatest part of Blumenbach's life was passed at Göttingen, in 1789 he visited Switzerland, and gave a curious medical topography of that country in the Bibliothek. He travelled to England in 1788 and 1792. He was elected a Foreign Member of the Royal Society of London in 1793 and a Foreign Honorary Member of the American Academy of Arts and Sciences in 1794. In 1798, he was elected as a member to the American Philosophical Society. He became a correspondent, living abroad, of the Royal Institute of the Netherlands in 1808. This was changed to associated member in 1827. He was then appointed secretary to the Royal Society of Sciences in 1812, elected a foreign member of the Royal Swedish Academy of Sciences in 1813, appointed physician to the royal family in Hanover (German: Obermedizinalrat) by the prince regent in 1816, made a knight-commander of the Guelphic Order in 1821, and elected a member of the French Academy of Sciences in 1831. In celebration of his doctoral jubilee (1825), traveling scholarships were founded to assist talented young physicians and naturalists. He retired in 1835. Blumenbach died in 1840 in Göttingen, where he is buried in the Albani cemetery.

=== Racial anthropology ===
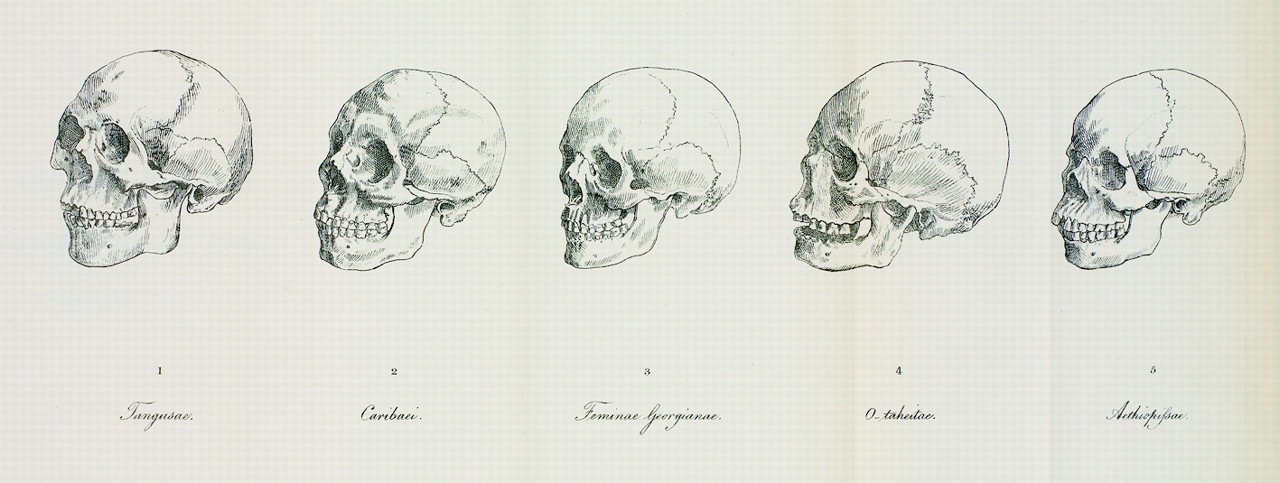
Blumenbach's five races

Blumenbach explored alleged racial differences in humans mainly by comparing skull anatomy and skin color. His work included a description of sixty human crania (skulls) published originally in fascicules as Decas craniorum (Göttingen, 1790–1828). This was a founding work for other scientists in the field of craniometry. He established a five-part naming system in 1795 to describe what he called generis humani varietates quinae principes, species vero unica (five principal varieties of humankind, but one species). In his view, humans could be divided into varieties (only in his later work he adopted the term "races", which had been introduced by others) but he was aware that a clear separation was difficult:

"All national differences in the form and colour of the human body […] run so insensibly, by so many shades and transitions one into the other, that it is impossible to separate them by any but very arbitrary limits."

Blumenbach's classification of the single human species into five varieties (later called "races") (1793/1795):

- the Caucasian or white race. Blumenbach was the first to use this term for Europeans, but the term would later be reinterpreted to also include Middle Easterners and South Asians.
- the Mongolian or yellow race, including all East Asians.
- the Malayan or brown race, including Southeast Asians and Pacific Islanders.
- the Ethiopian or black race, including all sub-Saharan Africans.
- the American or red race, including all Native Americans.

Blumenbach assumed that all morphological differences between the varieties were induced by the climate and the way of living and he emphasized that the differences in morphology were so small, gradual and transiently connected that it was not possible to separate these varieties clearly. He also noted that skin color was unsuitable for distinguishing varieties. Although Blumenbach did not propose any hierarchy among the five varieties, he placed the Caucasian form in the center of his description as being the most "primitive" or "primeval" one from which the other forms "degenerated". In the 18th century, however, these terms did not have the negative connotations they possess today. At the time, "primitive" or "primeval" described the ancestral form, while "degeneration" was understood to be the process of change leading to a variety adapted to a new environment by being exposed to a different climate and diet. Hence, he argued that physical characteristics like skin color, cranial profile, etc., depended on geography, diet, and mannerism. Further anatomical study led him to the conclusion that "individual Africans differ as much, or even more, from other Africans as from Europeans".

Like other monogenists such as Georges-Louis Leclerc, Comte de Buffon, Blumenbach held to the "degenerative hypothesis" of racial origins. Blumenbach claimed that Adam and Eve were Caucasian inhabitants of Asia, and that other races came about by degeneration from environmental factors such as the sun and poor diet. Thus, he claimed, African pigmentation arose as a result of the heat of the tropical sun, while the cold wind caused the tawny colour of the Inuit, and the Chinese were fair skinned compared to the other Asian people because they kept mostly in towns protected from environmental factors. He believed that the degeneration could be reversed in a proper environmental control and that all contemporary forms of man could revert to the original Caucasian race.

Moreover, he concluded that Africans were not inferior to the rest of mankind "concerning healthy faculties of understanding, excellent natural talents and mental capacities":

"Finally, I am of opinion that after all these numerous instances I have brought together of negroes of capacity, it would not be difficult to mention entire well-known provinces of Europe, from out of which you would not easily expect to obtain off-hand such good authors, poets, philosophers, and correspondents of the Paris Academy; and on the other hand, there is no so-called savage nation known under the sun which has so much distinguished itself by such examples of perfectibility and original capacity for scientific culture, and thereby attached itself so closely to the most civilized nations of the earth, as the Negro."

He did not consider his "degenerative hypothesis" as racist and sharply criticized Christoph Meiners, an early practitioner of scientific racialism, as well as Samuel Thomas von Sömmerring, who concluded from autopsies that Africans were an inferior race. Blumenbach wrote three other essays stating non-white peoples were capable of excelling in arts and sciences in reaction against racialists of his time. At his time, Blumenbach was perceived as anti-racist and he strongly opposed the practice of slavery and the belief of the inherent savagery of the coloured races. Alexander von Humboldt wrote on his and Blumenbach's views:

"While we maintain the unity of the human species, we at the same time repel the depressing assumption of superior and inferior races."

However, selected parts of his views were later used by others to encourage scientific racism.

=== Other natural studies ===
In his dissertation, Blumenbach mentioned the name Simia troglodytes in connection with a short description for the chimpanzee. This dissertation was printed and appeared in September 1775, but only for internal use in the University of Göttingen and not for providing a public record. The public print of his dissertation appeared in 1776. Blumenbach knew that Carl Linnaeus had already established a name Homo troglodytes for a badly known primate. In 1779, he discussed this Linnean name and concluded correctly that Linnaeus had been dealing with two species, a human and an orangutan, neither of which was a chimpanzee, and that by consequence the name Homo troglodytes could not be used. Blumenbach was one of the first scientists to understand the identities of the different species of primates, which were (excluding humans) orangutans and chimpanzees. (Gorillas were not known to Europeans at this time). In Opinion 1368, the International Commission on Zoological Nomenclature (ICZN) decided in 1985 that Blumenbach's view should be followed, and that his Simia troglodytes as published by Blumenbach in 1779 shall be the type species of the genus Pan and, since it was the oldest available name for the chimpanzee, be used for this species. However, the commission did not know that Blumenbach had already mentioned this name in his dissertation. Following the rules of the ICZN Code the scientific name of one of the most well-known African animals, currently known as Pan troglodytes, must carry Blumenbach's name combined with the date 1776.

Blumenbach shortly afterward wrote a manual of natural history entitled Handbuch der Naturgeschichte; 12 editions and some translations. It was published first in Göttingen by J. C. Dieterich in 1779/1780. He was also one of the first scientists to study the anatomy of the platypus, assigning the scientific name Ornithorhynchus paradoxus to the animal, being unaware George Shaw had already given it the name Platypus anatinus. However, Platypus had already been shown to be used for the scientific name for a genus of Ambrosia beetles so Blumenbach's scientific name for the genus was used.

He described the first fossil brittle star in 1804, Aspiduriella scutellata†, in Specimen archaeologiae telluris terrarumque inprimis Hannoveranarum.

=== Bildungstrieb ===
Blumenbach made many contributions to the scientific debates of the last half of the 18th century regarding evolution and creation. His central contribution was in the conception of a vis formativa or Bildungstrieb, an inborn force within an organism that led it to create, maintain, and repair its shape.

==== Background ====
Enlightenment science and philosophy essentially held a static view of nature and man, but vital nature continued to interrupt this view, and the issue of life, the creation of life and its varieties, increasingly occupied attention and "starting in the 1740s the concept of vital power reentered the scene of generation ... there must be some 'productive power' in nature that enabled unorganized material to generate new living forms."

Georges-Louis Leclerc, Comte de Buffon wrote an influential work in 1749, Natural History, that revived interest in vital nature. Buffon held that there were certain penetrating powers which organised the organic particles that made up the living organism. Erasmus Darwin translated Buffon's idea of organic particles into "molecules with formative propensities" and in Germany Buffon's idea of an internal order, moule interieur arising out of the action of the penetrating powers was translated into German as Kraft (power).

The German term for vital power or living power, Lebenskraft, as distinct from chemical or physical forces, first appeared with Medicus's on the Lebenskraft (1774). Scientists were now forced to consider hidden and mysterious powers of and in living matter that resisted physical laws – warm-blooded animals maintaining a consistent temperature despite changing outside temperatures, for example.

In 1759, Caspar Friedrich Wolff, a German embryologist provided evidence for the ancient idea of epigenesis, that is preformed life, that is a chick out of unformed substance and his dispute with Albrecht von Haller brought the issue of life to the forefront of natural science and philosophy. Wolff identified an "essential power" (essentliche Kraft, or vis essentialis) that allowed structure to be a result of power, "the very power through which, in the vegetable body, all those things which we describe as life are effected."

==== Blumenbach's Bildungstrieb ====
While Wolff was not concerned to name this vital organising, reproducing power, in 1780 Blumenbach posited a formative drive (nisus formativus or Bildungstrieb) responsible for biological "procreation, nourishment, and reproduction", as well as self-development and self-perfection on a cultural level.

Blumenbach held that all living organisms "from man down to maggots, and from the cedar to common mould or mucor", possess an inherent "effort or tendency which, while life continues, is active and operative; in the first instance to attain the definite form of the species, then to preserve it entire, and, when it is infringed upon, so far as this is possible, to restore it." This power of vitality is "not referable to any qualities merely physical, chemical, or mechanical."

Blumenbach compared the uncertainty about the origin and ultimate nature of the formative drive to similar uncertainties about gravitational attraction: "just in the same way as we use the name of attraction or gravity to denote certain forces, the causes of which however still remain hid, as they say, in Cimmerian darkness, the formative force (nisus formativus) can explain the generation of animals."

At the same time, befitting the central idea of the science and medicine of dynamic polarity, it was also the physiological functional identity of what theorists of society or mind called "aspiration". Blumenbach's Bildungstrieb found quick passage into evolutionary theorizing of the decade following its formulation and in the thinking of the German natural philosophers.

One of Blumenbach's contemporaries, Samuel Hahnemann, undertook to study in detail how this generative, reproductive and creative power, which he termed the Erzeugungskraft of the Lebenskraft of living power of the organism, could be negatively affected by inimical agents to engender disease.

==== Blumenbach and Kant on Bildungstrieb ====
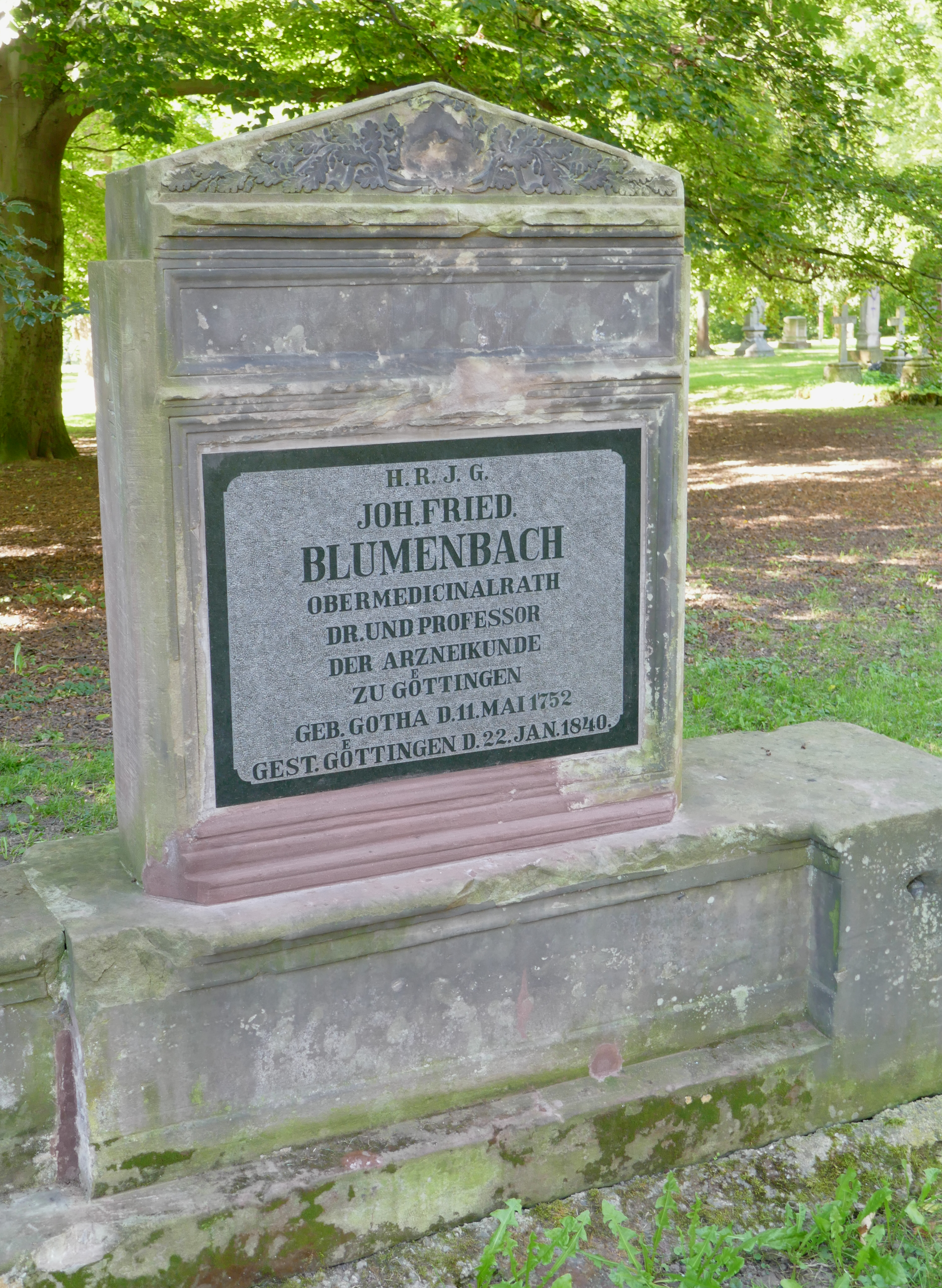
Blumenbach's gravestone

Kant is said by several modern authors to have relied on Blumenbach's biological concept of formative power in developing his idea of organic purpose. Kant wrote to Blumenbach in 1790 to praise his concept of the formative force (Bildungstrieb). However, whereas Kant had a heuristic concept in mind, to explain mechanical causes, Blumenbach conceived of a cause fully resident in nature. From this he would argue that the Bildungstrieb was central to the creation of new species. Though Blumenbach left no overt indications of sources for his theory of biological revolution, his ideas harmonize with those of Charles Bonnet and especially with those of his contemporary Johann Gottfried Herder (1744–1803), and it was Herder whose ideas were influenced by Blumenbach. Blumenbach continued to refine the concept in his De nisu formativo et generationis negotio ('On the Formative Drive and the Operation of Generation', 1787) and in the second edition (1788) of the Handbuch der Naturgeschichte: 'it is a proper force (eigentliche Kraft), whose undeniable existence and extensive effects are apparent throughout the whole of nature and revealed by experience'. He consolidated these in the second edition of Über den Bildungstrieb.

Blumenbach had initially been an advocate of Haller's view, in contrast to those of Wolff, that the essential elements of the embryo were already in the egg, he later sided with Wolff. Blumenbach provided evidence for the actual existence of this formative force, to distinguish it from other, merely nominal terms.

The way in which the Bildungstrieb differed, perhaps, from other such forces was in its comprehensive architectonic character: it directed the formation of anatomical structures and the operations of physiological processes of the organism so that various parts would come into existence and function interactively to achieve the ends of the species.

== Influence on German biology ==
Blumenbach was regarded as a leading light of German science by his contemporaries. Kant and Friedrich Schelling both called him "one of the most profound biological theorists of the modern era." In the words of science historian Peter Watson, "roughly half the German biologists during the early nineteenth century studied under him or were inspired by him: Alexander von Humboldt, Carl Friedrich Kielmeyer, Gottfried Reinhold Treviranus, Heinrich Friedrich Link, Johann Friedrich Meckel, Johannes Illiger, and Rudolph Wagner."

== See also ==
- Craniometry
- Scientific racism
