= Wilhelm Heinrich Sebastian Bucholz =

German chemist and pharmacist (1734–1798)

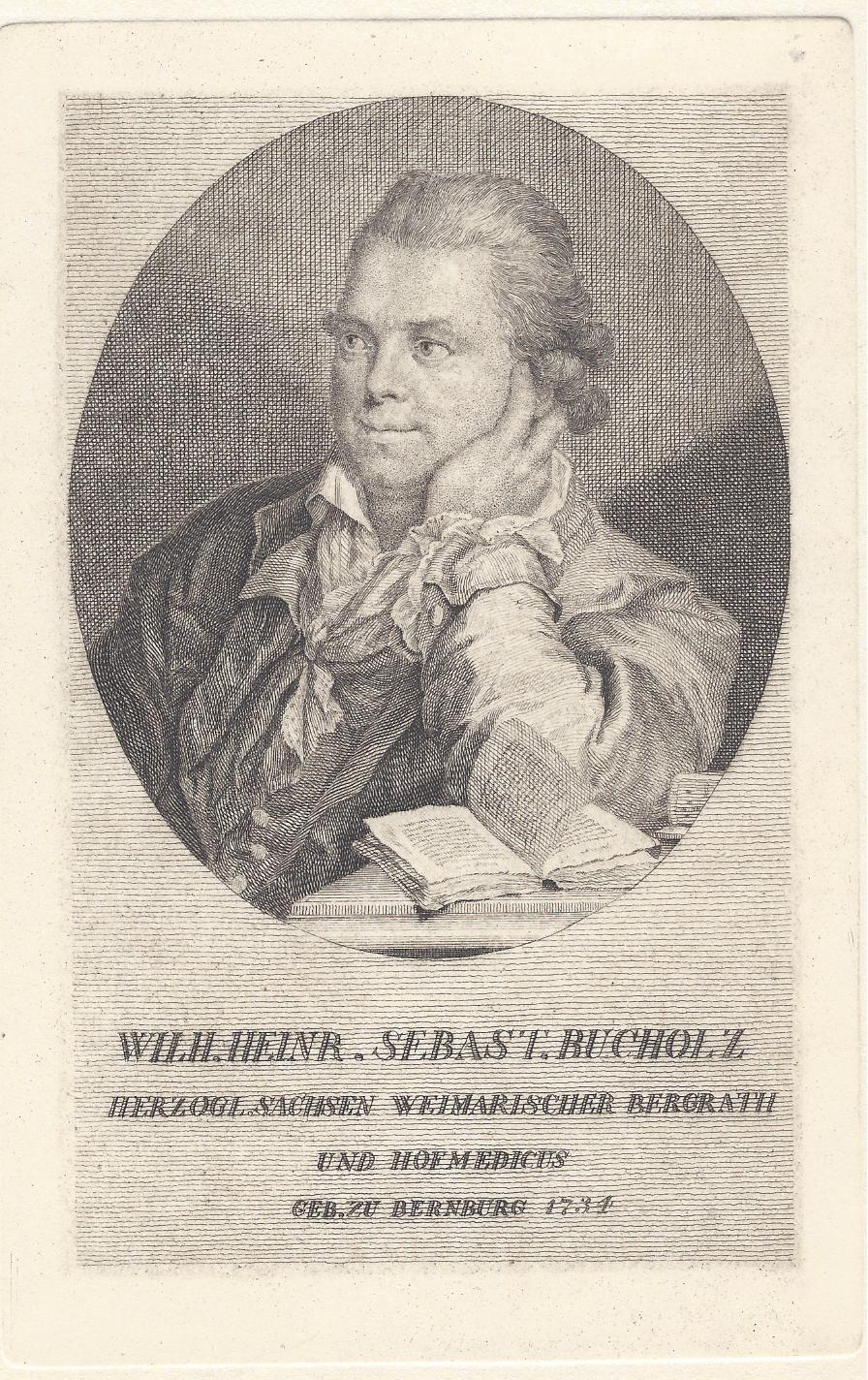
- Wilhelm Heinrich Sebastian Bucholz
- Born: 23 December 1734; Bernburg, Anhalt-Bernburg
- Died: 16 December 1798 (aged 63); Weimar
- Occupation: German pharmacist

Wilhelm Heinrich Sebastian Bucholz (23 December 1734, Bernburg – 16 December 1798) was a German pharmacist and chemist.

Trained as a pharmacist in Magdeburg and Weimar, he later studied medicine at the University of Jena, where he obtained his doctorate in 1764. Several years later, he became head of the Hofapotheke (court pharmacy) in Weimar. Here, Johann Friedrich August Göttling worked as his assistant and Johann Trommsdorff served as an apprentice. As his career progressed, he received the posts of Hof-Medikus (court physician, 1777) and Bergrat (counsellor of mines, 1782).

He was a friend and consultant to Johann Wolfgang von Goethe on the matter of scientific issues. Goethe observed Bucholz's attempt to build a Montgolfier balloon. Reportedly, the two men conducted water purification experiments through the use of powdered charcoal. Bucholz remained an honored member of Goethe's Freitagsgesellschaft up until his death in 1798.

== Selected works ==
- Chymische Versuche über einige der neuesten einheimischen antiseptischen Substanzen, 1776 – Chemical experiments on some of the latest local antiseptic substances.
- Bartlet's Pharmacopee oder Apotheke eines Rossarztes, 1778 – "Pharmacopoeia Bartleiana".
- Beyträge zur gerichtlichen Arzneygelahrheit und zur medicinischen Polizey, 1782.
