= Georg Wolfgang Wedel =

German professor (1645–1721)

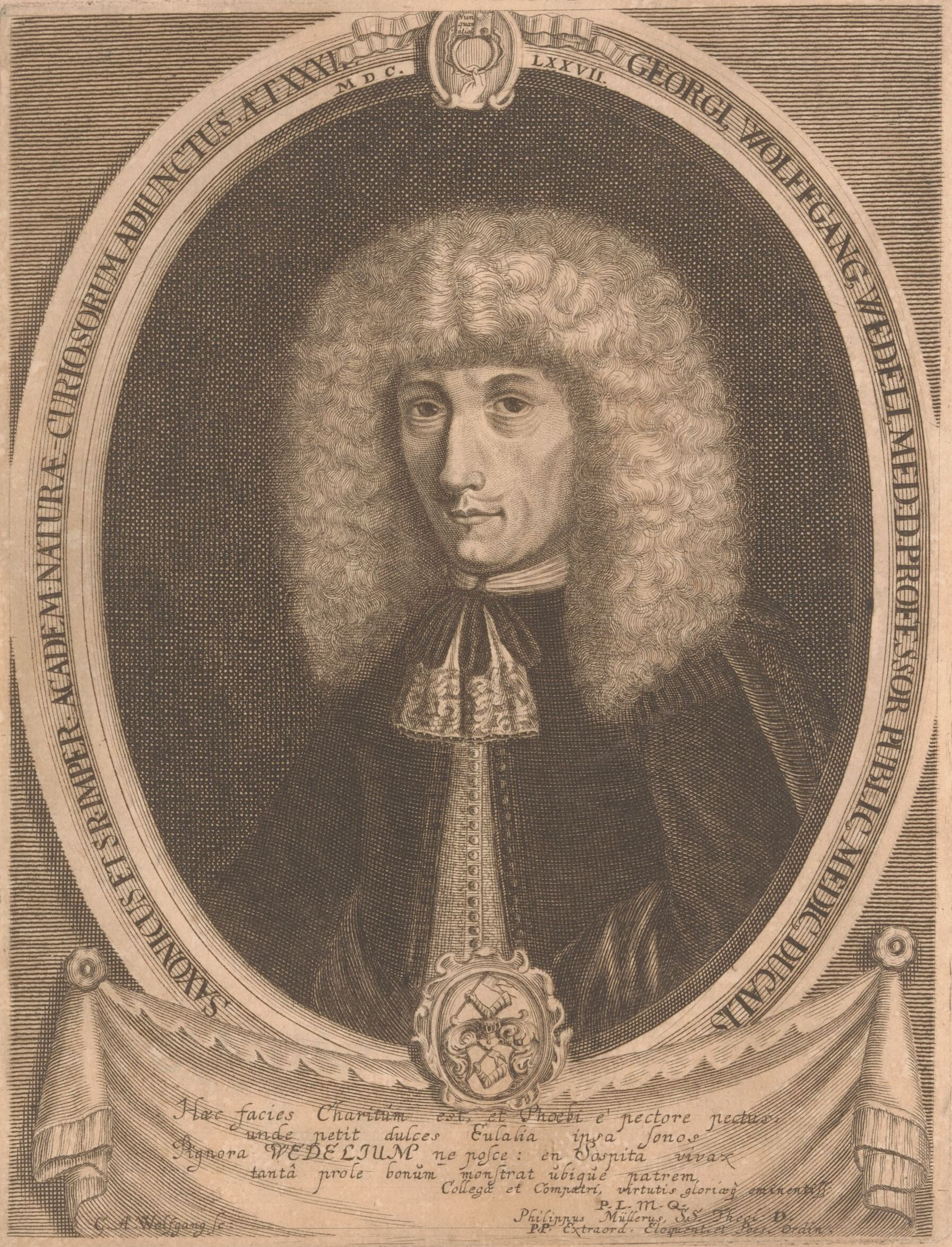
- Born: 12 November 1645; Golßen, Niederlausitz, Habsburg monarchy
- Died: 6 September 1721 (aged 75); Jena, Saxe-Weimar
- Education: University of Jena
- Known for: Alchemy, pharmaceutical chemistry
- Scientific career
- Fields: Medicine, chemistry, philosophy
- Workplaces: University of Jena
- Doctoral advisor: Werner Rolfinck
- Doctoral students: Johann Adolph Wedel

Georg Wolfgang Wedel (German: [ˈveːdl̩]; 12 November 1645 – 6 September 1721) was a German professor of surgery, botany, theoretical and practical medicine, and chemistry.

== Biography ==
Wedel was born in Golßen, Niederlausitz, and received his Doctor of Medicine degree from the University of Jena in 1669.

He published research on alchemy and pharmaceutical chemistry. He studied the plating of copper onto iron using a solution of copper sulfate and volatile salts obtained from plants. Wedel also invented new medicines and produced a translated German edition of the Greek Bible.

Wedel's sons, Ernst Heinrich Wedel (1 August 1671 – 13 April 1709) and Johann Adolph Wedel (1675–1747) were also physicians.

== Works ==
- Opiologia ad mentem Acadamiae Naturae Curiosorum . Johannis Fritschii, Jenae 1674.
- Georgii Wolffgangi Wedelii pharmacia acroamatica . Bielcke / Krebs, Jenae 1686 Digital edition by the University and State Library Düsseldorf
- Syllabus Materiae Medicae Selectioris. Bielcke / Krebs, Jenae 1701 Digital edition of the University and State Library Düsseldorf.
- Georgii Wolffgangi Wedelii amoenitates materiae medicae.Bielcke, Jenae; Werther, Jenae 1704 Digital edition of the University and State Library Düsseldorf.
- Georgii Wolffgangi Wedelii compendium chimiae, theoreticae et practicae, methodo analyticae propositae . Bielcke / Krebs, Jenae 1715 Digital edition by the University and State Library Düsseldorf
