= Karl Wilhelm Gottlob Kastner =

German chemist (1783–1857)

Karl Kastner
- Born: 31 October 1783; Greifenberg in Pommern, Pomerania, Kingdom of Prussia, Holy Roman Empire (present-day Gryfice, West Pomeranian Voivodeship, Poland)
- Died: 13 July 1857 (aged 73); Erlangen, Kingdom of Bavaria, German Confederation
- Education: University of Jena
- Known for: Chemistry textbooks
- Scientific career
- Fields: Chemistry
- Workplaces: University of Jena; University of Halle; University of Bonn; University of Erlangen
- Doctoral advisor: Johann Friedrich August Gottling
- Doctoral students: Justus von Liebig

Karl Wilhelm Gottlob Kastner (31 October 1783 – 13 July 1857) was a German chemist, natural scientist and a professor of physics and chemistry.

== Biography ==
Kastner received his doctorate in 1805 under the guidance of Johann Göttling and began lecturing at the University of Jena. He moved on to become professor at the University of Halle in 1812. In 1818 he relocated to the University of Bonn, where he would mentor famous chemist Justus Liebig. He then moved on to the University of Erlangen in the summer of 1821, where he would remain for the rest of his professional life.

Karl Wilhelm Gottlob Kastner was born in Greifenberg in Pommern as the son of Johann Friedrich Gottlob Kastner, who was teacher and headmaster at the school of Greifenberg and a Protestant pastor. After his father had been displaced to Swinemünde, Kastner started his vocational education at a pharmacy in 1798. Three years later, he travelled to Berlin, to work as assistant of a pharmacist and to visit lectures at the University of Berlin. In 1802 Kastner became an assistant of professor Bourgnet’s lectures of experimental physics and experimental chemistry. In 1804 he began studying natural sciences at the University of Jena. During his studies he already lectured chemistry. Kastner received his doctorate in 1805 under the guidance of Johann Göttling and began lecturing at the University of Jena. In the same year he moved on to the University of Heidelberg to lecture physics and chemistry. He became professor at the University of Halle in 1812. In 1812 to 1813 he interrupted his teaching activities to make voluntary military service as supervisor and doctor of four hospitals. In 1818 he relocated to the University of Bonn. There he became elected dean of the philosophical faculty. In 1821 he moved on again, partly for political reasons, to the University of Erlangen, where he remained for the remainder of his professional life. There he also lectured physics and chemistry. Liebig, who had come to Bonn to study with Kastner, followed him to Erlangen and received his doctorate in 1822. Kastner also helped Liebig receive a grant from Ludwig I, the Grand Duke of Hesse-Darmstadt, to study under Gay-Lussac in Paris.

Many of Kastner's academic positions required not only the teaching of chemistry, but also mathematics, zoology, physics, mineralogy, geology, and pharmacy.

Kastner is best known today as the teacher of chemist Justus von Liebig.

== See also ==
- List of chemists
