= Friedrich Hoffmann =

German physician and chemist (1660–1742)

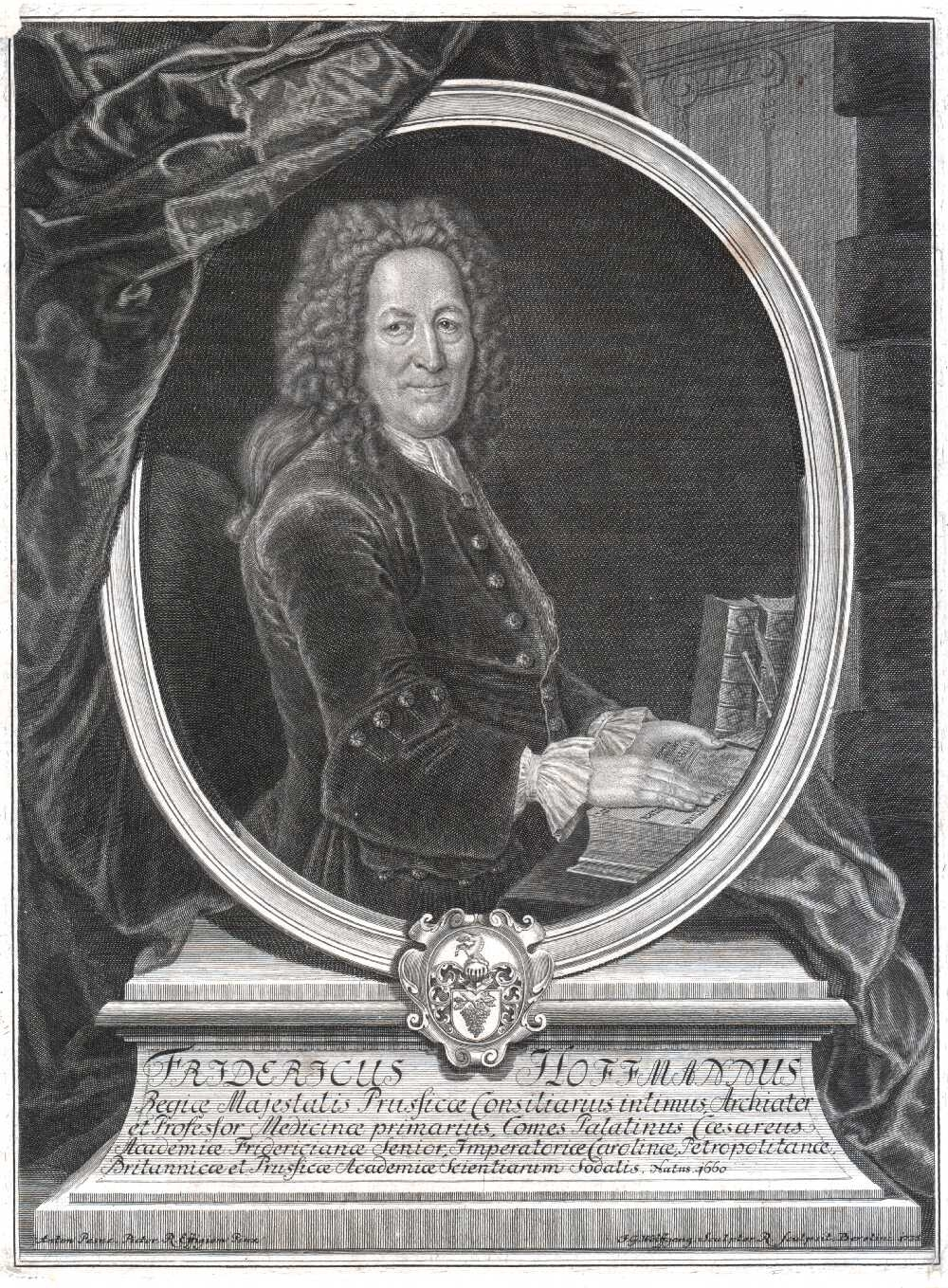
- Born: 19 February 1660; Halle
- Died: 12 November 1742 (aged 82); Halle
- Other names: Friedrich Hofmann, Frederick Hoffmann
- Education: University of Jena, University of Erfurt
- Known for: Investigation of carbon monoxide poisoning
- Scientific career
- Fields: Medicine, chemistry
- Workplaces: Halberstadt (physician to the principality); University of Halle

Friedrich Hoffmann or Hofmann (19 February 1660 – 12 November 1742) was a German physician and chemist. He is also sometimes known in English as Frederick Hoffmann.

== Life ==
His family had been connected with medicine for 200 years before him. Born in Halle, he attended the local gymnasium where he acquired that taste for and skill in mathematics to which he attributed much of his later success. Beginning at age 18, he studied medicine at the University of Jena. From there, in 1680, he went to Erfurt, to attend Kasper Cramer's lectures on chemistry. Next year, returning to Jena, he received his doctor's diploma, and, after publishing a thesis, was permitted to teach. Constant study then began to tell on his health, and in 1682, leaving his already numerous pupils, he opened a practice in Minden at the request of a relative who held a high position in that town. After practising at Minden for two years, Hoffmann made a journey to Holland and England, where he formed the acquaintance of many illustrious chemists and physicians. Towards the end of 1684, he returned to Minden, and during the next three years he received many flattering appointments. In 1688 he moved to the more promising sphere of Halberstadt, with the title of physician to the principality of Halberstadt.

In 1693, shortly after the establishment of the University of Halle, he was appointed primary professor of medicine and natural philosophy. During his career there, he held the position of rector three times. With the exception of four years (1708–1712), which he passed at Berlin in the capacity of royal physician, Hoffmann spent the rest of his life at Halle in instruction, practice and study, interrupted now and again by visits to different courts of Germany, where his services procured him honours and rewards. His fame became European. He was enrolled a member of many learned societies in different foreign countries (including being elected Fellow of the Royal Society in 1720), while in his own he became privy councillor.

Hoffmann died on 12 November 1742 in Halle.

== Work ==
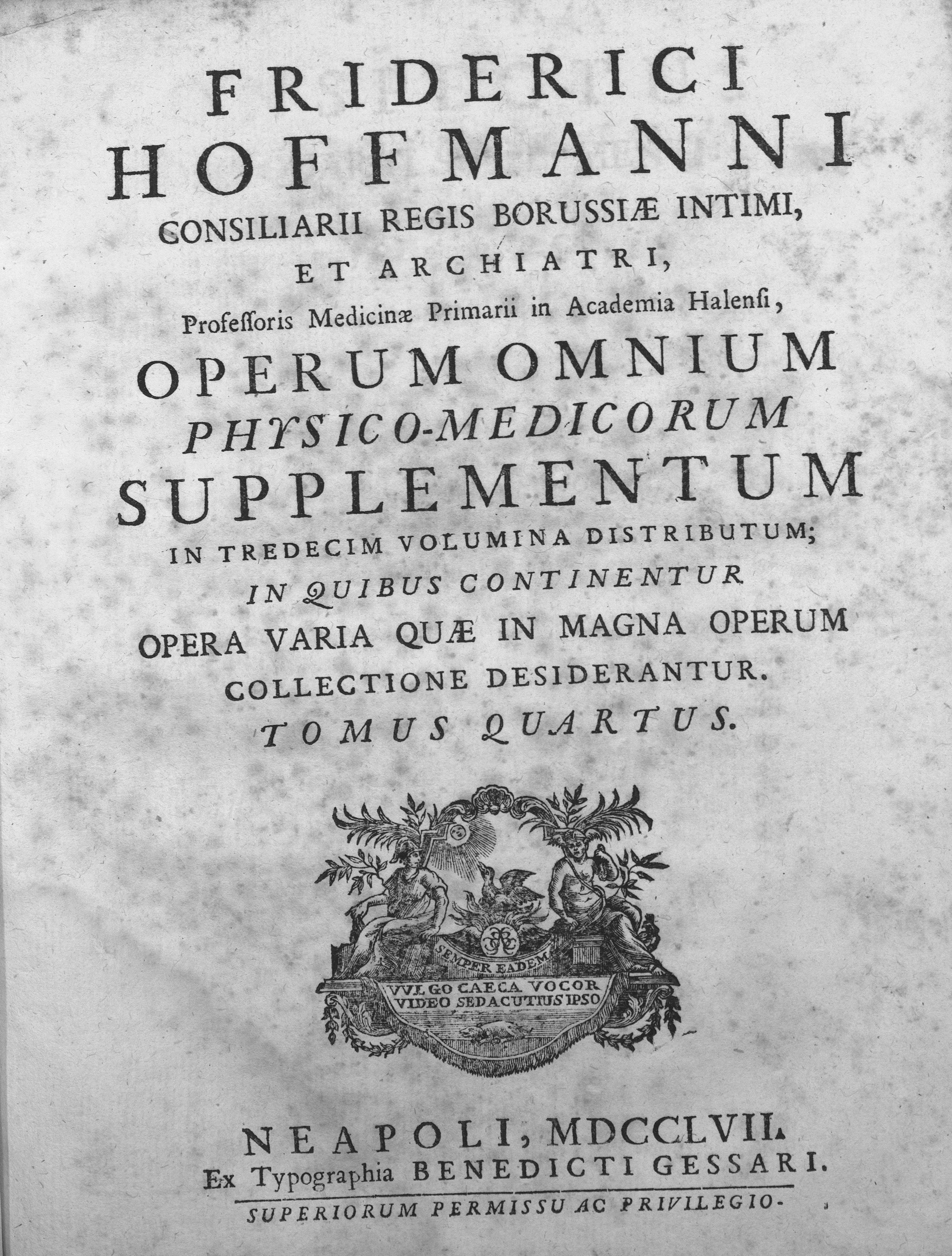
Operum omnium physico-medicorum

Of his numerous writings a catalogue is to be found in Haller's Bibliotheca medicinae practicae. The chief is Medicina rationalis systematica, undertaken at the age of sixty, and published in 1730. It was translated into French in 1739, under the title of Médecine raisonnée d'Hoffmann. A complete edition of Hoffmann's works, with a life of the author, was published at Geneva in 1740, to which supplements were added in 1753 and 1760. Editions appeared also at Venice in 1745 and at Naples in 1753 and 1793.

At the instigation of Robert Boyle, he turned to the analysis and uses of mineral waters and became a pioneer and chief promoter of their study, gave prescriptions for their use, taught how they could be imitated artificially, and analyzed many German springs. He concluded that solid constituents, such as lime, magnesia, etc., in the form of an alkali and carbonic acid, existed in almost all mineral springs. He wrote on healing springs as early as 1684. Georg Ernst Stahl opposed the general employment of mineral waters recommended by Hoffmann, though he did not question their utility in certain cases.

Hoffman is credited with conducting the first scientific investigation into carbon monoxide poisoning caused by burning charcoal. He rejected superstition that had attributed the death of several treasure seekers to paranormal activity and published "Considerations on the Fatal Effects of the Vapor from Burning Charcoal" in 1716 which characterized inhalation of polluted air from charcoal vapor causing suffocation similar to strangulation or drowning.

=== Works ===
- Friderici Hoffmanni Clavis pharmaceutica Schröderiana, seu Animadversiones cum Annotationibus in Pharmacopoeiam Schröderianam : Baconianis, Cartesianis, & Helmontianis Principiis illustratae & Johannis Michaelis p.m. & aliorum celeberrimorum Medicorum Arcanis concinnatae . Mylius, Halae Saxonum 1675 Digital edition by the University and State Library Düsseldorf
- Friderici Hoffmanni Thesaurus pharmaceuticus Medicorum nostri Seculi principum . Mylius, Halae Saxonum 1675 Digital edition by the University and State Library Düsseldorf
- D. Johann Schröders vollständige und nutz-reiche Apotheke/ Oder: Trefflich versehener Medicin-Chymischer höchstkostbarer Artzney-Schatz : Nebst D. Friedrich Hoffmanns darüber verfasseten herrlichen Anmerckungen; in fünff Bücher eingetheilt ... . Hoffmann & Streck, Franckfurt [u.a.] Nun aber bey dieser Zweyten Edition Um ein merckliches vermehret und verbessert 1709 Digital edition by the University and State Library Düsseldorf
- Johann Schröders vollständige und nutzreiche Apotheke oder trefflich versehener medicin-chymischer höchst-kostbarer Artzney-Schatz : nebst Friedrich Hoffmanns darüber verfasseten herrlichen Anmerckungen; in fünff Bücher eingetheilt . Hoffmann, Franckfurt Nun aber bey dieser dritten Edition um ein merckliches vermehret, verbessert 1718 Digital edition by the University and State Library Düsseldorf
- Friderici Hoffmanni Observationum physico-chemicarum selectiorum libri III . Renger, Halae 1722 Digital edition by the University and State Library Düsseldorf
- De Potentia Diaboli in Corpore, a witchcraft book for his student Gottfried Büching.

== Bibliography ==
- Reynolds, Francis J., ed. (1921). "Hoffman" . Collier's New Encyclopedia. New York: P. F. Collier & Son Company.
- de Ceglia, F. P. (2026). The Conspiracy of Silence: Friedrich Hoffmann and the Governance of Medical Dissent in Early-Eighteenth-Century Prussia. Early Science and Medicine, 31(2), 162-205. https://doi.org/10.1163/15733823-20251377
