= Johann Heinrich Schulze =

German professor and polymath credited as one of the fathers of photography

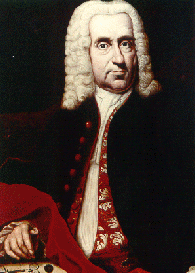
- Johann Heinrich Schulze
- Born: 12 May 1687; Colbitz, Duchy of Magdeburg
- Died: 10 October 1744 (aged 57)
- Education: Altdorf
- Known for: Experiments with silver nitrate
- Scientific career
- Workplaces: Altdorf; Halle

Johann Heinrich Schulze (12 May 1687 – 10 October 1744) was a German professor and polymath.

== History ==
Schulze studied medicine, chemistry, philosophy and theology and became a professor in Altdorf and Halle for anatomy and several other subjects.

== Notable discoveries ==
Schulze is best known for his discovery that the darkening in sunlight of various substances mixed with silver nitrate is due to the light, not the heat as other experimenters believed, and for using the phenomenon to temporarily capture shadows.

Schulze's experiments with silver nitrate were undertaken in about 1717. He found that a slurry of chalk and nitric acid into which some silver had been dissolved was darkened by sunlight, but not by exposure to the heat from a fire. To provide an interesting demonstration of its darkening by light, he applied stencils of words to a bottle filled with the mixture and put it in direct sunlight, which produced copies of the text in dark characters on the surface of the contents. The impressions persisted until they were erased by shaking the bottle or until overall exposure to light obliterated them. Because they were produced by the action of light, an extremely broad and literal definition of what a photograph is may allow even these fluid, ephemeral sun printings to qualify as such, and on that basis many German sources and some international ones credit Schulze as the inventor of photography.

Though Schulze's work did not provide a means of permanently preserving an image, it did provide a foundation for later efforts toward that end. Thomas Wedgwood and Humphry Davy produced more substantial but still impermanent shadow images on coated paper and leather around the year 1800. Nicéphore Niépce succeeded in photographing camera images on paper coated with silver chloride in 1816 but he, too, could not make his results light-fast. The first permanent camera photograph of this type was made in 1835 by Henry Fox Talbot.

== Works ==
- Abhandlung von der Stein-Chur durch innerliche Artzeneyen überhaupt und insonderheit von der neulich bekannt gewordenen Englischen . Franckfurt, 1740 Digital edition by the University and State Library Düsseldorf
- Chemische Versuche . Waysenhaus, Halle 1745 Digital edition by the University and State Library Düsseldorf
