= Johann Christian Gottlieb Ackermann =

German doctor (1756–1801)

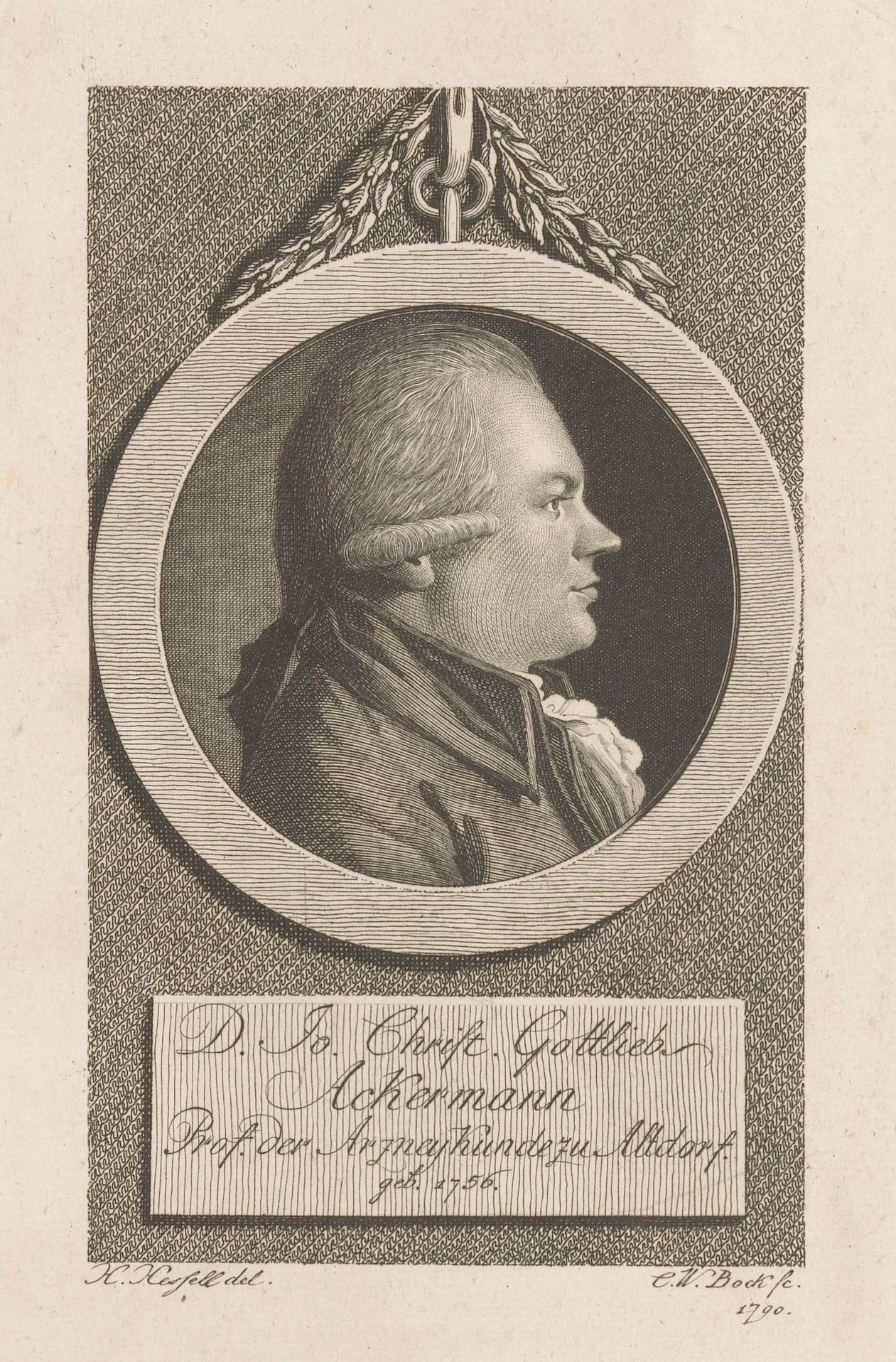
- Born: 17 February 1756; Zeulenroda
- Died: 9 March 1801 (aged 45); Altdorf bei Nürnberg
- Education: University of Jena
- Scientific career
- Fields: medicine chemistry
- Workplaces: Halle; Zeulenroda; Altdorf
- Doctoral advisor: Ernst Gottfried Baldinger
- Other academic advisors: Christian Gottlob Heyne

Johann Christian Gottlieb Ackermann (17 February 1756 – 9 March 1801) was a German medical doctor.

== Biography ==
He was born at Zeulenroda, in Upper Saxony, on 17 February 1756. His parents were the physician Johann Samuel Ackermann (1705-1762) and Eva Rosine Oberreuther (1722-1776), the daughter of the tanning master Paul Steinmüller.

Johann attended the University of Jena at only fifteen years old and was taught there by Ernst Gottfried Baldinger. The two relocated to Göttingen where he studied, apart from medicine, the classical sciences, as a student of Christian Gottlob Heyne. Ackermann was promoted in 1775 to private lecturer at the medical faculty of Halle, where he lived for two years. Afterwards, he returned to Zeulenroda to practice medicine and physics. In 1786, he followed a call to Altdorf, where he was appointed professor of chemistry. In 1794, he accepted a position as chair of applied medicine and - at the same time - a position as head of the local hospital for the poor. He died at the age of 45 from tuberculosis.

The main focus of Ackermann's scientific works lies in his historical studies of the medical sciences during the Middle Ages. He collected several rare medical writings and translated foreign publications into German. He wrote Institutiones Historiae Medicinae (Nuremberg, 1792) and Institutiones Therapiae Generalis (Nuremberg and Altdorf, 1784-1795).

== Publications ==
- Regimen sanitatis Salerni, Stendal, 1790
- Institutiones historicae medicinae, Nuremberg, 1792
- Bemerkungen über die Kenntnis und Kur einiger Krankheiten, 7 booklets in old German language, 1794-1800

== Sources ==
- Allgemeine Deutsche Biographie - online version
