= Jürgen Raab =

German footballer (born 1958)

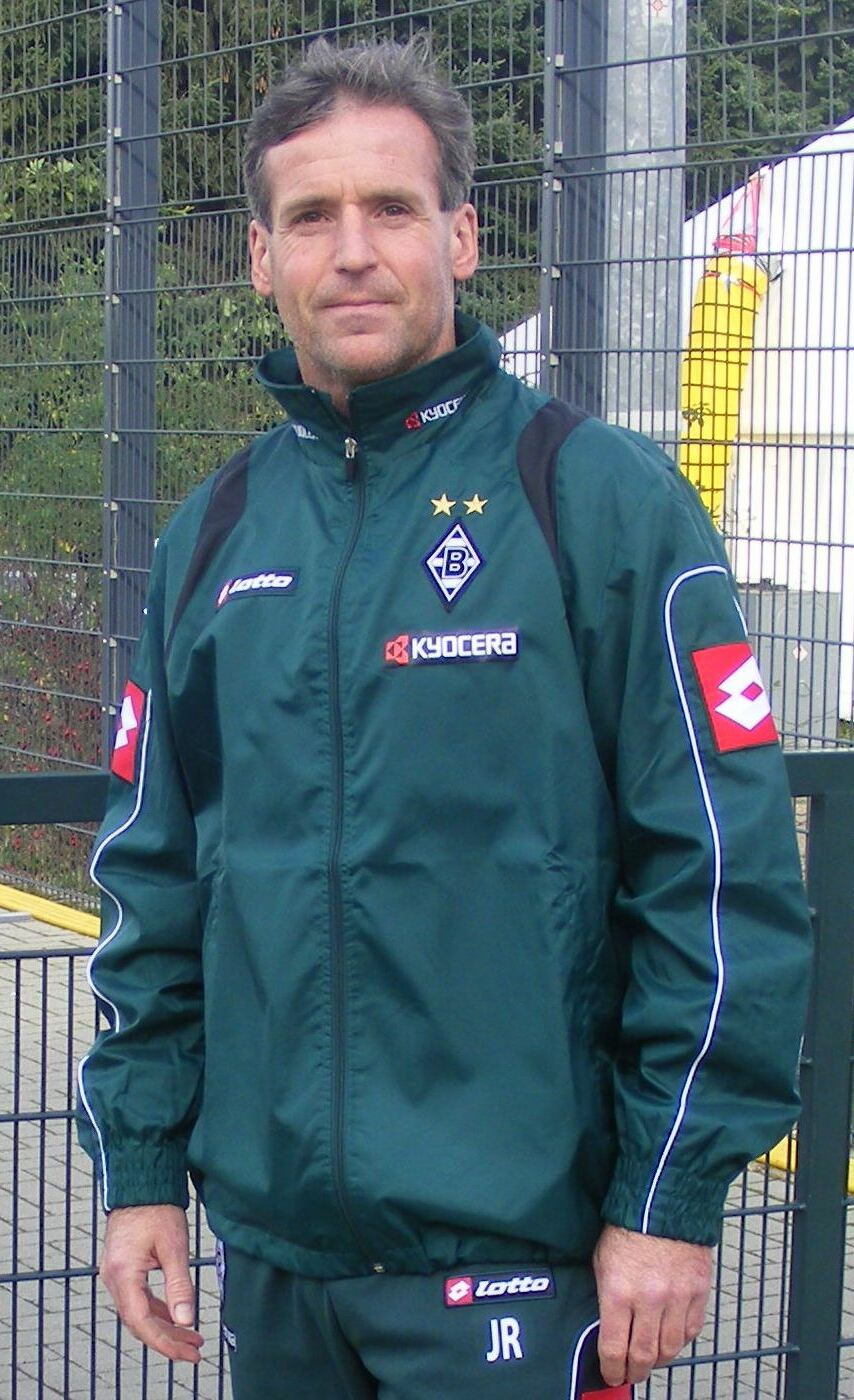
- Raab with Borussia Mönchengladbach in 2008

Personal information
- Date of birth: 20 December 1958 (age 67)
- Place of birth: Zeulenroda, Bezirk Gera, East Germany
- Height: 1.82 m (6 ft 0 in)
- Position: Midfielder

Youth career
- 1965–1975: BSG Einheit Triebes
- 1975–1976: Carl Zeiss Jena

Senior career*
Years	Team	Apps	(Gls)
1976–1993	Carl Zeiss Jena	376	(120)

International career
1982–1988	East Germany	20	(2)

Managerial career
- 1995–1997: VfB Pößneck
- 1997–2000: Rot-Weiß Erfurt
- 2000–2001: Bursaspor (assistant)
- 2001–2003: Sachsen Leipzig
- 2004: Sachsen Leipzig
- 2005–2008: 1. FC Nürnberg (assistant)
- 2008–2010: Borussia Mönchengladbach (assistant)
- 2010: Carl Zeiss Jena
- 2011: Einheit Rudolstadt
- 2011–2013: SSV Markranstädt
- 2014–2015: Singapore U23 (fitness coach)
- 2015–2016: Young Lions
- 2017–2018: Tampines Rovers
- 2022–2025: VfB Pößneck
- * Club domestic league appearances and goals

Jürgen Raab (born 20 December 1958) is a German football coach and former player. A midfielder, he spent his entire club career with DDR-Oberliga club Carl Zeiss Jena. At international level, he made 20 appearances or the East Germany scoring twice.

== Club career ==
Raab was born in Zeulenroda, Bezirk Gera. In the DDR-Oberliga he played for Carl Zeiss Jena 376 games and scored 120 goals.

== International career ==
Raab played 20 times for the East Germany national team and scored two goals.

== Coaching career ==
Raab was later a manager for Rot-Weiß Erfurt, Sachsen Leipzig and assistant coach by Bursaspor and 1. FC Nürnberg. On 1 June 2010, he replaced René van Eck at his former club Carl Zeiss Jena as head coach.

In October 2014, he signed for the Singapore national team on a one-year contract. His role was to work with head coach, Bernd Stange particularly in the area of fitness. After former Courts Young Lions head coach, Aide Iskandar's resignation, he was named the head coach for the Courts Young Lions in the Singapore League for the rest of the 2015 season.

In January 2017, less than a week after announcing the parting of ways with Akbar Nawas, Tampines Rovers have confirmed Raab as their head coach starting from the 2017 S.League season, signing a three-year contract to take charge of the five-time S.League champions.

Jurgen was relieved of his duties at Tampines Rovers on 9 October 2018. In his two-year stint with Tampines Rovers, he brought them to finish as the league's second place in 2017 and fourth place in 2018.
