= Zeulenroda-Triebes =

- Town
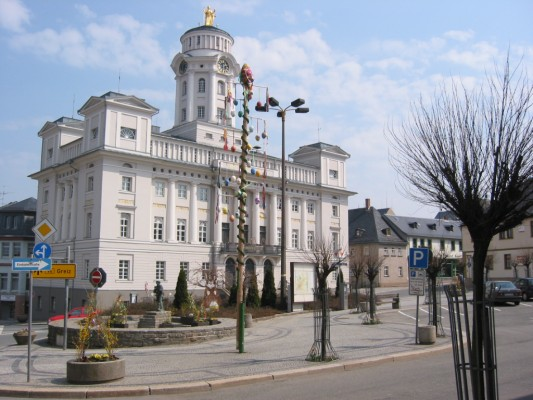
- Town hall

- Coat of arms

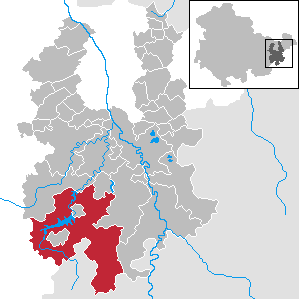
- Location of Zeulenroda-Triebes within Greiz district
- Interactive map of Zeulenroda-Triebes
- Location within Germany Location within Thuringia
- Coordinates: 50°38′55″N 11°58′50″E
- Country: Germany
- State: Thuringia
- District: Greiz

Government
  - Mayor (2024–30): Heike Bergmann

Area
  - Total: 135.15 km^{2} (52.18 sq mi)
- Elevation: 415 m (1,362 ft)

Population (2025-12-31)
  - Total: 15,677
  - Density: 116.00/km^{2} (300.43/sq mi)
- Time zone: UTC+01:00 (CET)
  - Summer (DST): UTC+02:00 (CEST)
- Postal codes: 07931–07937, 07950
- Dialling codes: 036628, 036622
- Vehicle registration: GRZ, ZR
- Website: www.zeulenroda-triebes.de

Zeulenroda-Triebes (German pronunciation: [ˌtsɔʏlənˈʁoːda ˈtʁiːbəs]) is a German town in the district of Greiz in the state of Thuringia.

Zeulenroda-Triebes is situated in the south of Greiz in the mountains of the Thuringian Slate Mountains (Thüringer Schiefergebirge), on the border with Saxony. The population of Zeulenroda-Triebes in 2006 was about 18,000. The largest company is Bauerfeind AG. The most famous sight in the town is the neoclassical town hall, built in 1827. Zeulenroda-Triebes is also known for the International Thuringia Women's Cycling Tour.

Zeulenroda unt Bf station lies on the Werdau–Mehltheuer railway.

== History ==
Zeulenroda was mentioned in a document for a Saalburg convent as early as 1325, in Medieval Latin as Zulenrode. The village became a town in 1438. Zeulenroda belonged to the principality of the House of Reuss Elder Line for several centuries. On April 16, 1945 the United States Army took over Zeulenroda without a battle. On July 1 the Red Army occupied the town. In 1949 Zeulenroda and Triebes became a part of the German Democratic Republic. After German reunification in 1990, the Free State of Thuringia was reestablished. Zeulenroda merged with Triebes in 2006. The new name of the town is Zeulenroda-Triebes.

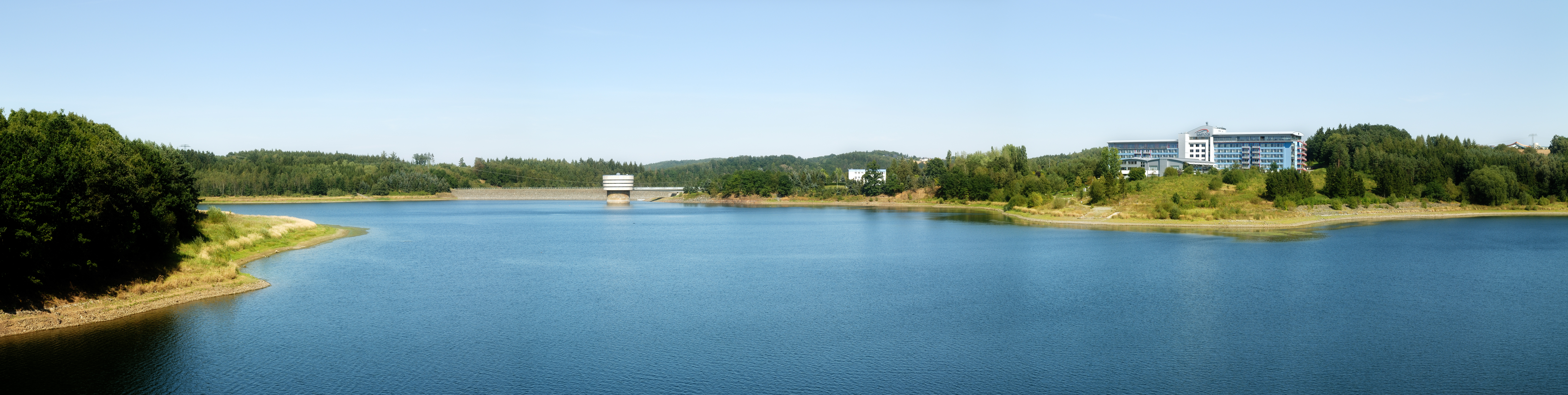
Zeulenroda barrage

== Population development ==
In 1908 the population of Zeulenroda reached the 10,000 mark. In 1946, the town had grown to more than 14,000 inhabitants through many resettlers. At the beginning of the 1990s more than 15,000 people lived in Zeulenroda. In recent years the number of inhabitants has declined slightly.

Population development to 2017

=== 1830–2005 (Zeulenroda only) ===
- 1830: 8,449
- 1905: 9,776
- 1910: 10,389
- 1925: 11,047
- 1933: 12,247
- 1939: 12,688
- 1946: 14,039
- 1950: 13,694
- 1960: 13,684
- 1981: 14,709
- 1995: 15,021
- 2000: 14,600
- 2005: 13,434

=== 2005–2019 (Zeulenroda-Triebes) ===
- 2005: 17,4741
- 2006: 17,211
- 2007: 16,924
- 2008: 16,606
- 2009: 16,344
- 2010: 16,139
- 2011: 16,445
- 2012: 17,347
- 2013: 17,098
- 2014: 16,948
- 2015: 16,901
- 2016: 16,115
- 2017: 16,594
- 2018: 16,487
- 2019: 16,350

Data source: Thürigian State Statistics Center

1 before the merger of the two towns

== Local council ==
The elections in May 2014 showed the following results:

- CDU 11 seats
- The Left 5 seats
- SPD 3 seats
- BIZ 2 seats
- TV 2 seats
- FDP 1 seat

BIZ means Bürgerinitiative für sozialverträgliche Abgaben und Leistungsgerechtigkeit in Zeulenroda und Umgebung e. V.
TV means: Wählergemeinschaft Thüringer Vogtland

== Twin towns – sister cities ==
Zeulenroda-Triebes is twinned with:

- Giengen, Germany
- Kostelec nad Orlicí, Czech Republic
- Neunkirchen am Sand, Germany
- Nýřany, Czech Republic
- Sainte-Florine, France
- Wies, Austria

== Notable people ==
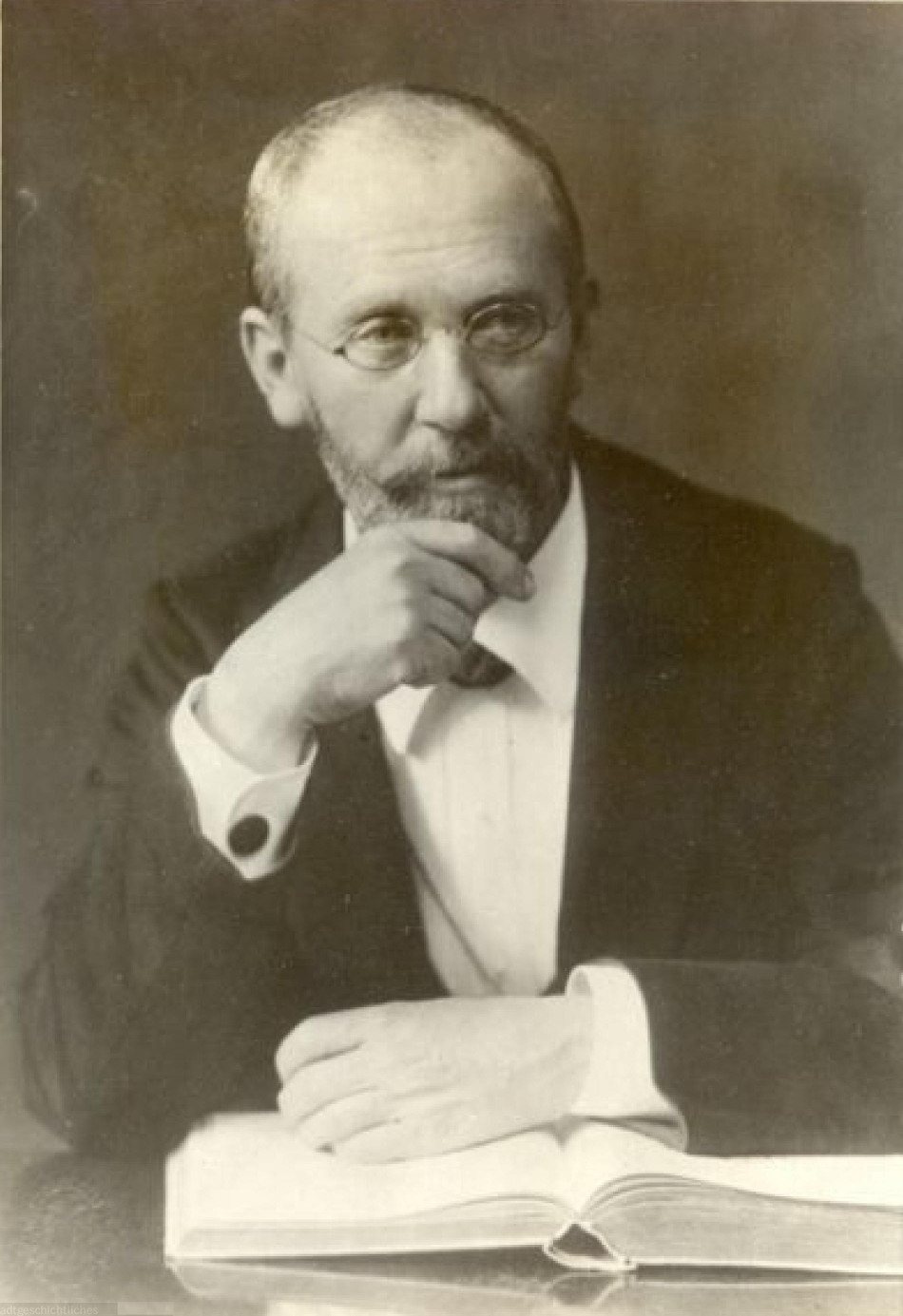
Gustav Schreck around 1900

Paul Herman Geithner (1902–1972), was born in Zeulenroda and immigrated with his parents to Philadelphia, Pennsylvania in 1908. His grandson, Timothy Geithner, was the 75th United States Secretary of the Treasury, serving under President Barack Obama.

- Johann Christian Gottlieb Ackermann (1756–1801), physician
- Gustav Schreck (1849–1918), Thomaskantor in Leipzig
- Heinrich Seeling (1852–1932), architect
- Fritz Wächtler (1891–1945), Nazi Party politician
- Gerd Schenker (born 1948), percussionist
- Jürgen Raab (born 1958), football player and coach
- Thomas Barth (born 1960), cyclist
- Henning Bürger (born 1969), football player and coach
- Doreen Dietel (born 1974), actress
- Alexander John (born 1986), hurdler
- René Enders (born 1987), track cyclist
