= Johann Adolph Wedel =

German professor of medicine (1675–1747)

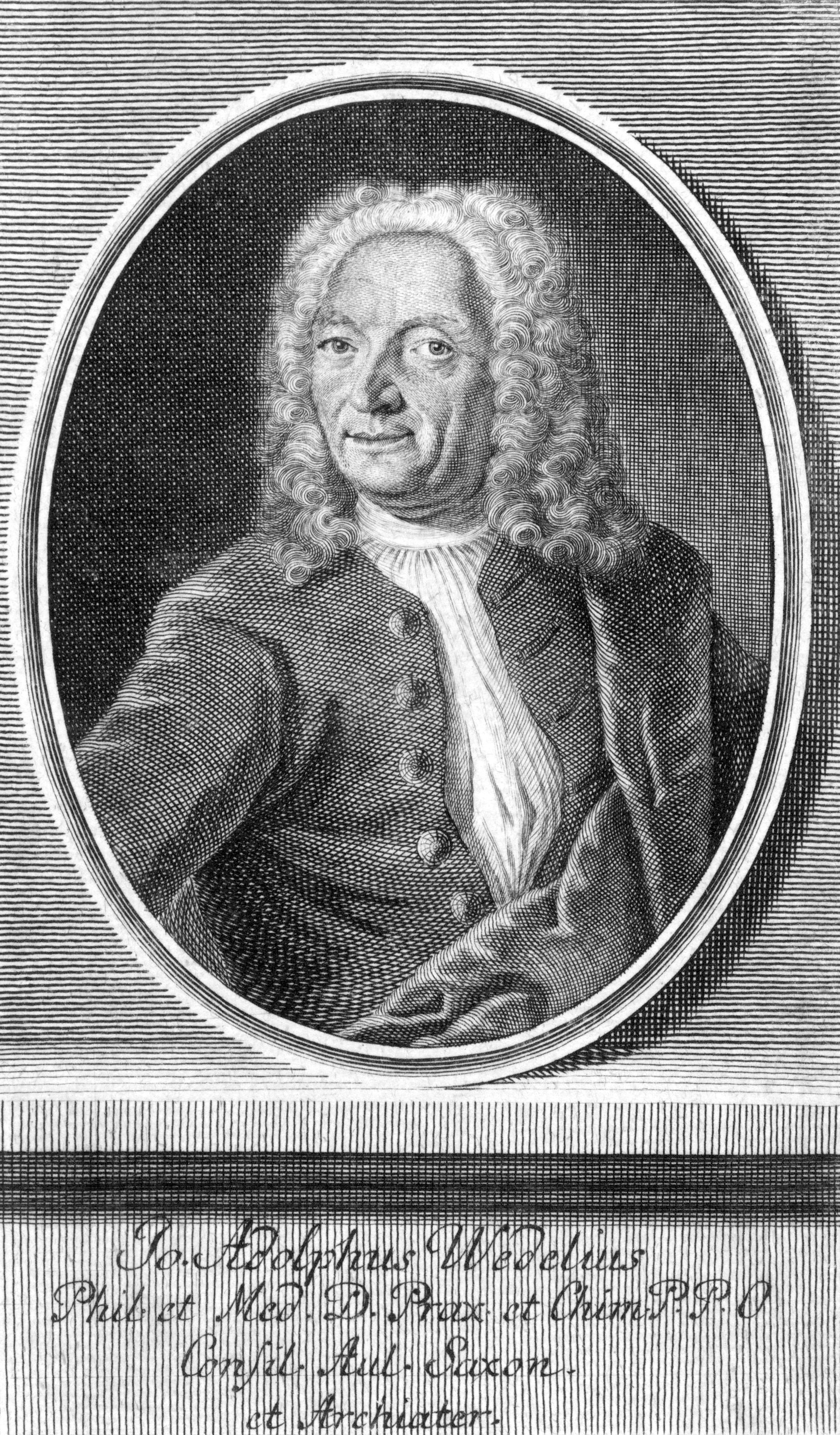
- Born: 1675
- Died: 1747 (aged 71–72)
- Education: University of Jena
- Known for: Study of fermentation
- Scientific career
- Fields: Medicine, chemistry
- Workplaces: University of Jena
- Doctoral advisor: Georg Wolfgang Wedel
- Doctoral students: Georg Erhard Hamberger

Johann Adolph Wedel (1675–1747) was a German professor of medicine.

Wedel was the son of Georg Wolfgang Wedel, also a physician. He received his Doctor of Medicine degree from the University of Jena (then in Saxe-Eisenach) in 1697. He published research works on camphor, fermentation, magnesium carbonate, the combustion of sulfur, and various medical issues.
