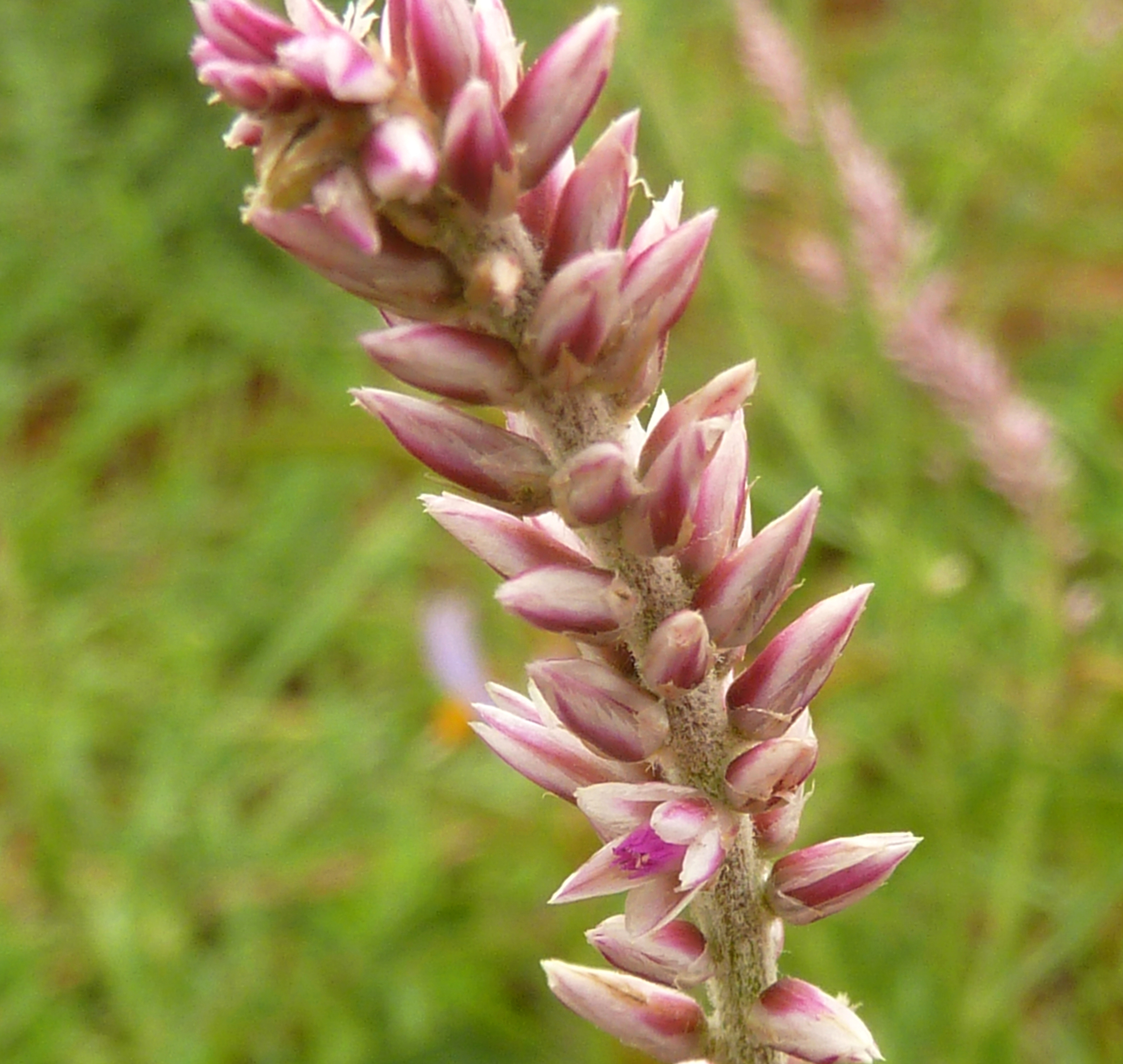
- Hermbstaedtia odorata

Scientific classification
- Kingdom: Plantae
- Clade: Tracheophytes
- Clade: Angiosperms
- Clade: Eudicots
- Order: Caryophyllales
- Family: Amaranthaceae
- Genus: Hermbstaedtia; Rchb.

Synonyms
- Berzelia Mart.; Hyparete Raf.; Langia Endl.; Pelianthus E.Mey. ex Moq.

= Hermbstaedtia =

Genus of plants

Hermbstaedtia is a genus of flowering plants belonging to the family Amaranthaceae.

Its native range is Kenya, southern tropical and southern Africa. It is found in the countries of Angola, Botswana, Kenya, Mozambique, Namibia, Eswatini, Zambia, Zimbabwe and in South Africa (within the regions of Cape Provinces, Free State, KwaZulu-Natal, Northern Provinces).

The genus name of Hermbstaedtia is in honour of Sigismund Friedrich Hermbstädt (1760–1833), a German pharmacist and chemist. It was first described and published in Consp. Regn. Veg. on page 164 in 1828.

== Known species ==
According to Kew:

- Hermbstaedtia afra (Meisn.) Moq.
- Hermbstaedtia angolensis C.B.Clarke
- Hermbstaedtia argenteiformis Schinz
- Hermbstaedtia capitata Schinz
- Hermbstaedtia exellii (Suess.) C.C.Towns.
- Hermbstaedtia fleckii (Schinz) Baker & C.B.Clarke
- Hermbstaedtia glauca (J.C.Wendl.) Rchb. ex Steud.
- Hermbstaedtia gregoryi C.B.Clarke
- Hermbstaedtia linearis Schinz
- Hermbstaedtia nigrescens Suess.
- Hermbstaedtia odorata (Burch.) T.Cooke
- Hermbstaedtia scabra Schinz
- Hermbstaedtia schaeferi (Schinz) Schinz & Dinter
- Hermbstaedtia spathulifolia (Engl.) Baker
