= Georg Erhard Hamberger =

German professor of medicine, surgery, and botany (1697–1755)

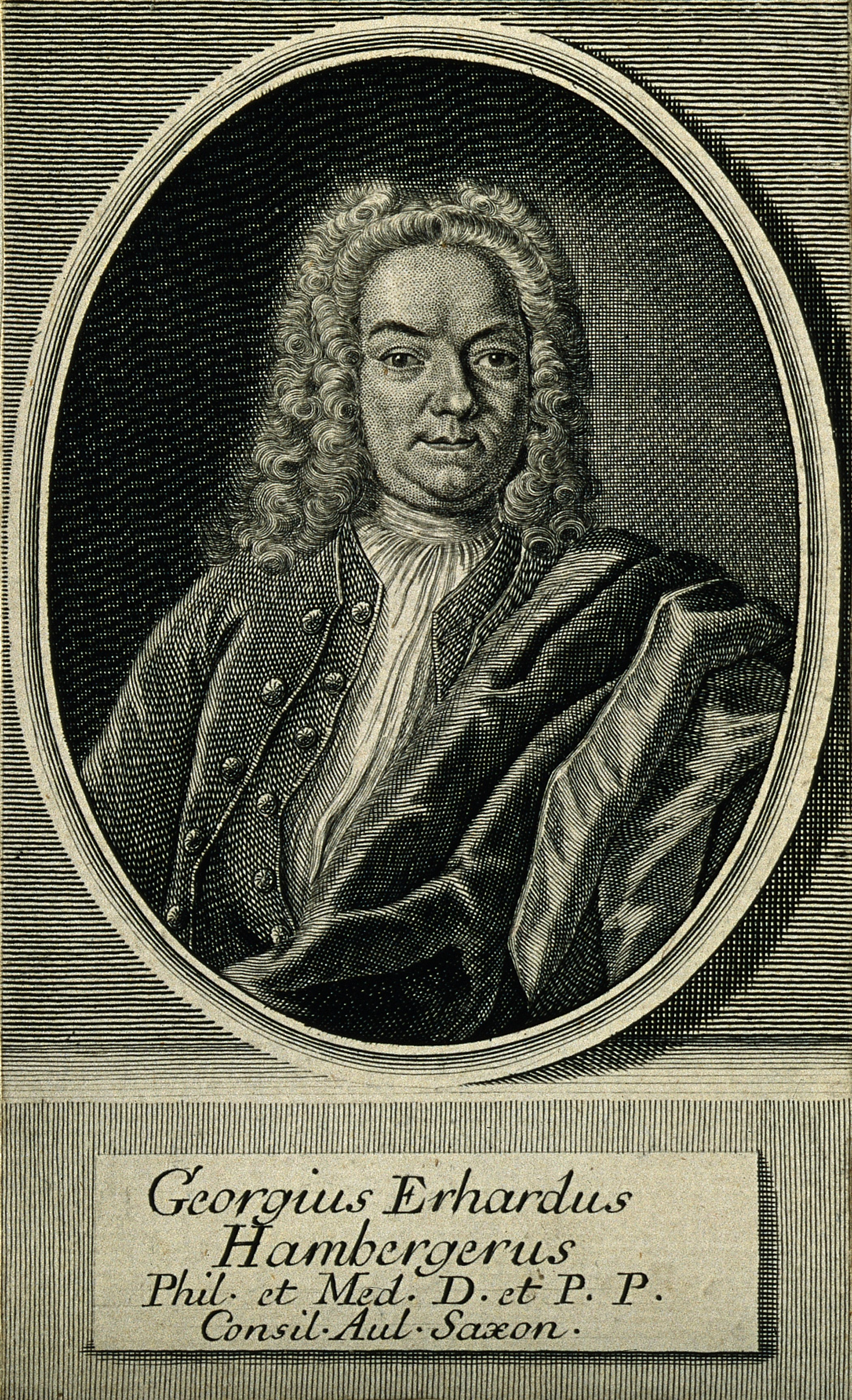
- Georg Erhard Hamberger
- Born: 21 December 1697; Jena, Saxe-Weimar
- Died: 22 July 1755 (aged 57)
- Education: University of Jena
- Known for: Physiology of respiration
- Scientific career
- Fields: Medicine, physiology, botany
- Workplaces: University of Jena
- Doctoral advisor: Johann Adolph Wedel
- Doctoral students: Christoph Andreas Mangold

Georg Erhard Hamberger (21 December 1697 – 22 July 1755) was a German professor of medicine, surgery, and botany.

== Biography ==
Hamberger was born in Jena, and received his Doctor of Medicine degree from the University of Jena in 1721. He studied the physiology of respiration, especially with respect to breathing. He authored a textbook on physiology, covering the thorax muscles, intercostal muscles, and pleural sac. He also studied the reaction of camphor and nitric acid. His writings included the study of gravitation and the ascension of gases.
