= Christian Gottlob Heyne =

German classical philologist (1729–1812)

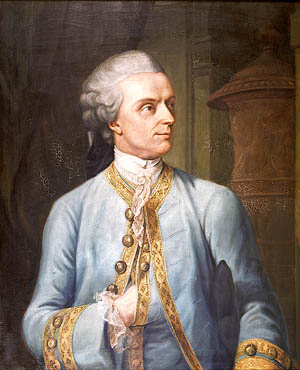
- Portrait by Johann Heinrich Wilhelm Tischbein (1772)
- Born: 25 September 1729; Chemnitz, Electorate of Saxony
- Died: 14 July 1812 (aged 82); Göttingen, Kingdom of Westphalia
- Occupations: Classical philologist, archaeologist, librarian

Academic background
- Education: Leipzig University
- Academic advisor: Johann August Ernesti

Academic work
- Institutions: University of Göttingen; Göttingen State and University Library
- Notable students: Friedrich Bouterwek; Wilhelm von Humboldt; August Schlegel; Friedrich Schlegel; Johann Heinrich Voss

Christian Gottlob Heyne (German: [ˈhaɪnə]; 25 September 1729 – 14 July 1812) was a German classical scholar and archaeologist as well as long-time director of the Göttingen State and University Library. He was a member of the Göttingen school of history.

== Biography ==
Heyne was born in Chemnitz, Saxony. His father was a poor weaver who had left Silesia and moved to Saxony to maintain his Protestant faith; Christian's education was paid for by his godfather. In 1748 he entered the University of Leipzig, where he was often short of the necessaries of life. He was helped by the classicist Johann Friedrich Christ, who encouraged him and loaned him Greek and Latin texts. He obtained a position as tutor in the family of a French merchant in Leipzig, which enabled him to continue his studies. In 1752 law professor Johann August Bach awarded Heyne a master's degree, but he was for many years in very straitened circumstances.

An elegy written by Heyne in Latin on the death of a friend attracted the attention of Count von Brühl, the prime minister, who expressed a desire to see the author. Accordingly, in April 1752, Heyne journeyed to Dresden, believing that his fortune was made. He was well received and promised a secretaryship and a good salary, but nothing came of it. Another period of poverty followed, and only by persistent solicitation was Heyne able to obtain the post of under-clerk in the count's library, with a salary of less than twenty pounds sterling.

Heyne increased this pittance by translation: in addition to some French novels, he rendered into German The Loves of Chaereas and Callirrhoe of Chariton, the Greek romance writer. He published his first edition of Tibullus in 1755, and in 1756 his Epictetus. In the latter year the Seven Years' War broke out and the library was destroyed, and Heyne was once more in a state of destitution. In 1757 he was offered a tutorship in the household of Frau von Schönberg, where he met his future wife.

In January 1758 Heyne accompanied his pupil to the University of Wittenberg, but the Prussian invasion drove him out in 1760. The bombardment of Dresden, on 18 July 1760, destroyed all his possessions, including an almost finished edition of Lucian, based on a valuable codex of the Dresden Library. In the summer of 1761, still without any fixed income, he married, and became land-steward to the Baron von Löben in Lusatia. At the end of 1762, however, he was able to return to Dresden, where he was commissioned by P. D. Lippert to prepare the Latin text of the third volume of his Dactyliotheca (art account of a collection of gems).

On the death of Johann Matthias Gesner at the University of Göttingen in 1761, the vacant chair was refused first by Ernesti and then by Ruhnken, who persuaded Münchhausen, the Hanoverian minister and principal curator of the university to bestow it on Heyne (1763). His emoluments were gradually augmented, and his growing celebrity brought him most advantageous offers from other German governments, which he persistently refused. Heyne was simultaneously given the post of director of the university library, a position he held until his death in 1812. Under his directorship, the library, today known as the Göttingen State and University Library, grew in size and reputation to be one of the leading academic libraries of the world, due to Heyne's innovative cataloguing methods and aggressive international acquisitions policy.

Unlike Gottfried Hermann, Heyne regarded the study of grammar and language only as the means to an end, not as the chief object of philology. But, although not a critical scholar, he was the first to attempt a scientific treatment of Greek mythology, and he gave an undoubted impulse to philological studies. He taught both Wilhelm and Alexander Humboldt in classical philology and managed to harness both brothers' interest in linguistic questions.

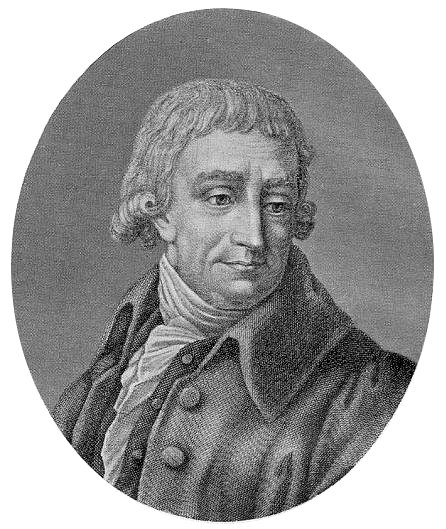
Christian Gottlob Heyne

Of Heyne's numerous writings, the following may be mentioned: editions, with copious commentaries, of Tibullus (ed. SC Wunderlich, 1817), Virgil (ed. GP Wagner, 1830–1841), Pindar (3rd ed. by GH Schafer, 1817), Apollodorus, Bibliotheca Graeca (1803), Homer, Iliad (1802); and Opuscula academica (1785–1812), containing more than a hundred academic dissertations, of which the most valuable are those relating to the colonies of Greece and the antiquities of Etruscan art and history. His Antiquarische Aufsätze (1778–1779) is a valuable collection of essays connected with the history of ancient art. His contributions to the Göttingische gelehrte Anzeigen are said to have been between 7,000 and 8,000 in number.

For further details on Heyne's life, see the biography by Heeren (1813) which forms the basis of the essay by Thomas Carlyle (Misc. Essays, ii.); Hermann Sauppe, Göttinger Professoren (1872); Conrad Bursian in Allgemeine Deutsche Biographie xii.; JE Sandys, Hist. Class. Schol iii. 36–44; and Friedrich Klingner, Christian Gottlob Heyne (Leipzig: Poeschel & Trepte, 1937, 25 pages).

Heyne was elected a Fellow of the Royal Society in April 1789.

He died in Göttingen.

== Personal life ==
In 1761, Heyne married his first wife Therese, the daughter of lutenist Silvius Leopold Weiss. They had three surviving children, including Therese Huber, who became one of the first well-known journalists in Germany as editor of the Morgenblatt für gebildete Stände. After the 1775 death of his first wife, Heyne married Georgine Brandes in 1777. The couple had six children.

== See also ==
- Johann Christian Gottlieb Ackermann
