= Sigismund Friedrich Hermbstädt =

German pharmacist and chemist (1760–1833)

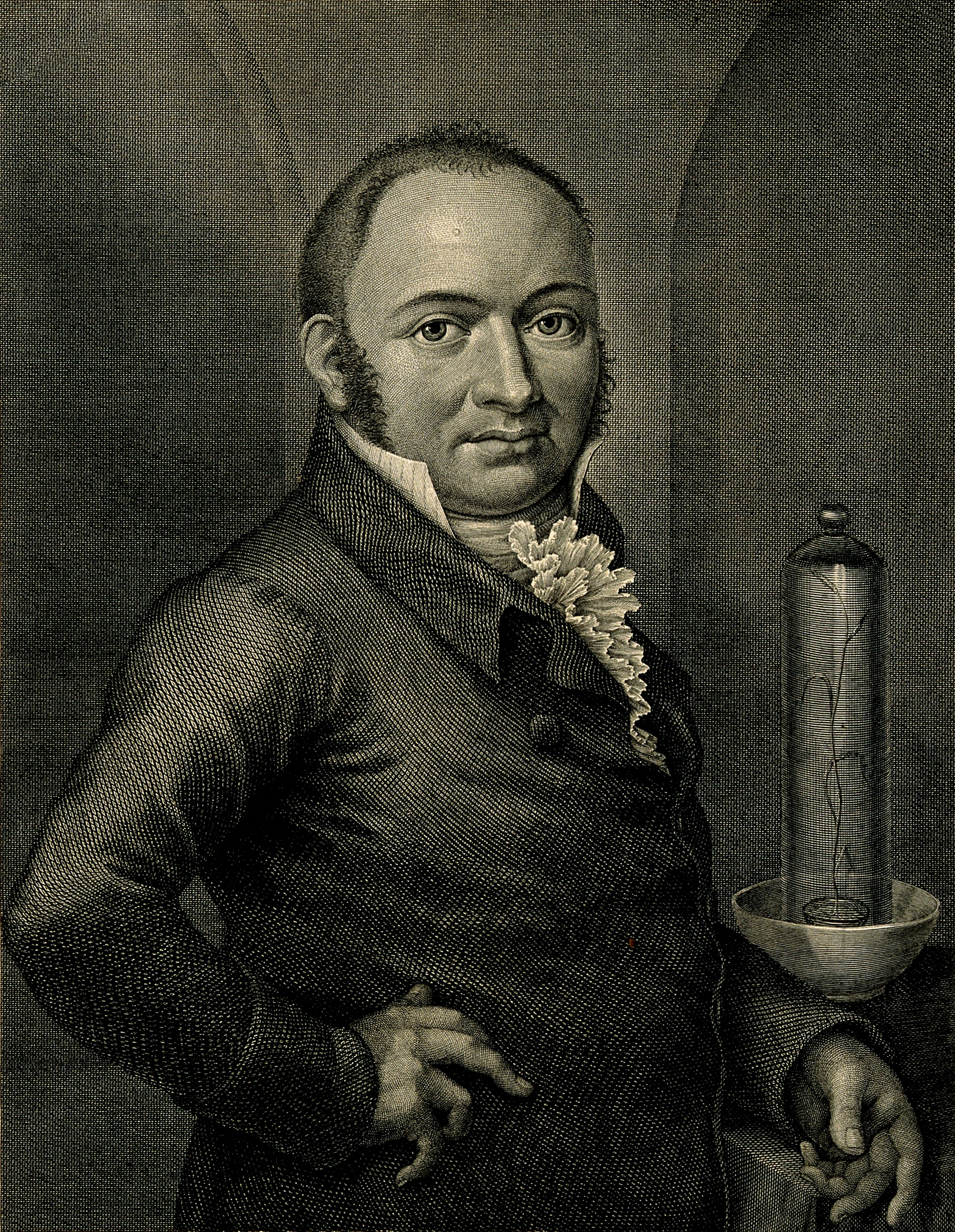
Sigismund Friedrich Hermbstädt

Sigismund Friedrich Hermbstädt (16 April 1760 – 22 October 1833) was a German pharmacist and chemist who wielded great influence on the improvement of science education for pharmacists. He also made numerous contributions in the fields of industrial and agricultural chemistry.

== Biography ==
Hermbstädt was born on 16 April 1760 in Erfurt. He studied medicine and pharmacy at the University of Erfurt, and following graduation, worked as an assistant in the pharmacy of Johann Christian Wiegleb in Langensalza. In 1786 he undertook a study trip to the Harz Mountains and the Ore Mountains, followed by visits to Göttingen, Halle, Leipzig and Freiberg, and in the process, made the acquaintance of several eminent scientists. In 1787 he moved to Berlin, where he conducted private lectures on chemistry, physics, technology and pharmacy. In 1781 he was appointed professor of chemistry and pharmacy at the Collegium Medico-chirurgicum in Berlin.

In 1808 he became a full member of the Prussian Academy of Sciences, and three years later was appointed professor of technological chemistry at the University of Berlin. In 1820 he became a professor of chemistry at the Allgemeinen Kriegsschule in Berlin.

In 1828 the botanical genus Hermbstaedtia (family Amaranthaceae) was named in his honor.

He died on 22 October 1833 in Berlin, at the age of 73.

== Written works ==
In 1804 he began edition of the Archiv der Agrikulturchemie für denkende Landwirthe (Archives of Agricultural Chemistry). He was also the author of numerous treatises on various subjects associated with agriculture and industry, such as: producing sugar from beets; the manufacture of soft and hard soap; the chemical principles of beer brewing; the cultivation of tobacco and the preparation and processing of flax and hemp. The following is a list of a few of his larger published works:

- Physikalisch-chemische Versuche und Beobachtungen, 1786 – Physical-chemical experiments and observations.
- System der antiphlogistischen Chemie, 1803, (translated from the French: Traité élémentaire de chimie by Antoine Laurent Lavoisier). – System of anti-phlogistin chemistry.
- Systematischer Grundriß der allgemeinen Experimentalchemie 1800–1805. – Systematic principles of general experimental chemistry.
- Grundsätze der experimentellen Kammeral-Chemie für Kammeralisten, Agronomen, Forstbediente und Technologen, 1808 – Principles of experimental cameral chemistry : for cameralists, agronomists, forestry workers and technologists.
- Grundriss der technologie, oder, Anleitung zur rationellen kenntniss und beurtheilung derjenigen kunste, fabriken, manufakturen und handwerke, welche mit der kameral- und policeywissenschaft, so wie der landwirthschaft in nachster verbindung stehen, 1814 – Principles of technology, etc.
