= Johann Friedrich August Göttling =

German chemist (1753–1809)

Johann Friedrich August Gottling
- Born: 5 June 1753; Derenburg, Prussia
- Died: 1 September 1809 (aged 56); Jena, Saxe-Weimar
- Scientific career
- Fields: Chemist
- Doctoral advisor: Johann Christian Wiegleb
- Doctoral students: Karl Wilhelm Gottlob Kastner

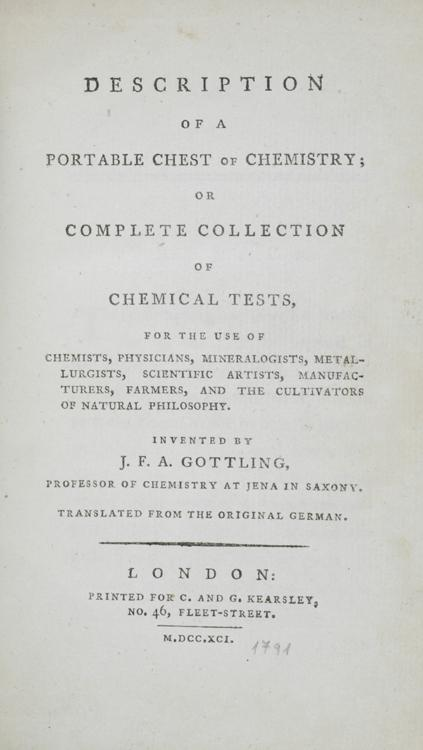
Description of a portable chest of chemistry, 1791

Johann Friedrich August Göttling (5 June 1753 – 1 September 1809) was a German chemist.

Gottling developed and sold chemical assay kits and studied processes for extracting sugar from beets to supplement his meagre university salary. He studied the chemistry of sulphur, arsenic, phosphorus, and mercury. He wrote texts on analytical chemistry and studied oxidation of organic compounds by nitric acid. He was one of the first scientists in Germany to take a stand against the phlogiston hypothesis and be in favor of the new chemistry of Lavoisier.

== Biography ==
He studied pharmacy at Langensalza under Johann Christian Wiegleb, and from 1775 worked at the Hofapotheke (court pharmacy) in Weimar. From 1785, Göttling studied natural sciences at the University of Göttingen. In 1789, Johann Wolfgang von Goethe arranged for him to be an associate professor of chemistry and technology at the University of Jena. For a period of time, Göttling served as Goethe's primary source for chemical knowledge.

He was notably the teacher of Karl Wilhelm Gottlob Kastner.

== Selected works ==
- Praktische Vortheile und Verbesserungen verschiedener pharmaceutisch-chemischer Operationen für Apotheker, 1783.
- Beytrag, zur Berichtigung der anti-phlogistischen Chemie auf Versuche gegründet, 1794.
- Chemische Bemerkungen über das phosphorsaure Quecksilber und Hrn. Hahnemanns schwarzen Quecksilberkalk, 1795.
- Handbuch der theoretischen und praktischen Chemie, 1798–1800 (3 volumes).
- Elementarbuch der chemischen Experimentirkunst, 1808–09 (2 volumes).

He was also an editor of the journal Taschenbuch für Scheidekünstler und Apotheker.
