= University and State Library Düsseldorf =

Academic library in Germany

Coordinates: 51°11′25″N 6°47′39″E

- Universitäts- und Landesbibliothek Düsseldorf
- Location: Düsseldorf, Germany
- Established: 1970

Collection
- Size: 2.4 million items (2011)

Other information
- Website: www.ulb.hhu.de/en.html

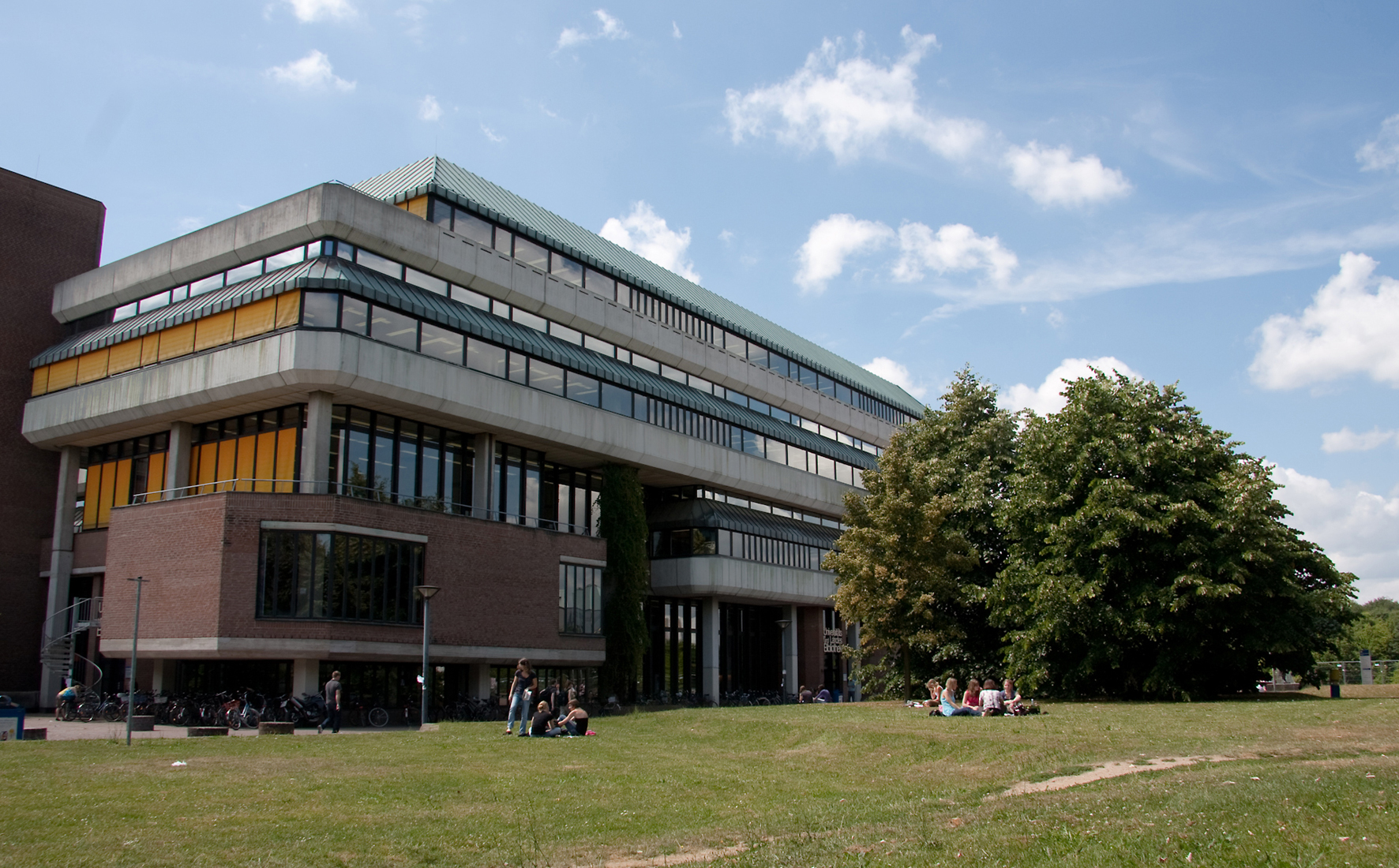
HHU ULB Wiese

The University and State Library Düsseldorf (German: Universitäts- und Landesbibliothek Düsseldorf, abbreviated ULB Düsseldorf) is a central service institution of Heinrich Heine University. Along with Bonn and Münster, it is also one of the three State Libraries of North Rhine-Westphalia.

== Tradition and Modernity ==
From 1965 to 1969, the University and Library Düsseldorf gradually developed out of the Medical Academy in Düsseldorf. There is no real founding year of the ULB, but the foundation stone for an integrated library system was laid when the former State and City Library of Düsseldorf was taken over by the university in 1970 and merged with the Central Library of the former Medical Academy.

== Structure and Holdings ==
The ULB consists of one central library and four decentralized locations. Management and media processing are organized centrally. Catalogues, databases, e-books and e-journals are accessible throughout the whole university as well as at home via the library network.

== Collections ==
=== Thomas Mann Collection ===
The ULB houses one of the largest collections of works by and about Thomas Mann. It was established by the Germanist and bookseller Hans-Otto Mayer and not only comprises editions of complete works, rare first publications, manuscripts and translations into more than 40 languages but also secondary literature including an extensive archive of excerpts. Special catalogues have been written for detailed research in these large holdings. The collection is extended constantly.

=== Manuscripts ===
The scripts that are kept in the ULB reach back to the 8th century. They largely come from holdings of Rhenish or Westphalian convents and preserve mainly liturgical and theological texts. Thus, one can find sources of inestimable value for numerous academic disciplines.

=== Incunabula ===
Nearly 1000 incunabula can be found in the holdings of the ULB. These valuable specimens, among them unica and fragments of seldom preserved "consume literature", show the beginnings of the art of printing. They originate predominantly from workshops of Rhenish or Dutch printers and offer a rich panorama of the regional book production at the beginning of the modern era.

=== Special Collections ===
In other collections, the ULB unites rare, valuable and unique parts of holdings that are installed as an ensemble. Deposita, unpublished works, donations, acquisition of rare books etc. were and are an important source for the constant growth of the library. These treasures and specialties – beyond their academic value – also contribute substantially to the profile of the ULB.
