= Schweigger =

Schweigger is a German surname. Notable people with the surname include:

- August Friedrich Schweigger (1783–1821), German naturalist
- Franz Schweigger-Seidel (1834–1871), German physiologist
- Franz Wilhelm Schweigger-Seidel (1795–1838), German physician and chemist
- Johann Schweigger (1779–1857), German chemist, physicist, and professor of mathematics
- Karl Ernst Theodor Schweigger (1830–1905), German ophthalmologist
- Salomon Schweigger (1551–1622), German Lutheran theologian, minister, anthropologist and orientalist

== See also ==
- Schweigger-Seidel sheath, phagocytic sleeve, part of a sheathed arteriole of the spleen
- Schwager
- Schwaiger
- Schweiger
