= Krukenberg =

Krukenberg is a German surname. Notable people with the surname include:

- Carl Friedrich Wilhelm Krukenberg (1852–1889), German biochemist and physiologist
- Friedrich Ernst Krukenberg (1871–1946), German physician
- Gustav Krukenberg (1888–1980), German SS officer
- Hermann Krukenberg (1863–1935), German surgeon
- Peter Krukenberg (1787–1865), German pathologist

== See also ==
- Krukenberg procedure, a surgical technique
- Krukenberg tumor, a type of cancerous tumor
