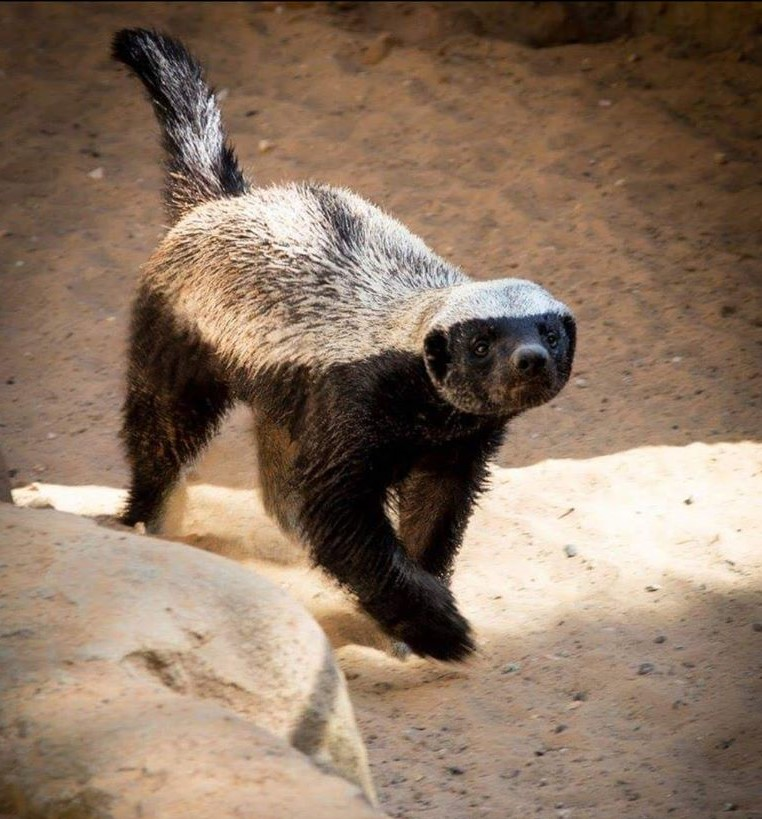
- Honey badger (Mellivora capensis)

Scientific classification
- Kingdom: Animalia
- Phylum: Chordata
- Class: Mammalia
- Order: Carnivora
- Family: Mustelidae
- Subfamily: Mellivorinae; Gray, 1865
- Genus: Mellivora; Storr, 1780

Type species
- Viverra ratel Sparrman, 1777

Species
- Mellivora capensis; †Mellivora benfieldi; †Mellivora indosinica; †Mellivora sivalensis

= Mellivora =

Mellivora Temporal range: Late Miocene - recent

Genus of mammals

Mellivora is a genus of mustelids which contains the honey badger, or ratel (Mellivora capensis), the sole living representative of the subfamily Mellivorinae. Additionally, two extinct species are known. The honey badger is native to much of Africa and South Asia, while fossil relatives occurred in those areas and Southern Europe.

== Taxonomy ==
The genus Mellivora probably evolved from the more primitive †Promellivora punjabiensis of India (which itself was formerly classified as M. punjabiensis). The two genera are grouped together in the tribe Eomellivorini together with the extinct giant mustelids †Eomellivora and †Ekorus.

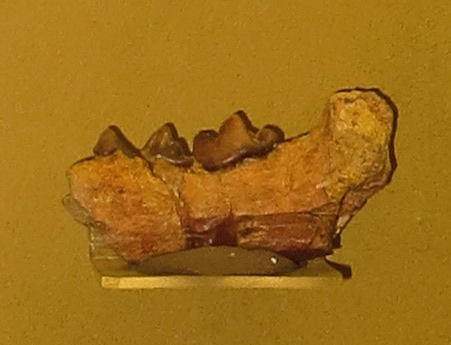
Mandible of M. benfieldi

Mellivora benfieldi is considered a likely ancestor of the living honey badger.

In 2026, a molar of a species of Mellivora was found from the Pleistocene strata from the Tham Hai Cave (Vietnam), representing the first known record of a mellivorinine in Southeast Asia
