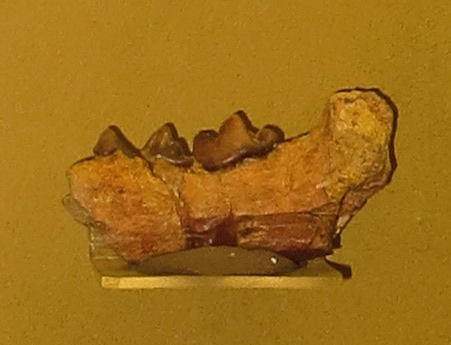
- Mellivora benfieldi mandible

Scientific classification
- Kingdom: Animalia
- Phylum: Chordata
- Class: Mammalia
- Order: Carnivora
- Family: Mustelidae
- Genus: Mellivora
- Species: †M. benfieldi

Binomial name
- †Mellivora benfieldi Hendey, 1978

= Mellivora benfieldi =

Mellivora benfieldi Temporal range: Late Miocene - Early Pliocene 5.3–3.6 Ma

Extinct species of mustelid

Mellivora benfieldi or Benfield's honey badger is an extinct species of mustelid from the Late Miocene and Early Pliocene of Africa and possibly Europe.

== Taxonomy ==
Mellivora benfieldi is considered a likely ancestor of the living honey badger. The genus Mellivora probably evolved from the more primitive Promellivora punjabiensis of India. The two genera are grouped together in the tribe Eomellivorini together with the extinct giant mustelids Eomellivora and Ekorus.

== Distribution ==
Fossils of Mellivora benfieldi were first recovered from Langebaanweg in South Africa. Additional material probably from this species has also been found in the Middle Awash in Ethiopia. Fossils attributed to this species have also been found in southern Europe dated to the end of the Messinian; a migration of African mammals into mediterranean Europe has been noted at that time.

== Description ==
Mellivora benfieldi was similar to the modern honey badger, but slightly smaller in size. Like its living relative, it had adaptations for digging and probably was an opportunistic predator.
