= Pachydermata =

Archaic zoological terminology

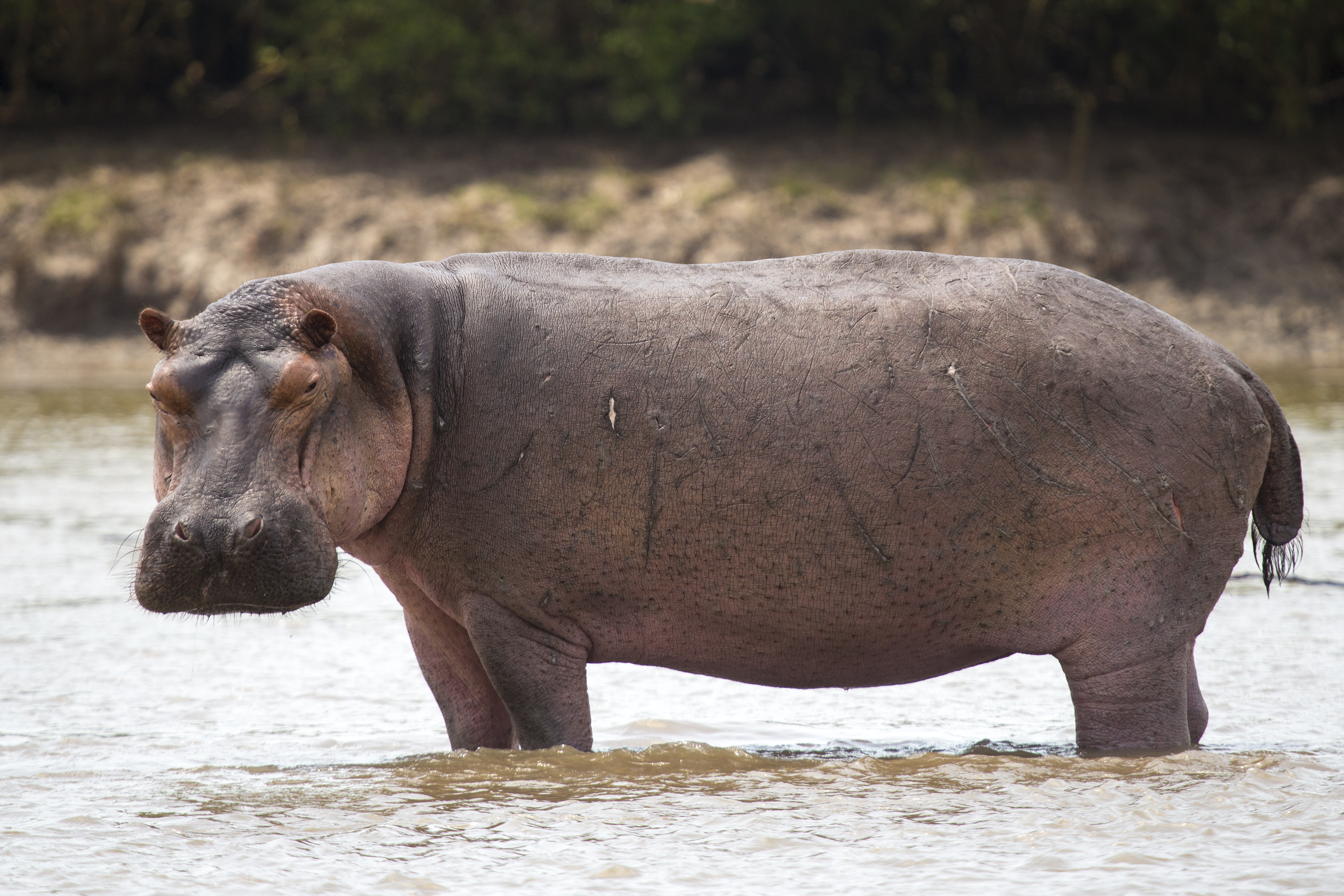
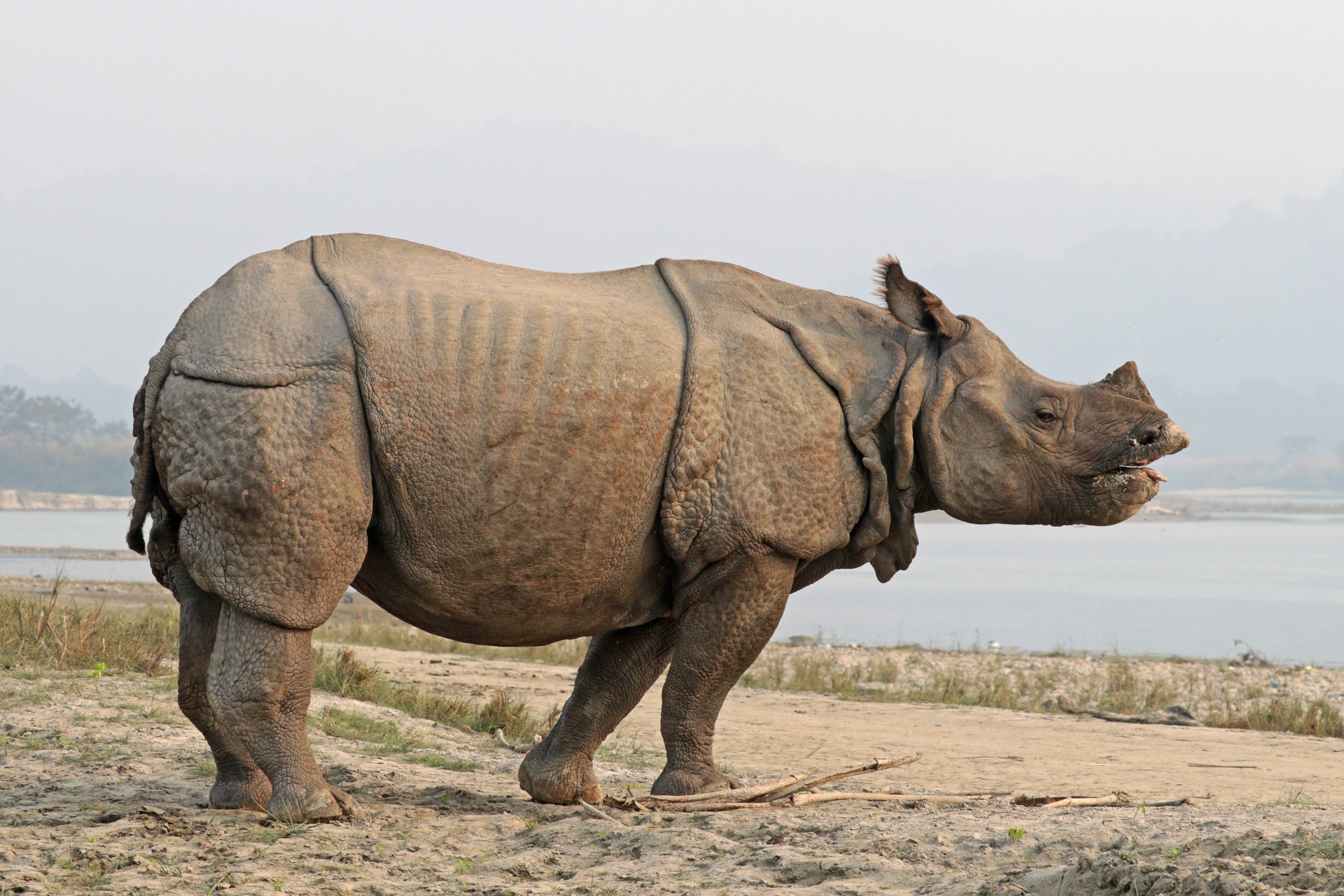
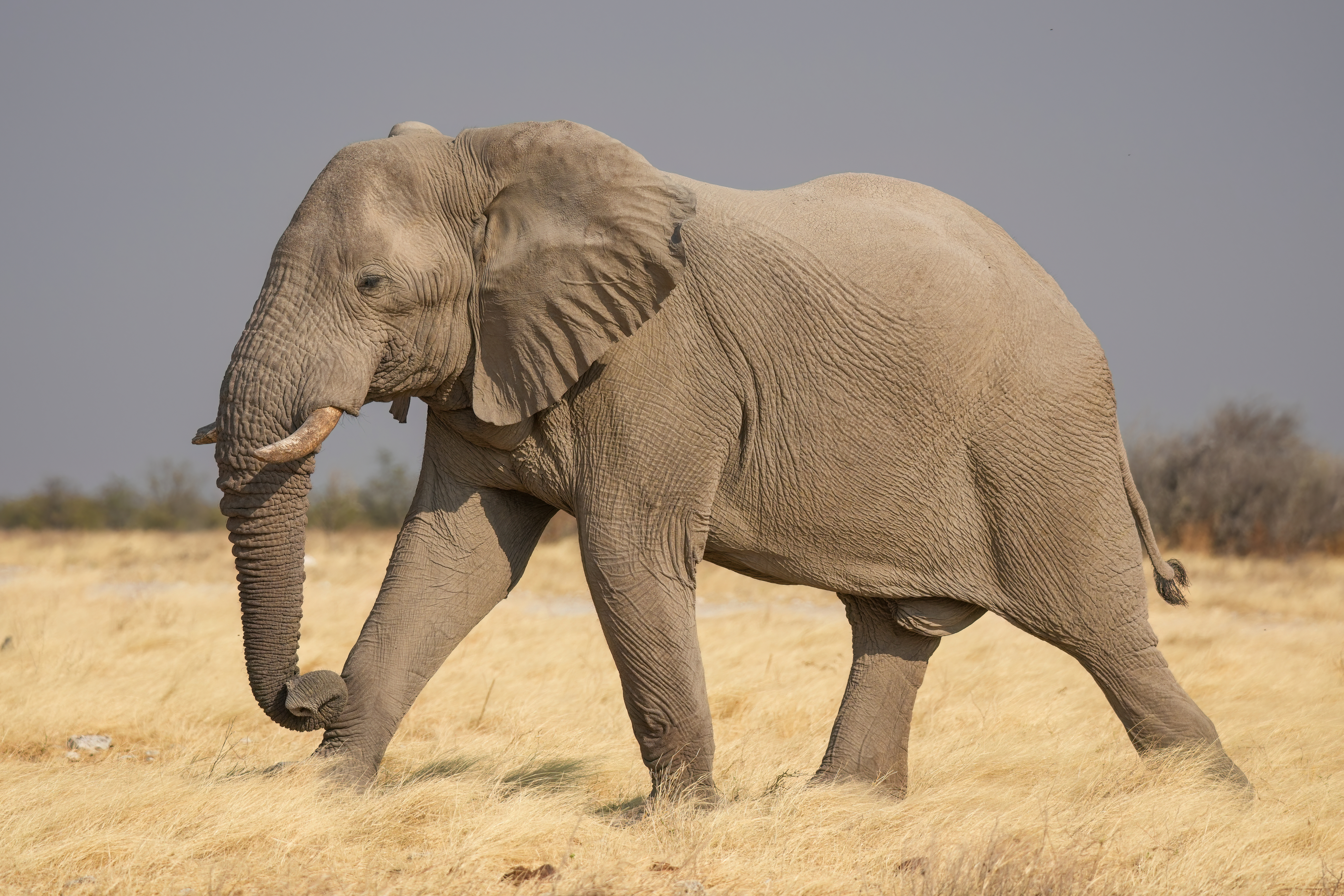
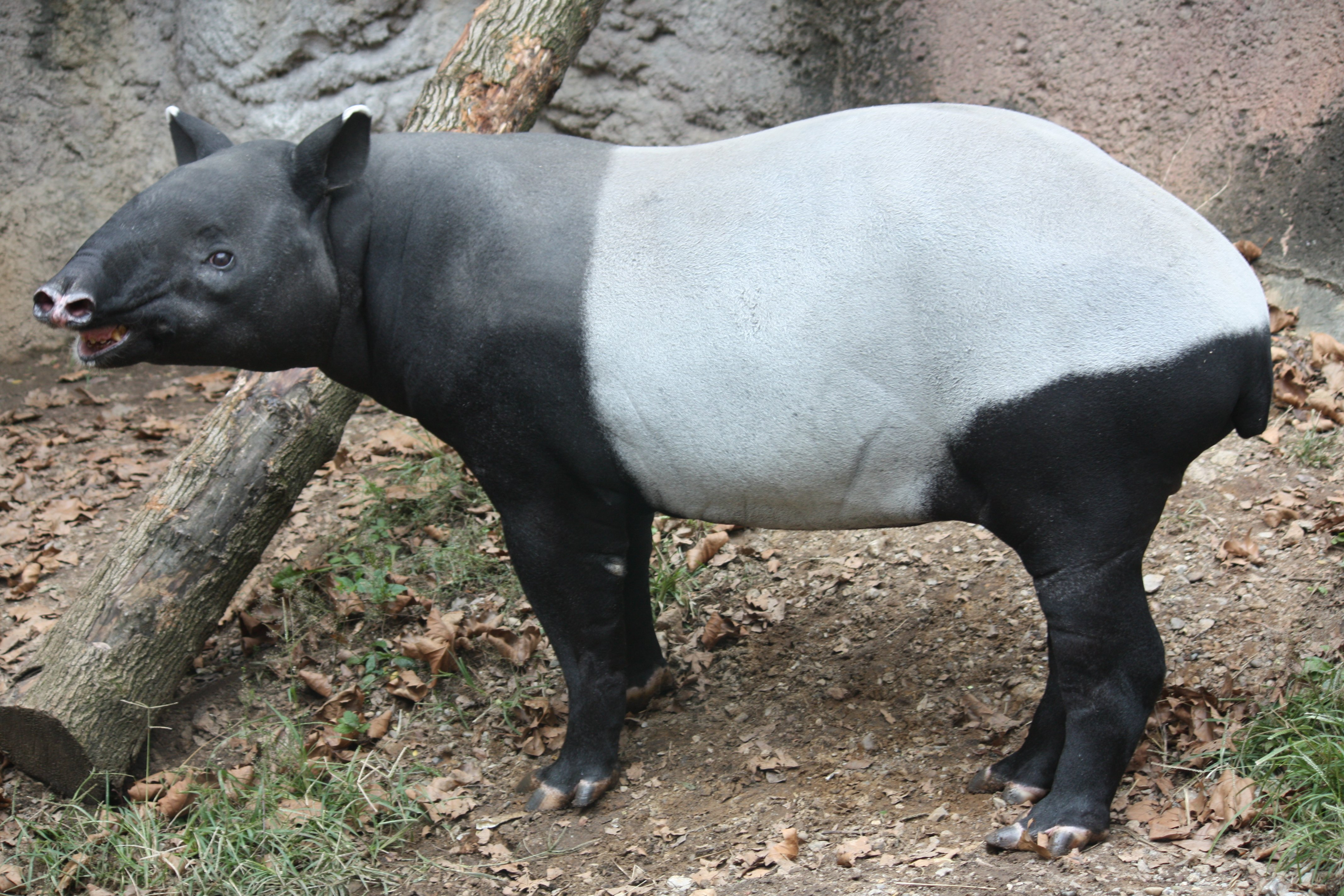
Animals described as pachyderms, clockwise from top left: a hippopotamus, an Indian rhinoceros, a Malayan tapir, and an African bush elephant

Pachydermata (meaning 'thick skin', from the Greek παχύς, pachys, 'thick', and δέρμα, derma, 'skin') is an obsolete order of mammals described by Gottlieb Storr, Georges Cuvier, and others, at one time recognized by many systematists. The term pachyderm is commonly used to describe elephants, rhinoceroses, hippopotamuses and tapirs. The grouping was determined to be artificial as a biological classification was identified from genetic studies.

== Description ==
The grouping is polyphyletic, so the order is no longer in use as a biological classification. Outside strict biological classification, the related term pachyderm is commonly used to describe elephants, rhinoceroses, hippopotamuses and tapirs.

Cuvier himself defined Pachydermata as "animals with hoofs, non ruminants", whereas Storr had described it as "mammals with hoofs with more than two toes". The classification Pachydermata included the three families of mammals he called Proboscidiana, Pachydermata Ordinaria, and Solipedes, which are all herbivorous. The members of the grouping are now divided into the Proboscidea (represented among living species only by three species of elephants), the Perissodactyla (odd-toed ungulates, including horses, tapirs, and rhinoceroses), the Suina (pigs and peccaries), the Hippopotamidae, Hyracoidea (hyraxes) and Sirenians (Manatee and dugong).

The term is important in the history of systematics. Although the former order of Pachydermata is often described as an artificial grouping of unrelated mammals, it was recognised by notable zoologists, including Charles Darwin, as a grade of hoofed mammals to the exception of other ungulates; and anatomical characters support the affinities of "pachyderm" mammals to each other and to other ungulates.

== History ==
In a series of research papers published in 1796, Georges Cuvier created the classification Pachydermata. Cuvier added horses to the order. One naturalist, Delabere Pritchett Blaine, has speculated that:

Baron Cuvier, it is probable, was led to arrange the horse genus among the Pachydermata, less on account of the thickness and tenacity of the skin, than on the slight departure from a true monodactylous character, which every member of this family exhibits in having vestiges of two additional toes under the skin.

— Delabere Pritchett Blaine, An Encyclopaedia of Rural Sports, Vol. 1, page 240

According to genetic studies, elephants, rhinoceroses, tapirs and hippopotamuses are classified as separate clades altogether. Rhinos, hippos, pigs, peccaries, horses, zebras, donkeys and tapirs are classified in clade Laurasiatheria, while elephants, hyraxes, manatees and dugongs are classified in clade Afrotheria.
