= Peter Krukenberg =

German pathologist

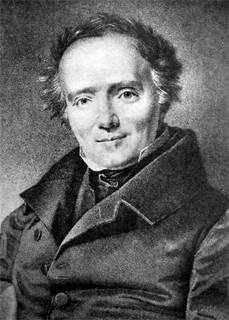
Peter Krukenberg (1787-1865)

Peter Krukenberg (14 February 1787 – 13 December 1865) was a German pathologist who was a native of Königslutter. He was son-in-law to anatomist Johann Christian Reil (1759–1813), and grandfather to pathologist Friedrich Ernst Krukenberg (1871–1946) and surgeon Hermann Krukenberg (1863–1935).

He studied at the Collegium Carolinum in Braunschweig and at the Universities of Göttingen and Berlin. In 1814 he became an associate professor of pathology and therapy at the University of Halle, and from 1822 to 1856 was a full professor of pathology and director of the university clinic. In 1816, Krukenberg founded an ambulatory clinic at Halle. Two of his better-known assistants were dermatologist Friedrich Wilhelm Felix von Bärensprung (1822–1864) and ophthalmologist Karl Ernst Theodor Schweigger (1830–1905).

Krukenberg was a pioneer of scientific knowledge-based medicine and was considered one of the leading clinicians of his era. He was responsible for integrating clinical training into the fields of surgery, gynecology, psychiatry, et al., and is credited for helping to establish the University of Halle as a primary center of medical learning in 19th-century Germany.

In 1840, he was elected a foreign member of the Royal Swedish Academy of Sciences. He was author of "Jahrbücher der ambulatorischen Klinik in Halle" (Yearbook of the ambulatory clinic at Halle; 1820–24, 2 volumes).
