= Johann Friedrich Gmelin =

German naturalist, chemist, and biologist (1748–1804)

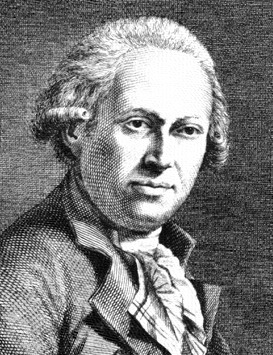
- Born: 8 August 1748; Tübingen, Holy Roman Empire
- Died: 1 November 1804 (aged 56); Göttingen, Electorate of Brunswick-Lüneburg
- Citizenship: German
- Education: University of Tübingen
- Known for: Textbooks on chemistry, pharmaceutical science, mineralogy, and botany
- Spouse: Rosine Louise Gmelin (1755–1828, née Schott)
- Father: Philipp Friedrich Gmelin
- Relatives: Leopold Gmelin (son)
- Scientific career
- Fields: Naturalist, botanist, and entomologist
- Workplaces: University of Göttingen; University of Tübingen
- Thesis: Latin: Irritabilitatem vegetabilium, in singulis plantarum partibus exploratam ulterioribusque experimentis confirmatam
- Doctoral advisor: Philipp Friedrich Gmelin; Ferdinand Christoph Oetinger
- Doctoral students: Georg Friedrich Hildebrandt; Friedrich Stromeyer; Carl Friedrich Kielmeyer; Wilhelm August Lampadius; Vasily Severgin
- Author abbrev. (botany): J.F.Gmel.
- Author abbrev. (zoology): Gmelin

Johann Friedrich Gmelin (8 August 1748 – 1 November 1804) was a German naturalist, chemist, botanist, entomologist, herpetologist, and malacologist.

== Education ==
Johann Friedrich Gmelin was born as the eldest son of Philipp Friedrich Gmelin in 1748 in Tübingen. He studied medicine under his father at University of Tübingen and graduated with a master's degree in 1768, with a thesis entitled: Irritabilitatem vegetabilium, in singulis plantarum partibus exploratam ulterioribusque experimentis confirmatam, defended under the presidency of Ferdinand Christoph Oetinger, whom he thanks with the words Patrono et praeceptore in aeternum pie devenerando, pro summis in medicina obtinendis honoribus.

== Career ==
In 1769, Gmelin became an adjunct professor of medicine at University of Tübingen. In 1773, he became professor of philosophy and adjunct professor of medicine at University of Göttingen. He was promoted to full professor of medicine and professor of chemistry, botany, and mineralogy in 1778. He died in 1804 in Göttingen and is buried there in the Albani cemetery with his wife Rosine Louise Gmelin (1755–1828, née Schott).

Johann Friedrich Gmelin when young became a respected colleague of Carl Linnaeus and collected plants in Persia on his behalf. Later in life he published several textbooks in the fields of chemistry, pharmaceutical science, mineralogy, and botany. He also edited and published the posthumous 13th edition of Systema Naturae by Carl Linnaeus from 1788 to 1793. This contained descriptions and scientific names of many new species, including birds that had earlier been catalogued without a scientific name by John Latham in his A General Synopsis of Birds. Gmelin's publication is cited as the authority for over 290 bird speciesand also a number of butterfly species.

== Legacy ==
Among his students were Georg Friedrich Hildebrandt, Carl Friedrich Kielmeyer, Friedrich Stromeyer, and Wilhelm August Lampadius. He was the father of Leopold Gmelin.

He described the redfin pickerel in 1789. In the scientific field of herpetology, he described many new species of amphibians and reptiles. In the field of malacology, he described and named many species of gastropods.

The plant genus Gmelina was named after J.F. Gmelin (or possibly J.G. Gmelin, or both) by Linnaeus.

The abbreviation "Gmel." is also found.

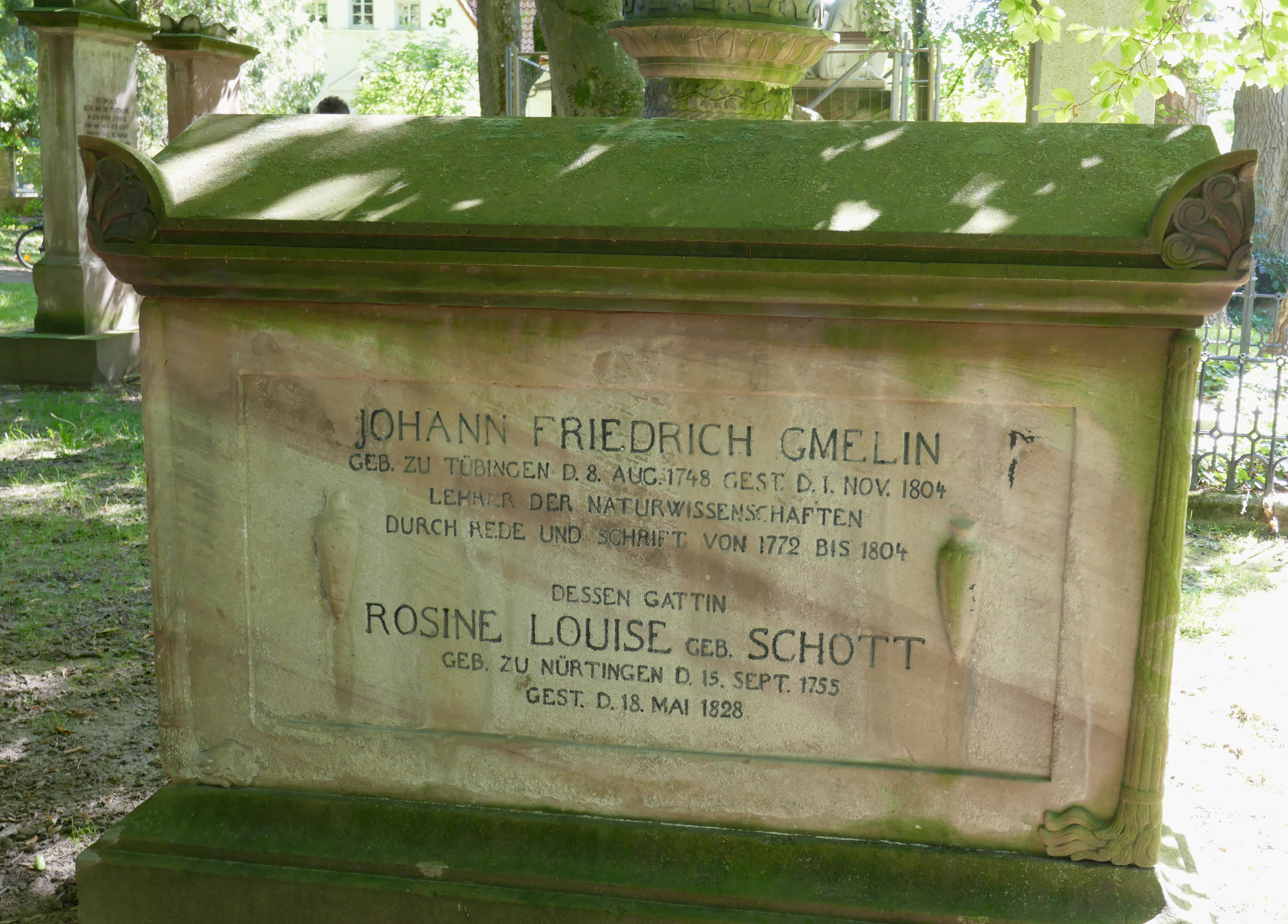
Tomb in the Albani cemetery in Göttingen

== Publications ==
- Gmelin, Johann Friedrich; Ferdinand Christoph Oetinger (1768). Irritabilitatem vegetabilium, in singulis plantarum partibus exploratam ulterioribusque experimentis confirmatam. Thesis Tübingen. OCLC 10717434.
- Allgemeine Geschichte der Gifte, 2 Vol., 1776/77 Digital edition of the University and State Library Düsseldorf.
- Allgemeine Geschichte der Pflanzengifte, 1777
- Allgemeine Geschichte der mineralischen Gifte. Nürnberg: Raspe, 1777. Digital edition of the University and State Library Düsseldorf.
- Johann Friedrich Gmelins ... Einleitung in die Chemie zum Gebrauch auf Universitäten. Nürnberg: Raspe, 1780. Digital edition of the University and State Library Düsseldorf.
- Einleitung in die Pharmacie. Nürnberg: Raspe, 1781. Digital edition of the University and State Library Düsseldorf.
- Beyträge zur Geschichte des teutschen Bergbaus, 1783
- Über die neuere Entdeckungen in der Lehre von der Luft, und deren Anwendung auf Arzneikunst, in Briefen an einen Arzt, von J. F. Gmelin, 1784
- Grundsätze der technischen Chemie, 1786
- Caroli a Linné, equitis aurati de stella polari, … Systema naturae per regna tria naturae, secundum classes, ordines, genera, species, cum characteribus, differentiis, synonymis, locis. Editio decima tertia, aucta, reformata, Lipsiae [Leipzig], Georg Emanuel Beer, 1788–1793
- Grundriß der Pharmazie, 1792
- Apparatus Medicaminum tam simplicium quam praeparatorum et compositorum in Praxeos Adiumentum consideratus, Ps. 2, T. 1 – Ps. 2, T. 2., 1795–1796. Digital edition of the University and State Library Düsseldorf.
- Geschichte der Chemie, 1799
- Allgemeine Geschichte der thierischen und mineralischen Gifte, 1806

== See also ==
- Category:Taxa named by Johann Friedrich Gmelin
