= Schweiger =

Schweiger is a German surname derived from the verb schweigen ("to be silent"). It originated as a nickname given to a silent, quiet, or taciturn person. Modern variants of the surname include Schwager, Schwaiger, Schweigert and Schweigerdt.

- Dana Schweiger (née Carlsen, born 1968), American television personality, entrepreneur and model
- Edward Schweiger (active 1908–1940), Australian Anglican priest
- Emma Schweiger (born 2002), German-American actress
- Hans-Georg Schweiger (1927–1986), German cell biologist
- Heinrich Schweiger (1931–2009), Austrian actor
- Kurt Schweiger (born 1934), Austrian cyclist
- Martin Schweiger (active 2000–2021), German computer scientist working in UK
- Rolf Schweiger (1945–2025), Swiss politician
- Solomon Schweiger (or Schweigger, 1551–1622), German Lutheran theologian, minister, anthropologist and orientalist
- Sylvia Schweiger (born 1959), Austrian cross-country skier
- Til Schweiger, German actor and film director
  - Luna Schweiger (born 1997), German actress
  - Lilli Schweiger (born 1998), German actress
  - Emma Schweiger (born 2002), German actress
- Torsten Schweiger (born 1968), German politician

== See also ==
- Schwaiger, a surname
- Schweigger, a surname
- Schwieger, a surname
