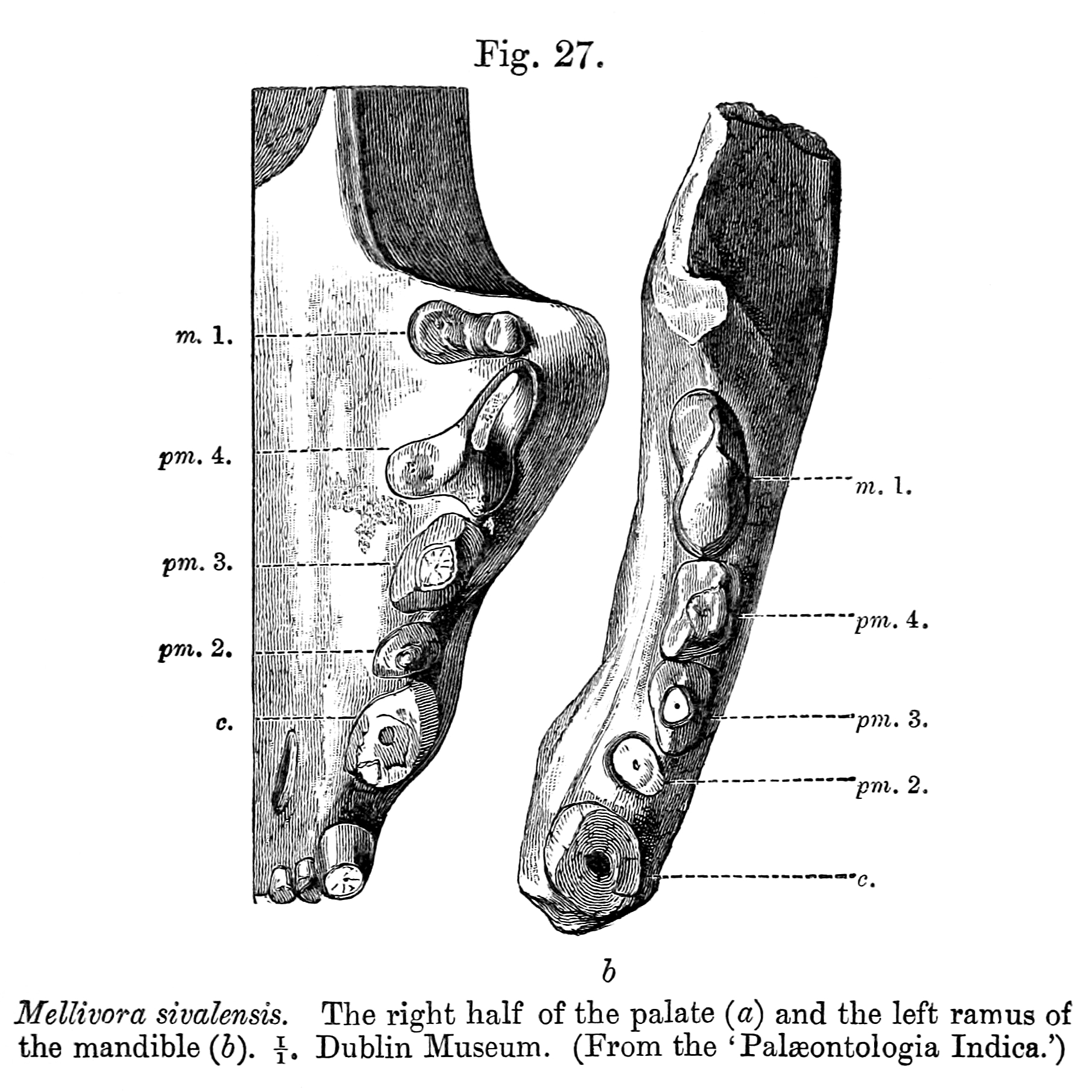

Scientific classification
- Kingdom: Animalia
- Phylum: Chordata
- Class: Mammalia
- Order: Carnivora
- Family: Mustelidae
- Genus: Mellivora
- Species: †M. sivalensis

Binomial name
- †Mellivora sivalensis Falconer & Cautley, 1868

Synonyms
- Ursitaxus sivalensis

= Mellivora sivalensis =

Mellivora sivalensis Temporal range: Pleistocene, 2.58–0.7 Ma

Extinct species of mustelid

Mellivora sivalensis is an extinct species of mustelid that lived in the Pliocene and is known from the Siwaliks of India and Pakistan.

It is a poorly known species, originally classified as Ursitaxus sivalensis. It was similar to the modern Indian ratel, but was larger and had proportionately larger premolars.
