= Georg Friedrich Hildebrandt =

German chemist (1764–1816)

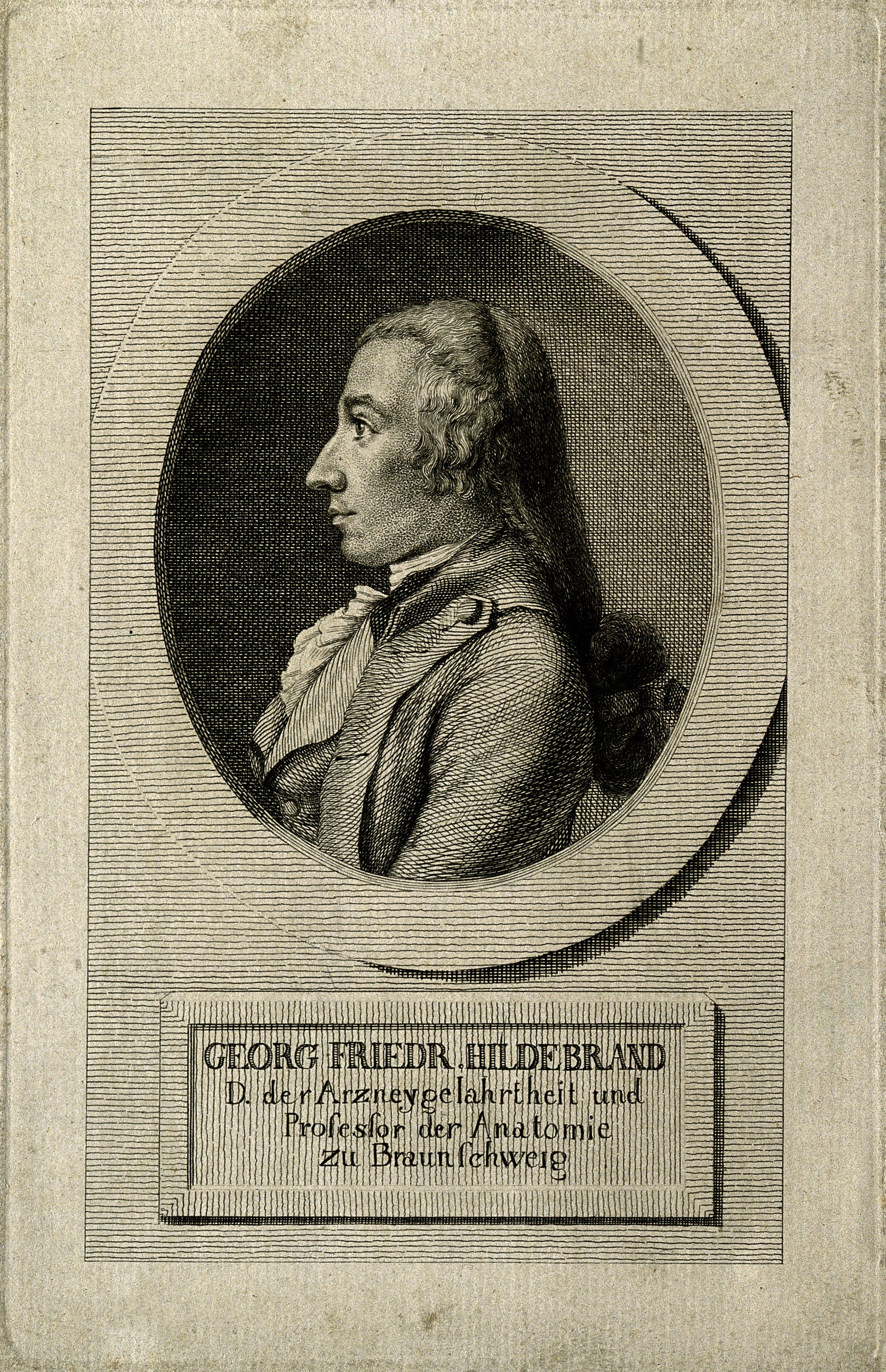
- Portrait. Credit: Wellcome Collection
- Born: 5 June 1764; Hanover
- Died: 23 March 1816 (aged 51); Erlangen
- Education: University of Göttingen
- Scientific career
- Fields: Pharmacist, chemist, and anatomist
- Workplaces: University of Erlangen
- Doctoral advisor: Johann Friedrich Gmelin
- Doctoral students: Johann Salomo Christoph Schweigger

Signature
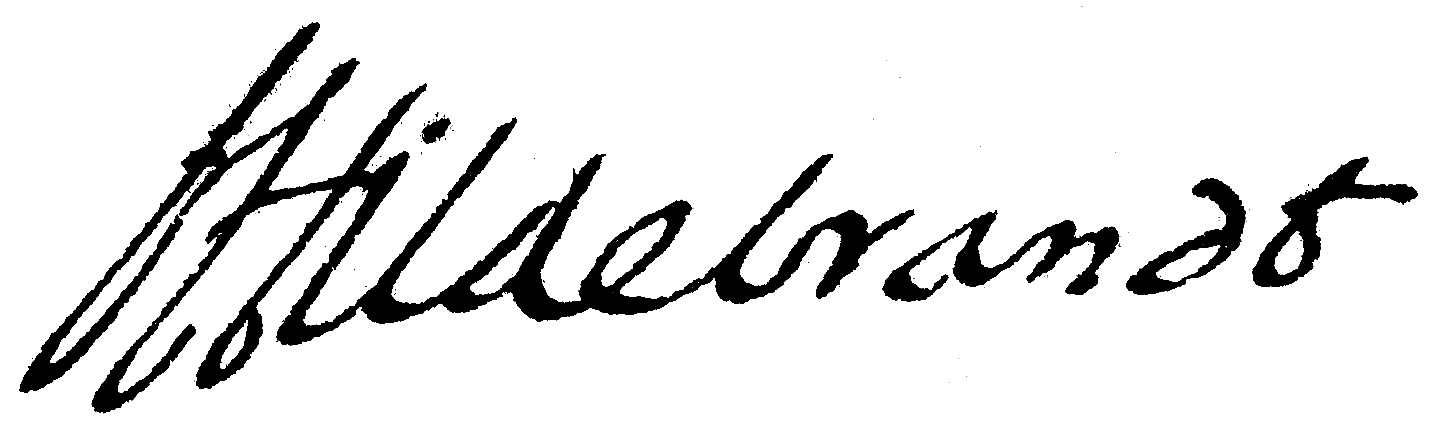

Georg Friedrich Hildebrandt (5 June 1764 – 23 March 1816) was a pharmacist, chemist, and anatomist. He was an early supporter of Lavoisier's theories in Germany. He investigated mercury compounds, and the chemical nature of quicklime, ammonium nitrate, and ammonia. He studied light emitted by electric discharges through air and investigated the use of nitric oxide to determine the oxygen content of air. He developed a method to separate silver from copper. He wrote textbooks on pharmacology and human anatomy, and treatises on smallpox, sleep, and the digestive system.

He obtained his MD in 1783 from the University of Göttingen under Johann Friedrich Gmelin.

== Works ==
- Anfangsgründe der Chemie . Vol. 3 . Erlangen : Walther, 1794 Digital edition by the University and State Library Düsseldorf
