= Ferdinand Christoph Oetinger =

German physician (1719–1772)

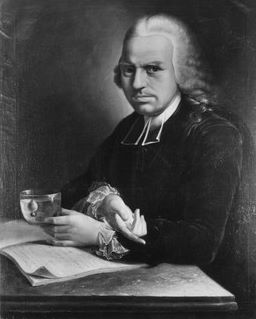
- Ferdinand Christoph Oetinger (1719–1772)
- Born: 18 February 1719; Göppingen
- Died: 15 April 1772 (aged 53); Tübingen
- Occupation: German physician

Ferdinand Christoph Oetinger (18 February 1719 – 15 April 1772) was a German physician.

He studied philosophy at the University of Tübingen and medicine at the Universities of Leipzig and Halle, obtaining his doctorate at the latter institution in 1739. He later practiced medicine in Stuttgart and Urach, and in 1760 was named an associate professor of medicine at the University of Tübingen. In 1762 he became a full professor of medicine at Tübingen.

== Published works ==
- "De belladonna tanquam specifico in cancro imprimis occulto", 1739 (advisor Michael Alberti), graduate thesis at Halle.
- "Cinnabaris exul redux in pharmacopolium", 1760 (with Christian Gottlieb Reuss).
- "Problema practicum an achorum insitio, imitando variolarum insitionem, pro curandis pueritiae morbis rebellibus tuto tentari possit", 1762 (with Samuel Gottlieb Gmelin).
- "Dissertatio inavgvralis physico-medica, de vi corporvm organisatorvm assimilatrici", 1766 (with Wilhelm Gottfried Ploucquet, respondent).
- "Dissertatio inauguralis medica de antagonismo musculorum", 1767 (with Christian Friedrich Jaeger).
- "Irritabilitatem vegetabilium in singulis plantarum partibus exploratam, ulterioribusque experimentis confirmatam", 1768 (with Johann Friedrich Gmelin, respondent).
- "Dissertatio inauguralis medica, de curis viperinis", 1768 (with Gottlieb Conrad Christian Storr, respondent).
- "Dissertatio medica de ortu dentium, et symptomatibus quae circa dentitionem infantum occurrunt", 1770 (with Wolfgang Heinrich Moser, respondent).
