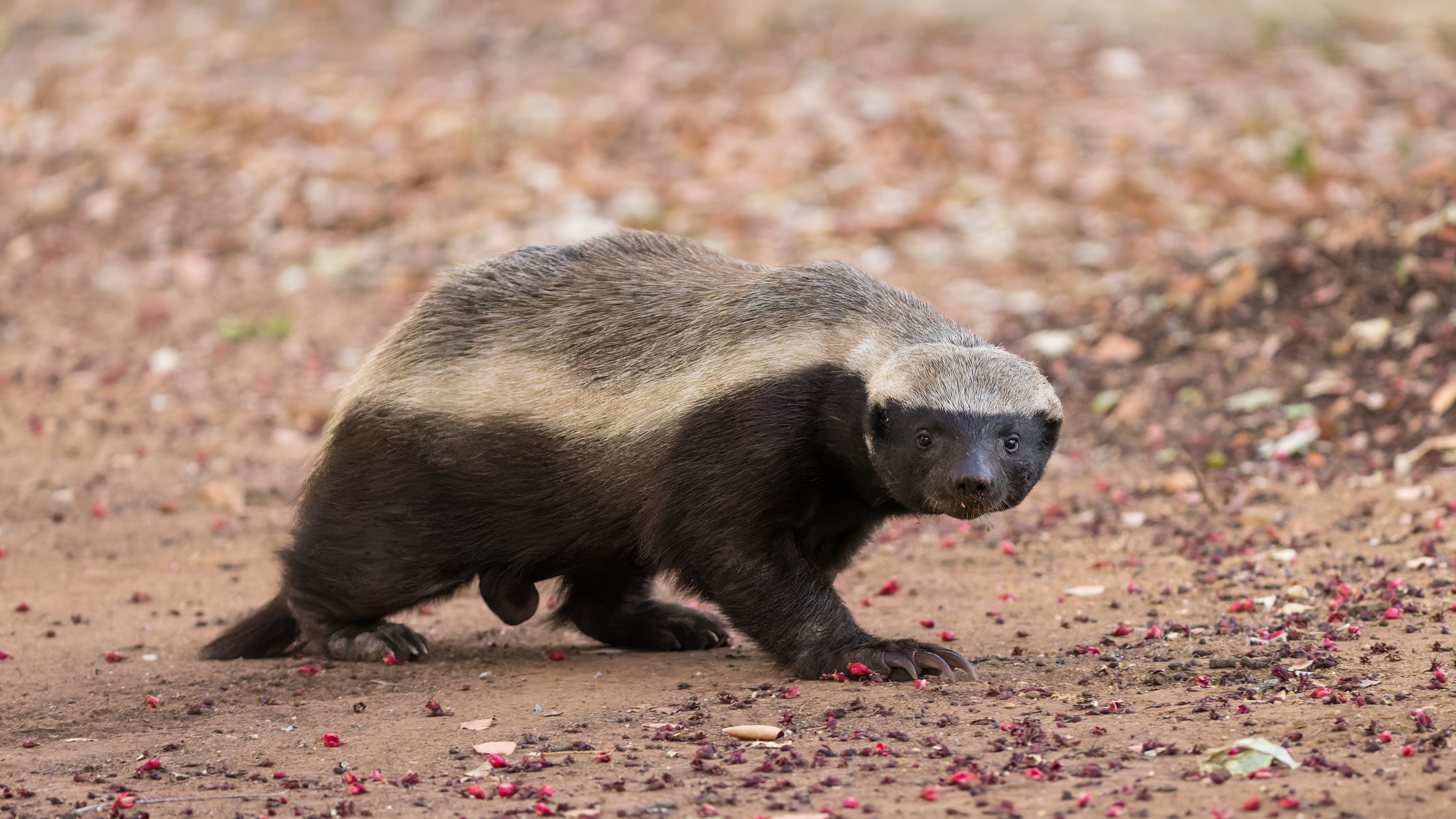
- Adult at Satara camp in Kruger National Park, South Africa.

Conservation status
- Least Concern (IUCN 3.1)
- CITES Appendix III

Scientific classification
- Kingdom: Animalia
- Phylum: Chordata
- Class: Mammalia
- Order: Carnivora
- Family: Mustelidae
- Genus: Mellivora
- Species: M. capensis

Binomial name
- Mellivora capensis (Schreber, 1776)
- Ratel distribution Extant (resident)

= Honey badger =

Honey badger Temporal range: middle Pliocene – Recent

Species of mammal

The honey badger (Mellivora capensis), also known as the ratel (/ˈrɑːtəl/ or /ˈreɪtəl/), is a mammal widely distributed across Africa, Southwest Asia, and the Indian subcontinent. It is the sole living representative of the Mellivorinae subfamily of the Mustelidae.

It has a fairly long body, with a distinctly thick-set and broad back, and remarkably loose skin, allowing the badger to turn and twist freely within it. The largest terrestrial mustelid in Africa, the honey badger measures 55 to 77 cm (22 to 30 in) long and weighs up to 16 kg (35 lb). Sexual dimorphism has been recorded in this species, with males being larger and heavier than females. It has two pairs of mammae, and an eversible anal pouch.

The honey badger is a solitary animal that can be active at any time of day, depending on the location. It is primarily a carnivorous species and has few natural predators because of its thick skin, strength and ferocious defensive abilities. Adults maintain large home ranges, and display scent-marking behavior. The species has no fixed breeding period. After a gestation of 50–70 days, a female will give birth to an average of one to two cubs that will remain under her care for 1–1 1/4 years. Because of its wide range and occurrence in a variety of habitats, it is listed as least concern on the IUCN Red List. In popular media, the honey badger is best known as an aggressive, intelligent animal that is fearless and tough in nature.

== Taxonomy ==
Viverra capensis was the scientific name used by Johann Christian Daniel von Schreber in 1777 who described a honey badger skin from the Cape of Good Hope. Mellivorae was proposed as name for the genus by Gottlieb Conrad Christian Storr in 1780, while Mellivorina was proposed as a tribe name by John Edward Gray in 1865. The honey badger is the only living species of the genus Mellivora. Although in the 1860s it was assigned to the badger subfamily, the Melinae, it is now generally agreed that it bears few similarities to the Melinae. It is much more closely related to the marten subfamily, Guloninae, and furthermore is assigned its own subfamily, Mellivorinae.

=== Subspecies ===
In the 19th and 20th centuries, 16 zoological specimens of the honey badger were described and proposed as subspecies. Points taken into consideration in assigning different subspecies include size and the extent of whiteness or greyness on the back. As of 2005, 12 subspecies are recognised as valid taxa:

Subspecies and authority	Description	Range	Synonyms
Cape ratel (M. c. capensis) (Schreber, 1776)		South and southwestern Africa	mellivorus (Cuvier, 1798) ratel (Sparrman, 1777) typicus (Smith, 1833) vernayi (Roberts, 1932)
Indian ratel (M. c. indica) (Kerr, 1792)	Distinguished from capensis by its smaller size, paler fur and having a less distinct lateral white band separating the upper white and lower black areas of the body	Western Middle Asia northward to the Ustyurt Plateau and eastward to Amu Darya. Outside the former Soviet Union, its range includes Afghanistan, Iran (except the southwestern part), western Pakistan and western India	mellivorus (Bennett, 1830) ratel (Horsfield, 1851) ratelus (Fraser, 1862)
Nepalese ratel (M. c. inaurita) (Hodgson, 1836)	Distinguished from indica by its longer, much woollier coat and having overgrown hair on its heels	Nepal and contiguous areas east of it	
White-backed ratel (M. c. leuconota) (Sclater, 1867)	The entire upper side from the face to half-way along the tail is pure creamy white with little admixture of black hairs	West Africa, southern Morocco, former French Congo	
Black ratel (M. c. cottoni) (Lydekker, 1906)	The fur is typically entirely black, with thin and harsh hairs.	Ghana, northeastern Congo	sagulata (Hollister, 1910)
Lake Chad ratel (M. c. concisa) (Thomas and Wroughton, 1907)	The coat on the back consists largely of very long, pure white bristle-hairs amongst long, fine, black underfur. Its distinguishing feature from other subspecies is the lack of the usual white bristle-hairs in the lumbar area	Sahel and Sudan zones, as far as Somaliland	brockmani (Wroughton and Cheesman, 1920) buchanani (Thomas, 1925)
Speckled ratel (M. c. signata) (Pocock, 1909)	Although its pelage is the normal dense white over the crown, this pale colour starts to thin out over the neck and shoulders, continuing to the rump where it fades into black. It possesses an extra lower molar on the left side of the jaw	Sierra Leone	
Ethiopian ratel (M. c. abyssinica) (Hollister, 1910)		Ethiopia	
Persian ratel (M. c. wilsoni) (Cheesman, 1920)		Southwestern Iran and Iraq	
Kenyan ratel (M. c. maxwelli) (Thomas, 1923)		Kenya	
Arabian ratel (M. c. pumilio) Pocock, 1946		Hadhramaut, southern Arabia	
Turkmenian ratel (M. c. buechneri) Baryshnikov, 2000	Similar to the subspecies indica and inaurita, but is distinguished by its larger size and narrower postorbital constriction	Turkmenistan	

=== Evolution ===
The species first appeared during the middle Pliocene in Asia. A number of extinct relatives are known dating back at least 7 million years to the Late Miocene. These include Mellivora benfieldi from South Africa and Italy, Promellivora from Pakistan, and Howellictis from Chad. More distant relatives include Eomellivora, which evolved into several different species in both the Old and New Worlds, and the giant, long-legged Ekorus from Kenya.

== Etymology ==
The genus name, Mellivora, is derived from Latin, meaning "honey eater", while the species name, capensis, pertains to the location where the type specimen was discovered: the Cape of Good Hope. The origin of the word ratel is uncertain, but is thought to either be derived from ratel, which is Dutch for rattle or from the Dutch word raat, meaning honeycomb.

== Description ==
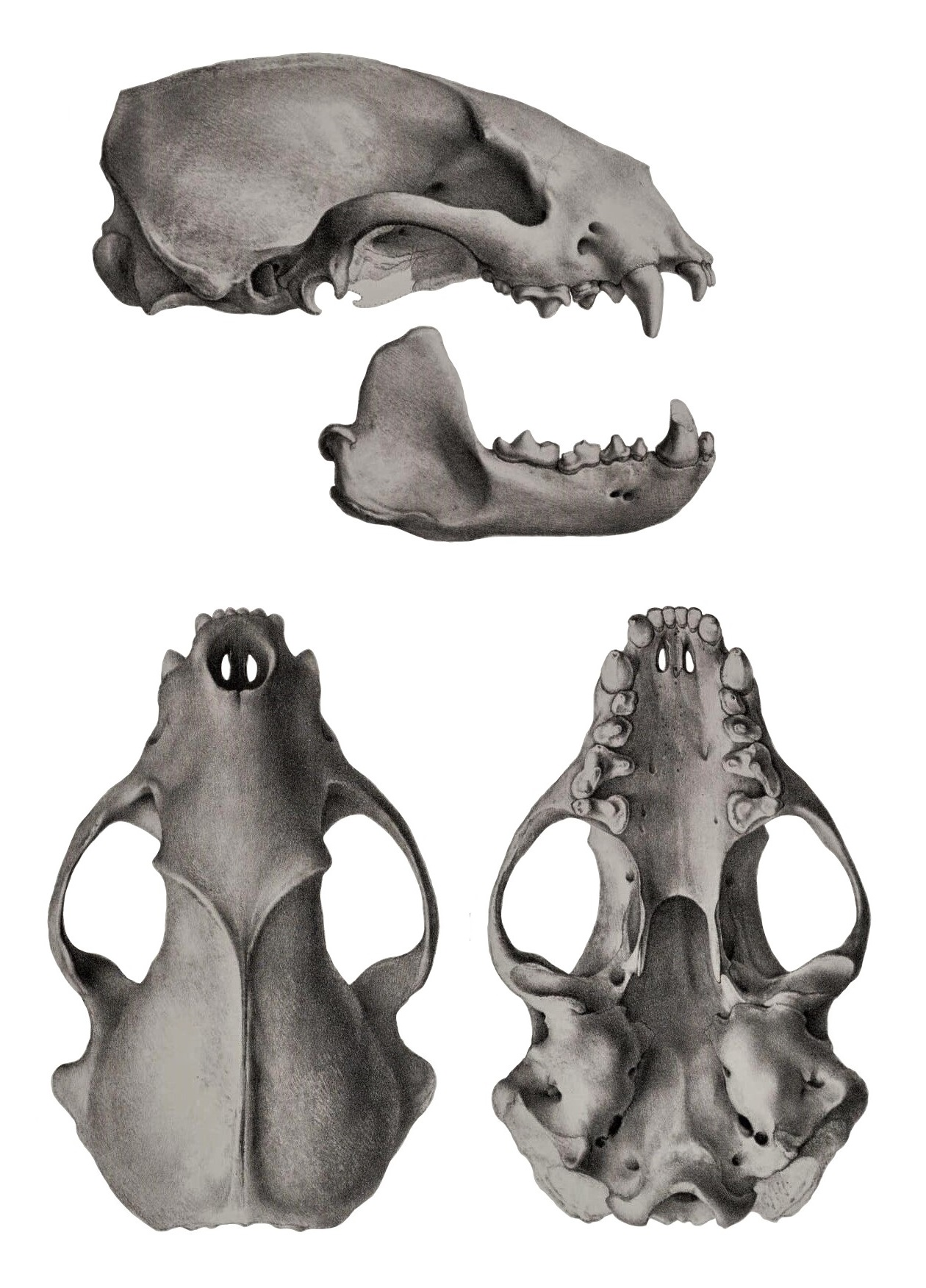
Skull

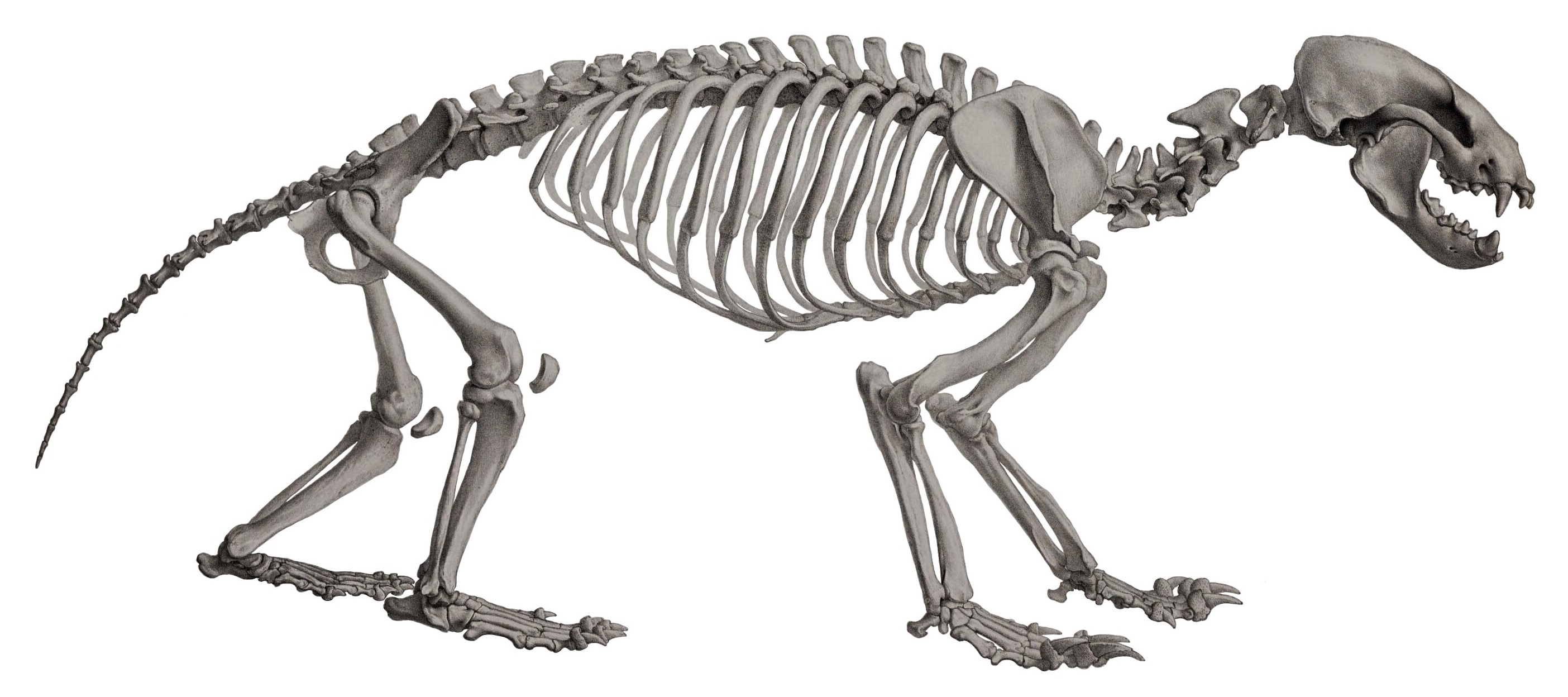
Skeleton

The honey badger has a fairly long body but is distinctly thick-set and broad across the back. Its skin is remarkably loose, and allows the animal to turn and twist freely within it. The skin around the neck is 6 mm (0.24 in) thick, an adaptation to fighting conspecifics. The head is small and flat, with a short muzzle. The eyes are small, and the ears are little more than ridges on the skin, another possible adaptation to avoiding damage while fighting. The honey badger has short and sturdy legs, with five toes on each foot. The feet are armed with very strong claws, which are short on the hind legs and remarkably long on the forelimbs. It is a partially plantigrade animal whose soles are thickly padded and naked up to the wrists. The tail is short and is covered in long hairs, save for below the base.

The honey badger is the largest terrestrial mustelid in Africa. Adults measure 23 to 28 cm (9.1 to 11.0 in) in shoulder height and 55–77 cm (22–30 in) in body length, with the tail adding another 12–30 cm (4.7–11.8 in). Females are smaller than males. In Africa, males weigh 9 to 16 kg (20 to 35 lb) while females weigh 5 to 10 kg (11 to 22 lb) on average. The mean weight of adult honey badgers from different areas has been reported at anywhere between 6.4 to 12 kg (14 to 26 lb), with a median of roughly 9 kg (20 lb), per various studies. This positions it as the third largest known badger, after the European badger and hog badger, and fourth largest extant terrestrial mustelid after additionally the wolverine. However, the average weight of three wild females from Iraq was reported as 18 kg (40 lb), about the typical weight of male wolverines or male European badgers in late autumn, indicating that they can attain much larger than typical sizes in favourable conditions. However, an adult female and two males in India were relatively small weighing 6.4 kg (14 lb) and a median of 8.4 kg (19 lb). Skull length is 13.9–14.5 cm (5.5–5.7 in) in males and 13 cm (5.1 in) for females.

The honey badger has two pairs of mammae. It has an eversible anal pouch, a trait shared with hyenas and mongooses. The smell of the pouch is reportedly "suffocating" and may assist in calming bees when raiding beehives.

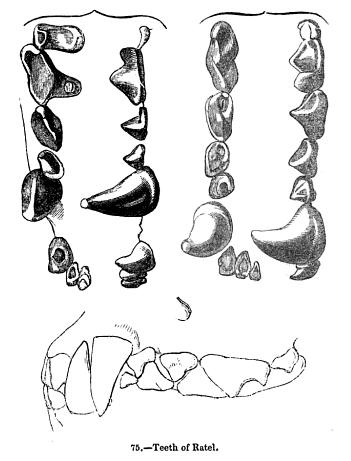
Honey badger teeth

The skull greatly resembles a larger version of that of a marbled polecat. The dental formula is: 3.1.3.13.1.3.1. The teeth often display signs of irregular development, with some teeth being exceptionally small, set at unusual angles or absent altogether. Honey badgers of the subspecies signata have a second lower molar on the left side of their jaws, but not the right. Although it feeds predominantly on soft foods, the honey badger's cheek teeth are often extensively worn. The canine teeth are exceptionally short for carnivores. The papillae of the tongue are sharp and pointed, which assists in processing tough foods.

The winter fur is long, being 40–50 mm (1.6–2.0 in) long on the lower back, and consists of sparse, coarse, bristle-like hairs, with minimal underfur. Hairs are even sparser on the flanks, belly and groin. The summer fur is shorter (being only 15 mm (0.59 in) long on the back) and even sparser, with the belly being half bare. The sides of the head and lower body are pure black. A large white band covers the upper body, from the top of the head to the base of the tail. Honey badgers of the cottoni subspecies are unique in being completely black.

== Distribution and habitat ==
The honey badger ranges through most of sub-Saharan Africa, from the Western Cape, South Africa, to southern Morocco and southwestern Algeria and outside Africa through Arabia, Iran, and Western Asia to Turkmenistan and the Indian Peninsula. It is known to range from sea level to as much as 2,600 m (8,500 ft) in the Moroccan High Atlas and 4,000 m (13,000 ft) in Ethiopia's Bale Mountains. Throughout its range, the honey badger is predominantly found in deserts, mountainous regions and forests. These habitats can have an annual rainfall of as low as 100 mm in dry, arid regions to as high as 2,000 mm.

== Behaviour and ecology ==
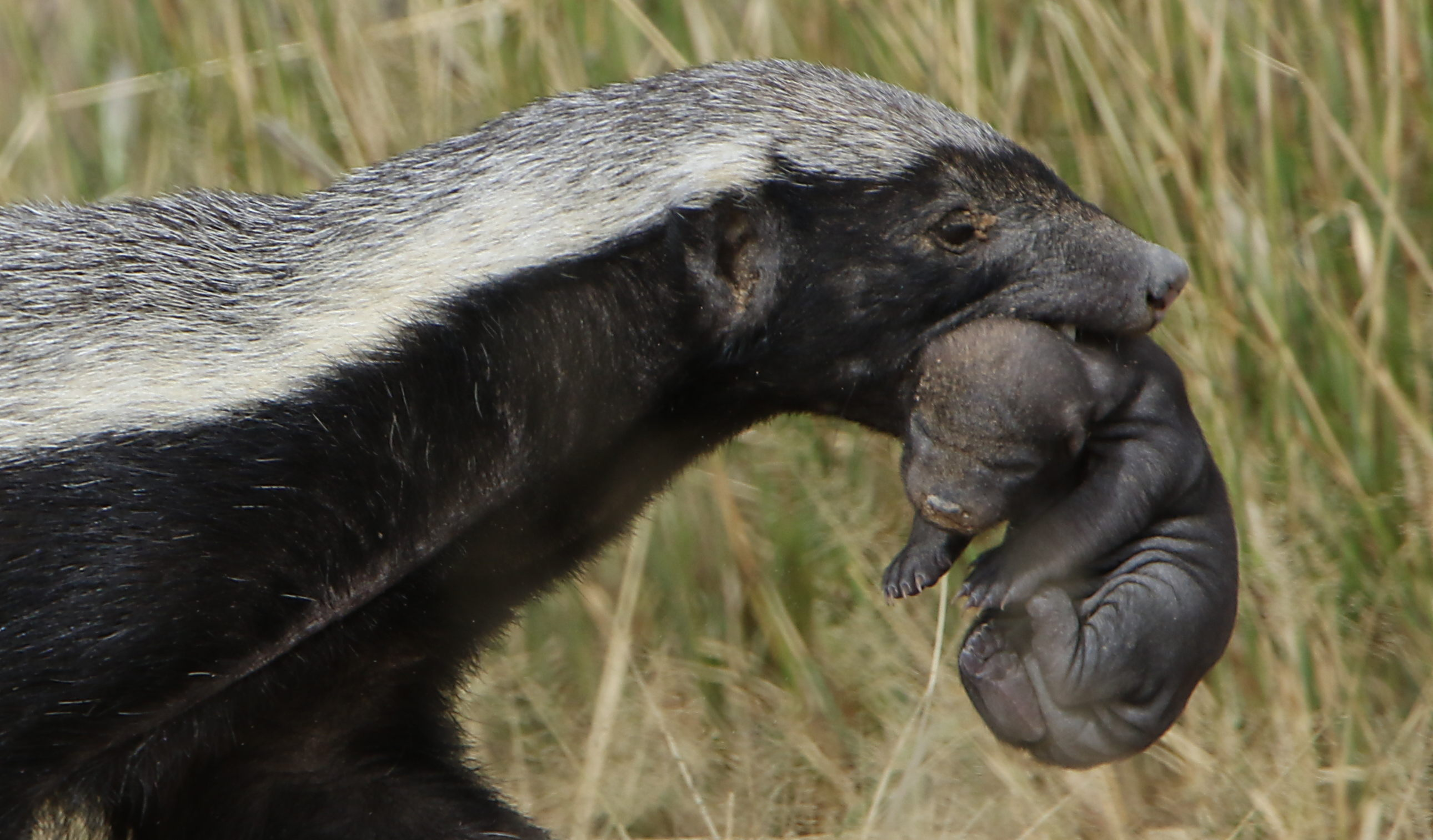
Adult carrying a kit in the Kgalagadi Transfrontier Park, South Africa

The honey badger is mostly solitary but has been seen in Africa hunting in pairs. It also uses old burrows of aardvark, warthog and termite mounds. In the Serengeti National Park, the activity levels of the honey badger was largely dependent on the time of year; in the dry season, it was mostly nocturnal, in contrast to the wet season, when it remained active throughout the day, reaching its zenith during crepuscular hours. In the Sariska Tiger Reserve in India, a study concluded that the honey badger was highly nocturnal. This finding was corroborated by another study in the Cauvery Wildlife Sanctuary. The honey badger is a skilled digger, able to dig tunnels into hard ground in 10 minutes. These burrows usually have only one entry, are usually only 1–3 m (3 ft 3 in – 9 ft 10 in) long with a nesting chamber that is not lined with any bedding.

Adults control a patch of land known as a home range. Females establish a large home range that changes in size depending foremost on the abundance of food, and particularly when rearing young, while males' considerably larger home ranges depend on the availability of females in heat; this often leads to males' home ranges intersecting with that of about 13 females. Adult males have an average home range of 548 km^{2} (212 sq mi), compared to females' average of 138 km^{2} (53 sq mi). It is suggested that adult males have a dominance hierarchy, and that females tend to avoid contact with each other, displaying less profound territorial behavior in spite of the 25% overlap in female home ranges. In the wild, honey badgers were confirmed to scent-mark while squatting, and it is suggested that this behaviour is an "important form of communication". They frequently scent-mark their territories with anal gland excretions, feces and urine. According to personal accounts, honey badgers in captivity were said to scent-mark in a squatting position, releasing fluid from their anal glands.

The honey badger is known for its strength, ferocity and toughness. It is known to savagely and fearlessly attack almost any other species when escape is impossible, reportedly even repelling much larger predators such as lion and hyena. In some instances, honey badgers deter large predators by unleashing a pungent yellow liquid from the anal glands. They accompany this with a threat display characterized by rattling noises, goosebumps, a straight, upward-facing tail, and charging while holding their head up high. In a 2018 study, it was found that the presence of large predators had no effect on the population of honey badgers in the Serengeti. This is likely indicative of the honey badger seeking areas comparable to those favoured by larger predators and perhaps even adopting a similar ecological niche. Bee stings, porcupine quills, and animal bites rarely penetrate their skin. If horses, cattle, or Cape buffalos intrude upon a honey badger's burrow, it will attack them. In the Cape Province, it is a potential prey species of the African leopard and Southern African rock python.

The voice of the honey badger is a hoarse "khrya-ya-ya-ya" sound. When mating, males emit loud grunting sounds. Cubs vocalise through plaintive whines, and when confronting dogs, honey badgers scream like bear cubs.

=== Diet ===
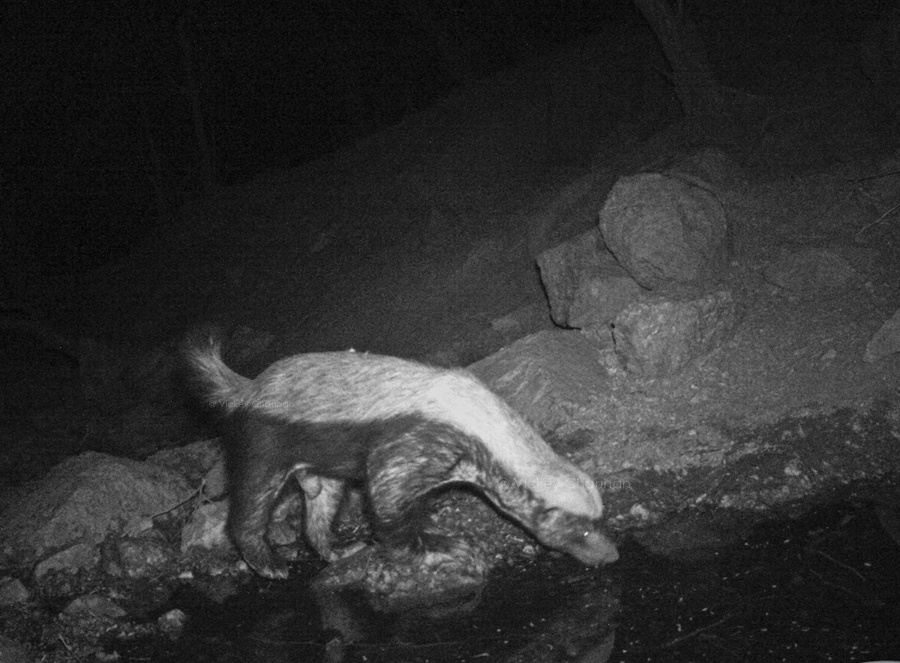
Honey badger in northern Gujarat

The honey badger has the least specialised diet of the weasel family next to the wolverine. It accesses a large part of its food by digging it out of burrows and feeds on insects, frogs, tortoises, turtles, lizards, rodents, snakes, birds and eggs. It also eats berries, roots and bulbs. It often raids beehives in search of both bee larvae and honey. It devours all parts of its prey, including skin, hair, feathers, flesh and bones, holding its food down with its forepaws. Some individuals have even been observed to chase away lion cubs from kills. Honey badgers studied in Kgalagadi Transfrontier Park preyed largely on geckos and skinks (47.9% of prey species), gerbils and mice (39.7% of prey), and were observed killing and eating black mambas and attacking domestic sheep and goats. The bulk of their prey comprised species weighing more than 100 g (3.5 oz) such as cobras, young Central African rock python and South African springhare; males and females caught similar-sized prey, despite their disparity in size. A honey badger was suspected to have broken up the shells of tent tortoises in the Nama Karoo. In India, honey badgers are said to dig up buried human corpses.

Despite common assumptions, there is no evidence that honeyguides guide the honey badger. A 2022 study in the southern Kalahari Desert revealed that black-backed jackals took food away from the honey badger, leading to a 5% decline in total food intake above ground. The honey badgers were preyed upon by larger predators such as spotted hyenas, leopards, and lions.

=== Reproduction ===
The honey badger does not have a specific mating period, and instead breeds at any time of the year. Females have an estimated oestrus period of about 14 days. Their gestation period is thought to last 50–70 days, usually resulting in one to two cubs born blind and hairless. Females give birth in a den and transport their young from one shelter to another for the first three months. When foraging, females abandon their cubs and return to suckle them in the den; sightings of females suckling young are generally rare. However, in one instance, a female suckling her young outside the den was observed laying in a supine position with her cub seated atop her abdomen in an upside-down orientation. At about three to five weeks of age, cubs begin developing the black-and-white coat, and at eight to twelve weeks, they follow their mother on foraging expeditions; weaning occurs during this period. On average, females will remain with their cubs for 1–1¼ years and during that time, they will teach cubs important life skills such as climbing, foraging and hunting. Not all cubs reach adulthood; in one study, the mortality rate of cubs in the Kgalagadi Transfrontier Park was 37%, and was caused by predation, infanticide and starvation. Although the exact age when males become sexually mature is uncertain, several factors indicate that they reach sexual maturity at two to three years of age. Also uncertain is when females reach sexual maturity, however, they are thought to be sexually mature on the onset of independency, with the largest indicator of this being the migration of females outside their mother's range not too long after the separation. The lifespan of the species in the wild is unknown, though captive individuals have been known to live for approximately 24 years.

=== Pathogens ===
Honey badgers are known to be susceptible to rabies. In one instance, a seemingly rabid honey badger attacked a dog and several people in separate attacks within the span of two days before being shot. The incident occurred in Kromdraai, South Africa in July 2021. An autopsy of the dead individual confirmed that the rabies arose from canines, both wild and domestic. Parasites that infect honey badgers include flatworms such as Strongyloides akbari, Uncinaria stenocephala, Artyfechinostomum sufrartyfex, Trichostrongylidae, Physaloptera, Ancylostoma, and Rictulariidae. There have also been cases of parasitic worm infections. Blood-sucking parasites known to infect this species include Haemaphysalis indica, Amblyomma javanensis and Rhipicephalus microplus. In addition, the honey badger has been recorded with feline parvovirus.

== Status ==
As of 2016, the honey badger is listed as least concern on the IUCN Red List due to its extensive range. It is mostly threatened by killings from beekeepers and farmers, sometimes with the use of poisons or traps, and is used in traditional medicine and as bushmeat. In other cases, control programs that were meant for other predators such as caracals have led to unintentional honey badger deaths. It is thought that many honey badger populations were eradicated as a result of poisoning alone.

=== Human–wildlife conflict ===
Honey badgers often become serious poultry predators. Because of their strength and persistence, they are difficult to deter. They are known to rip thick planks from henhouses or burrow underneath stone foundations. Surplus killing is common during these events, with one incident resulting in the death of 17 Muscovy ducks and 36 chickens. Because of the toughness and looseness of their skin, honey badgers are very difficult to hunt with dogs. Their skin is hard to penetrate, and its looseness allows them to twist and turn on their attackers when held. The only safe grip on a honey badger is on the back of the head; anywhere else, including the scruff of the neck, is highly dangerous. In Kenya, the honey badger is a major reservoir of rabies and is suspected to be a significant contributor to the sylvatic cycle of the disease.

== Conservation ==
The honey badger is protected in numerous range countries, such as Algeria, Morocco, Kazakhstan, Uzbekistan, and Turkmenistan. It also occurs in protected areas in many countries, such as the Kruger National Park in South Africa, and the Ustyurt Nature Reserve in Kazakhstan. In Ghana and Botswana, the populations are included under CITES Appendix III. The Indian population is protected under Schedule I of the Wildlife (Protection) Act, 1972.

=== In captivity ===
Honey badgers are kept in captivity as pets and to be exhibited in zoos. They are said to be easy to tame, with some reportedly ceasing the utilization of their anal glands. Despite this, when in contact with a handler, honey badgers often release anal gland secretions.

== In culture ==
The native people of Somalia believe that a man becomes infertile after being bitten by a honey badger, hence the wide berth they give to the species. In India, the honey badger has been alleged to dig up human corpses. During the British occupation of Basra Governorate in 2007, rumours of "man-eating badgers" emerged, including allegations that these beasts were released by the British troops, something that the British categorically denied. A British army spokesperson said that the badgers were "native to the region but rare in Iraq" and "are usually only dangerous to humans if provoked".

In popular media, the honey badger has garnered a reputation for being an intelligent, fearless animal with nicknames or titles given to it including "pound for pound, the most powerful creature in Africa", "most fearless animal in the world", "bravest animal in the world" and "meanest animal in the world". These names stem from the honey badger's ability to repel larger predators, which has been highlighted in such a way as to give the public audience the impression of invincibility. The noises made when performing the threat display are cited as another component of the honey badger's invincible image. Due to its ability of using tools, the honey badger is considered an intelligent creature and according to a BBC documentary titled Honey Badgers: Masters of Mayhem, captive individuals may work with others as a cohesive unit to help unlock gates or enclosures with the use of tools. The species' supposed fearless attitude is highlighted in the popular comic book Randall's Guide to Nastyass Animals: Honey Badger Don't Care. Reflecting this reputation, the honey badger has also been adopted as a symbol of Bitcoin, whose advocates liken the currency’s uncontrollability to the animal’s renowned toughness.

== Bibliography ==
- Ewer, R. F. (1973). The Carnivores. Cornell University Press. ISBN 978-0-8014-8493-3.
- Heptner, V. G.; Sludskii, A. A. (2002). Mammals of the Soviet Union. Vol. II, part 1b, Carnivores (Mustelidae). Washington, D.C.: Smithsonian Institution Libraries and National Science Foundation. ISBN 978-90-04-08876-4.
- Kingdon, J. (1989). East African mammals. Vol. 3: An atlas of evolution in Africa. Chicago: University of Chicago Press. ISBN 978-0-226-43721-7.
- Rosevear, D. R. (1974). The Carnivores of West Africa. London: British Museum (Natural History). ISBN 978-0-565-00723-2.
