= Burkhard Heim =

German physicist (1925–2001)

- Born: 9 February 1925; Potsdam, Germany
- Died: 14 January 2001 (aged 75); Northeim, Germany
- Known for: Heim theory
- Scientific career
- Fields: Physicist

Burkhard Heim (German: [haɪm]; 9 February 1925 – 14 January 2001) was a German theoretical physicist known for proposing a unified field theory called Heim theory, which he claimed could have applications to the development of hyperspace travel.

== Academic and work history ==
=== 1940s ===
In 1943, Heim met Werner Heisenberg, a German physicist involved in atom bomb research, and told him of his plan to use a form of chemical implosion to facilitate an atomic explosion. This design was based on an idea he developed for a 'clean' hydrogen bomb when he was 18. Heisenberg was impressed by Heim's knowledge, but thought the approach would be impractical.

At the start of World War II, Heim avoided conscription into the German Air Force by working in a chemical laboratory as an explosives technician. When he was 19, an explosion in the laboratory caused by the mishandling of unstable compounds left him without hands and mostly deaf and blind. Heim underwent the Krukenberg Procedure after the accident.

After World War II, Heim registered to study physics at the University of Göttingen.

=== 1950s ===
In 1952, during the third congressional session of the International Astronautical Federation (IAF) in Stuttgart, Germany, Heim presented his theory for interplanetary propulsion under the title of "Die dynamische Kontrabarie als Lösung des astronomischen Problems" (The Dynamic Kontrabarie as Solution of the Astronautical Problem). It was the first time the idea of gravitational, electromagnetic, weak, and strong forces were treated as distortions of their proper Euclidean metrics in a higher-dimensional space. A brief description of Heim's lecture was recorded in the proceedings of the Society for Space Research.

In 1954, he began to study under Carl Friedrich von Weizsäcker in Göttingen. He wrote his diploma thesis on physical processes in the Crab Nebula Supernova. Then, he began to work at the Max Planck Institute for Astrophysics in Göttingen. However, he soon found it extremely difficult to work in a team due to his disabilities.

In 1955, Heim was contracted by the Glenn L. Martin Company to assist them with a gravity control propulsion project. The news about Heim's contract was published during a period of increasing United States gravity control propulsion research (1955 - 1974).

In 1956, Heim completed a 27-page progress report that summarized his philosophy (syntrometry) and his theory (Principle of Dynamic Kontrabarie) for coupling general relativity with quantum dynamics for propulsion applications. Sample calculations for an expedition from the surface of the Earth to the surface of the planet Mars appeared at the end of Heim's progress report.

In November 1957, Heim delivered a lecture about his propulsion theory to the German Society for Rocket Technology and Space Travel in Frankfurt. Subsequently, Wernher von Braun sought his comments on various aerospace projects. According to von Ludwiger, a German author known for his publication on UFOs, an audiotape of Heim's presentation had been prepared for shipment to America.

In 1959, Heim completed his first publication in the German journal Zeitschrift für Flugkörper (Magazine for Missiles). Heim discussed "the principle of the dynamic "Kontrabarie," examining how a field drive would be more effective than the best chemical drive for rockets." These papers remained ambiguous on the fundamental concepts underlying his theory of the field drive, likely the calculations on the extra fields of his field theory remained unsolved. These calculations were only performed a few years later.

Heim stopped working on the propulsion aspect of his theory in 1959. He spent the remainder of his life devoted to refining the unified field attributes of his theory.

=== 1960s ===
In the late 1950s and early 1960s, there were a number of reports on Heim in magazines and tabloids such as Le Figaro, Bunte Illustrierte, Quick and Stern. The magazine le Figaro remarked, on 15 January 1969, that he was an "inhuman robot". The German television station ARD ran reports and interviews with Heim. It was speculated that Heim was likely to make a breakthrough, either in fundamental physics or propulsion theory.

On 17 November 1969, Heim reported the progress he had made towards developing his unified field theory to Messerschmitt-Bölkow-Blohm (MBB). Pascual Jordan and Gebhard Lyra were among the small body of scientists who attended that colloquium. Jordan wrote Heim a letter on 22 December 1969, encouraging him to publish his theory.

=== 1970s ===
Ludwig Bölkow encouraged Heim to enhance his theory. On 25 November 1976, Heim publicly introduced, for the first time, his completed unified field theory in a presentation to MBB engineers. It included the methodology for calculating the mass spectrum of elementary particles. Pursuant to recommendations by Werner Heisenberg's successor, Hans-Peter Dürr, Heim published his unified field theory summary the following year in an article entitled "Recommendations of a Way to a Unified Description of Elementary Particles" in the Max Planck Institute journal Zeitschrift für Naturforschung (Journal of Natural Research). This was the first publication of his theory in a peer-reviewed scientific journal.

=== 1980s ===
In 1982, Heim's mass formula was programmed on a computer at the German Electron Synchrotron DESY in Hamburg with the assistance of some resident scientists. Up to that point, Heim had not yet confided in other theoretical physicists on the details of the mass formula derivation. Hence, the DESY results were not widely published and disseminated for academic scrutiny. That year Walter Dröscher, a theorist at the Vienna Patent Office, began to work with Heim. The first result of their collaboration culminated in the second volume of Heim's major work, appearing in 1984.

=== 2000s ===
Heim died in Northeim in 2001 at age 75.

In 2004, the American Institute of Aeronautics and Astronautics (AIAA) awarded the winning paper in the nuclear and future flight field to a retired Austrian patent officer named Walter Dröscher and Jochem Häuser, a physicist and professor of computer science at the University of Applied Sciences in Salzgitter, Germany. They turned the theoretical framework of Burkhard Heim into a proposal for an experimental test for a propulsion device that is thought to theoretically be able to travel at rates faster than the speed of light. Hans Theodor Auerbach, a theoretical physicist and colleague of Heim has stated that, "As far as I understand it, Heim theory is ingenious," and, "I think that physics will take this direction in the future".

In 2008, the AIAA Nuclear and Future Flight Propulsion Technical Committee published the following statement:

Much research was conducted this year on the investigation of the experimental basis of the existence of gravity-like fields that cannot be described by conventional gravitation; that is, by the accumulation of mass. Investigations emphasized a geometrized approach termed Extended Heim Theory, which extends Einstein's idea of geometrization of physics by employing the additional concepts of Heim.

== Life and health ==
Heim had to undergo a series of at least 50 operations after a laboratory explosion that resulted in the loss of both of his hands. He had found that intense concentration on the study of Einstein's relativity theory had helped him control the pain in his arms mentally and physically.

The loss of his hands and serious reduction of his eyesight apparently resulted in Heim acquiring an eidetic, acoustic memory. He was said to rarely forget a formula if he heard it recited, and he was said to be able to learn a language in a matter of days. He married a former concert singer from Prague in 1950 named Gerda.

== Heim theory ==
Heim theory was proposed by Heim in 1957 as an attempt to develop a theory of everything in theoretical physics. The theory claims to bridge some of the disagreements between quantum mechanics and general relativity. The theory has received little attention in the scientific literature and is regarded as being outside mainstream science but has attracted some interest in popular and fringe media. Heim attempted to resolve incompatibilities between quantum theory and general relativity. To meet that goal, he developed a mathematical approach based on quantizing spacetime.

Heim's theory also predicts the existence of two hypothetical neutrinos, which have been shown not to exist by experiments at the Large Electron–Positron Collider.
