= Schwaiger =

Schwaiger is a surname. Notable people with the surname include:

- Brigitte Schwaiger (1949–2010), Austrian author
- Dominik Schwaiger (born 1991), German alpine ski racer
- Doris Schwaiger (born 1985), Austrian beach volleyball player
- Franz Schwaiger (1918-1944), German fighter pilot
- Hanuš Schwaiger (1854–1912), Czech painter
- Imre Schwaiger (1868–1940), Hungarian art collector and dealer in British India
- Julia Schwaiger (born 1996), Austrian biathlete
- Peppi Schwaiger (1930–2014), German alpine skier
- Rosl Schwaiger (1918–1970), Austrian operatic coloratura soprano
- Stefanie Schwaiger (born 1986), Austrian beach volleyball player

== See also ==
- Schwaigern, a town in the district of Heilbronn, Baden-Württemberg, Germany
- Schweiger, a surname
