= Franz Schweigger-Seidel =

German physiologist

Franz Schweigger-Seidel (September 24, 1834 – August 23, 1871) was a German physiologist born in Halle an der Saale. He was the son of chemist Franz Wilhelm Schweigger-Seidel (1795-1838).

In 1858 he obtained his doctorate from the University of Halle with a dissertation titled Disquisitiones de callo. Afterwards he served as an assistant to Rudolf Heidenhain (1834-1897) at the physiological institute in Breslau, and from 1865 was an assistant to Carl Ludwig (1816-1895) at the University of Leipzig. In 1866 he received his habilitation, and during the following year became an associate professor at Leipzig.

His name is associated with "Schweigger-Seidel sheaths", which are spindle-shaped sleeves that cover penicillar arterioles of the spleen.

== Selected writings ==
- Über den Übergang körperlicher Bestandteile aus dem Blute in die Lymphgefäße, Leipzig (1861)
- Die Nieren des Menschen und der Säugetiere in ihrem feineren Bau, Halle (1865)
- Über das Centrum tendineum des Zwerchfelles. Arbeiten aus der Physiologischen Anstalt zu Leipzig, with Carl Ludwig (1866)
- Einige Bemerkungen über die rothen Blutkörperchen. Arbeiten aus der Physiologischen Anstalt zu Leipzig, with Alexander Schmidt (1867)
- Die Lymphgefässe der Fascien und Sehnen. Leipzig, with Carl Ludwig (1872)
