= Schweigger-Seidel sheath =

Spleen's sheathed arteriole's phagocytic sleeve

Schweigger-Seidel sheath is a phagocytic sleeve that is part of a sheathed arteriole of the spleen, and is sometimes referred to as a splenic ellipsoid. It is a spindle-shaped thickening in the walls of the second part of the arterial branches forming the penicilli in the spleen. It is named after German physiologist Franz Schweigger-Seidel (1834-1871).
