= Johann Schweigger =

German chemist and physicist (1779–1857)

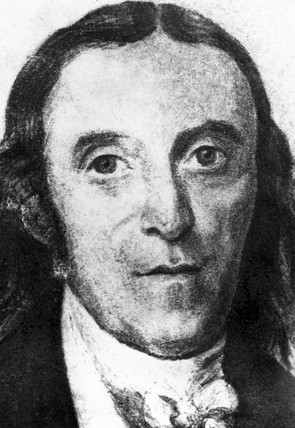
- Born: Johann Salomo Christoph Schweigger; 8 April 1779; Erlangen, Brandenburg-Bayreuth
- Died: 6 September 1857 (aged 78); Halle, Prussian Saxony
- Education: University of Erlangen-Nuremberg
- Known for: First galvanometer
- Scientific career
- Fields: Physics, chemistry, mathematics
- Workplaces: Bayreuth Gymnasium; University of Erlangen-Nuremberg; University of Halle-Wittenberg
- Doctoral advisor: Gottlieb Christoph Harless
- Other academic advisors: Georg Friedrich Hildebrandt; Karl Christian von Langsdorf; Johann Tobias Mayer
- Doctoral students: Wilhelm Eduard Weber
- Other notable students: Franz Wilhelm Schweigger-Seidel

Johann Salomo Christoph Schweigger (8 April 1779 – 6 September 1857) was a German chemist, physicist, and professor of mathematics born in Erlangen.

J.S.C.Schweigger was the son of Friedrich Christian Lorenz Schweigger, professor of theologie in Erlangen (1786 until his death in 1802). He studied philosophy in Erlangen. His PhD involved the Homeric Question revived at that time by Friedrich August Wolf. Johann Tobias Mayer, Georg Friedrich Hildebrandt and Karl Christian von Langsdorf convinced him to switch to physics and chemistry and he lectured on this subjects in Erlangen until 1803 before taking a position as schoolteacher in Bayreuth and in 1811 in Nuremberg. During 1816-1819 he was appointed professor of philosophy in Erlangen teaching physics and chemistry. 1816 he was elected member of the Leopoldina. 1819 he moved on to the university of Halle.

In 1820 he built the first sensitive galvanometer, naming it after Luigi Galvani. He created this instrument, acceptable for actual measurement as well as detection of small amounts of electric current, by wrapping a coil of wire around a graduated compass. The instrument was initially called a multiplier.

He is the father of Karl Ernst Theodor Schweigger and adopted one of his students Franz Wilhelm Schweigger-Seidel as his own son.

== Written works ==
- Einleitung in die Mythologie auf dem Standpunkte der Naturwissenschaft, Halle (1836) - Introduction to mythology, from the standpoint of natural science.
- Über naturwissenschaftliche Mysterien in ihrem Verhältnis zur Litteratur des Altertums, Halle (1843) - Involving scientific mysteries in their relation to the literature of antiquity.
- Über das Elektron der Alten, Greifswald (1848) - On the electron of the past.
- Über die stöchiometrischen Reihen, Halle (1853) - On the stoichiometry series.
