= Gottlieb Conrad Christian Storr =

German physician, chemist and naturalist

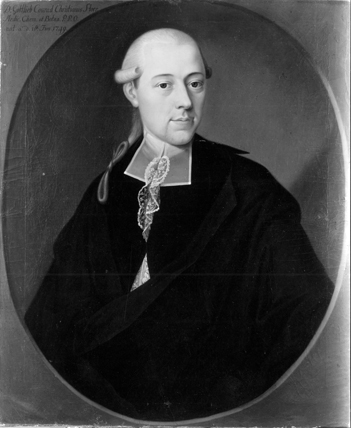
- Born: 16 June 1749; Stuttgart
- Died: 27 February 1821 (aged 71); Tübingen
- Education: University of Tübingen
- Known for: Taxonomic authority of several genera, including Mellivora
- Scientific career
- Fields: Physician, chemist, naturalist
- Institutions: University of Tübingen
- Author abbrev. (zoology): Storr

Gottlieb Conrad Christian Storr (16 June 1749, Stuttgart – 27 February 1821, Tübingen) was a German physician, chemist, and naturalist. He was the younger brother of theologian Gottlob Christian Storr (1746–1805).

In 1768 he obtained his doctorate from the University of Tübingen, where he also served as a professor of chemistry, botany, and natural history from 1774 to 1801. He is the taxonomic authority of several genera, including Mellivora, whose only species is the honey badger (Mellivora capensis).

== Published works ==
In 1781 he performed extensive scientific investigations in the Swiss Alps, publishing "Alpenreise vom Jahre 1781" (1784–86, 2 vols.) as a result. Other noted written efforts by Storr include:

- "Dissertatio inauguralis medica, de curis viperinis", 1768 (with Ferdinand Christoph Oetinger).
- Entwurf einer Folge von Unterhaltungen zur Einleitung in die Naturgeschichte, 1777.
- Ueber seine Bearbeitungsart der Naturgeschichte, 1780.
- "Investigandae crystallifodinarum oeconomiae quaedam pericula", 1785.
- "Idea methodi fossilium", 1807.
