= Krukenberg tumor =

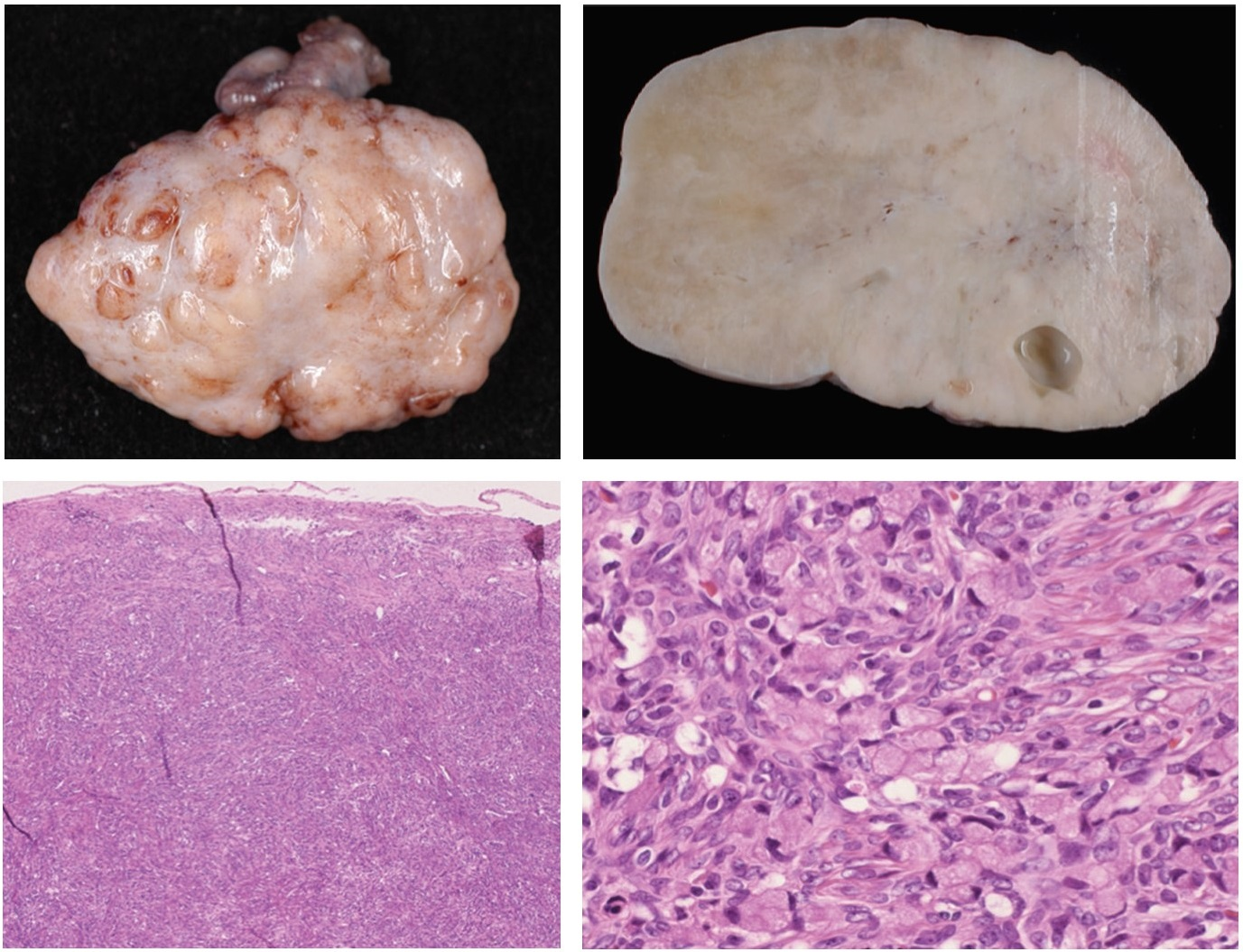
- Signet ring cell carcinoma metastasis to the ovary, also called Krukenberg tumor: Gross pathology (top, cross-section at right) and histopathology at low and high magnification. The latter shows invasive proliferation of signet-ring cells with a desmoplastic stroma.
- Specialty: Oncology

A Krukenberg tumor refers to a malignancy in the ovary that metastasized from a primary site, classically the gastrointestinal tract, although it can arise in other tissues such as the breast. Gastric adenocarcinoma, especially at the pylorus, is the most common source. Krukenberg tumors are often (over 80%) found in both ovaries, consistent with its metastatic nature.

== Signs and symptoms ==
Krukenberg tumors often come to the attention when they cause abdominal or pelvic pain, bloating, ascites, or pain during sexual intercourse. Krukenberg tumors can occasionally provoke a reaction of the ovarian stroma which leads to hormone production, that results in vaginal bleeding, a change in menstrual habits, or hirsutism, or occasionally virilization as a main symptom. In rare cases the disease can manifest with hydronephrosis and hydroureter.

All these symptoms are non-specific and can also arise with a range of problems other than cancer, and a diagnosis can only be made following confirmatory investigations such as computed tomography (CT) scans, laparotomy and/or a biopsy of the ovary.

== Cause and incidence ==
Krukenberg tumors can be seen in all age groups, with an average age of 45 years. In most countries, cancer that has metastasized to the ovary accounts for only about 1 to 2% of ovarian cancer; in the remainder, the ovary itself is the primary cancer site. However, in Japan they represent a much higher percentage of malignancies in the ovary (almost 20%) due to the increased prevalence of gastric cancer.

Krukenberg tumors account for about 15% of metastatic cancers that initially appear to have arisen in the ovary, and as such is less common than metastasis arising from ovarian epithelial and germ-cell tumors.

In people who have had nongynecologic malignancy, approximately 20% of adnexal masses are malignant, and 60% of these are Krukenberg tumors.

== Pathogenesis ==
There has been debate over the exact mechanism of metastasis of the tumor cells from the stomach, appendix or colon to the ovaries. Classically it was thought that direct seeding across the abdominal cavity accounted for the spread of this tumor, but spread by way of the lymphatic is considered more likely. Retrograde lymphatics are thought to be more important in the pathogenesis of Krukenberg tumour, since the ovaries in Krukenberg tumour do not show capsular invasion or a breach of the epithelium lining the surface. The average age of diagnosis of Krukenberg tumors may partly relate to the relatively increased vascularity of the ovaries.

Microscopically, Krukenberg tumors are often characterized by mucin-secreting signet-ring cells in the tissue of the ovary; when the primary tumor is discovered, the same signet-ring cells are typically found. However, other microscopic features can predominate. Krukenberg tumors are most commonly metastases from gastric cancer, particularly adenocarcinoma, or breast cancer particularly invasive lobular breast carcinoma, but they can arise in the appendix, colon, small intestine, rectum, gallbladder, and urinary bladder or gallbladder, biliary tract, pancreas, ampulla of Vater or uterine cervix.

Immunohistochemistry may help in diagnosing Krukenberg tumors from primary ovarian neoplasms but needs to be applied with discretion. For example, tumors that are immunoreactive to CEA or cytokeratin 20 (CK20) and negative for cytokeratin 7 (CK7) may be more likely to be of colorectal origin.

== Treatment and prognosis ==
Since Krukenberg tumors are secondary (metastatic), management might logically be driven by identifying and treating the primary cancer. The optimal treatment of Krukenberg tumors is unclear. The role of surgical resection has not been adequately addressed but if metastasis is limited to the ovaries, surgery may improve survival. The role of chemotherapy and/or radiotherapy is uncertain but may sometimes be beneficial.

== History ==
Krukenberg tumors are named after Friedrich Ernst Krukenberg (1871–1946), who reported what he thought was a new type of primary ovarian malignancy in 1896; six years later these were shown to be of metastatic gastrointestinal tract origin. However, Paget had described the process in 1854.
