= Karl Ernst Theodor Schweigger =

German ophthalmologist (1830–1905)

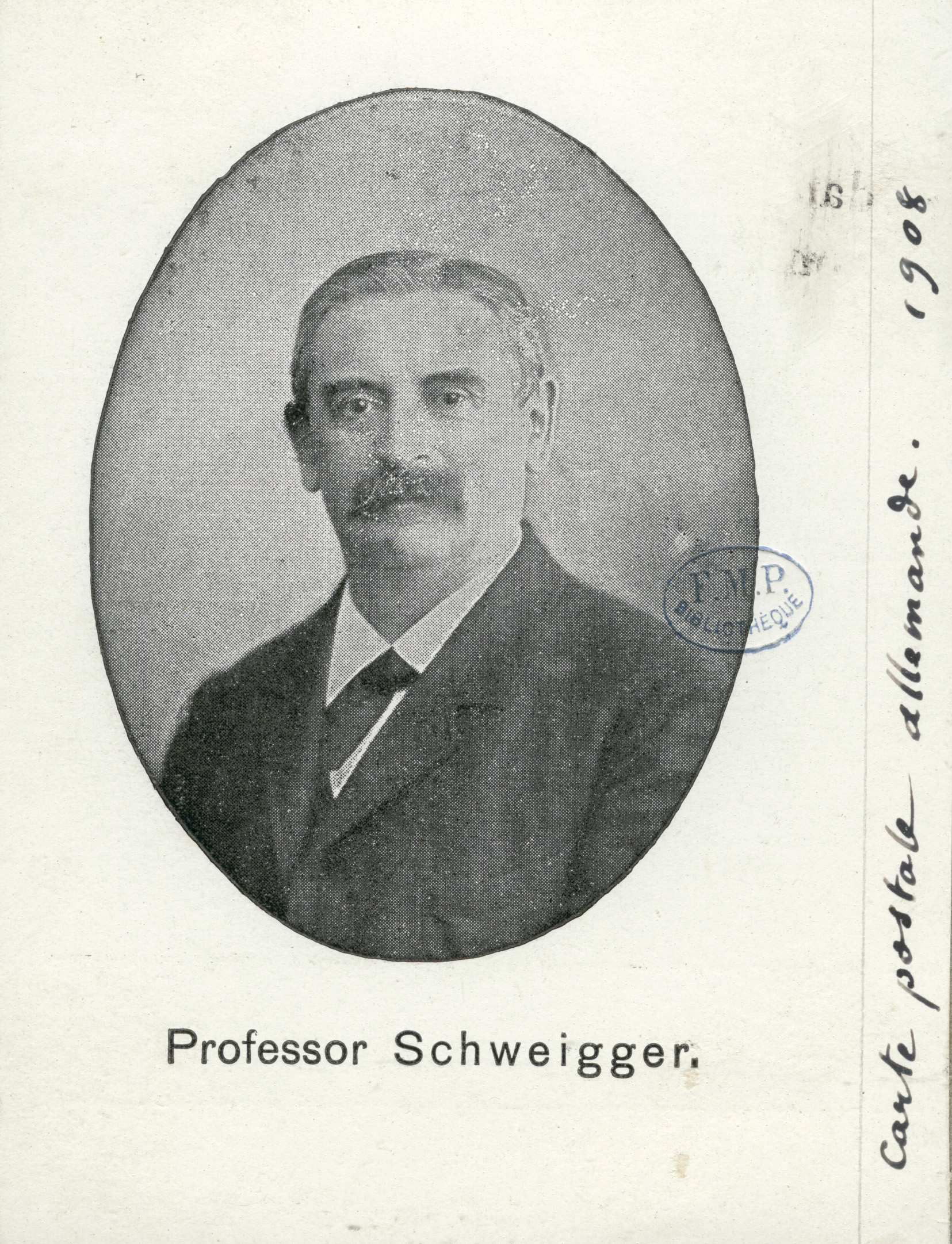
Karl Ernst Theodor Schweigger

Karl Ernst Theodor Schweigger (28 October 1830 – 24 August 1905) was a German ophthalmologist who was a native of Halle an der Saale. He was the son of scientist Johann Salomo Christoph Schweigger (1779–1857), inventor of an early galvanometer.

He studied medicine in Erlangen and Halle, earning his doctorate in 1852. Subsequently, he became a medical assistant to Peter Krukenberg (1788–1865) at the University of Halle, and from 1856 worked under anatomist Heinrich Müller (1820–1864) at the University of Würzburg. In Würzburg he learned microscopic pathology and anatomy of the eye, thus developing an interest in ophthalmology. Later he moved to Berlin, where he spent six years as an assistant to Albrecht von Graefe (1828–1870).

In 1868 he was appointed professor of ophthalmology at the University of Göttingen, and in 1871 succeeded Albrecht von Graefe as chair of ophthalmology at the Charité-Berlin, a position he would hold for 28 years.

He is remembered for his work involving microscopic pathology of the eye. He also made contributions in his research of strabismus and glaucoma. Beginning in 1882 he was co-editor of Hermann Knapp's Archiv für Augenheilkunde. He was author of a textbook on ophthalmology called Handbuch der speciellen Augenheilkunde that was later translated into English as Handbook of ophthalmology (1878, from the 3rd German edition). He also published an influential book on ophthalmoscopy titled Vorlesungen über den Gebrauch des Augenspiegels (1864).

Schweigger died in Berlin.

== Associated eponym ==
- "Schweigger's perimeter": Handheld instrument used to measure the extent of a visual field
