= Franz Wilhelm Schweigger-Seidel =

German physician and chemist (1795–1838)

Franz Wilhelm Schweigger-Seidel (16 October 1795 – 5 June 1838); born as Franz Wilhelm Seidel was a German medical doctor and chemist born in Weißenfels. He was the father of physiologist Franz Schweigger-Seidel (1834–1871).

Trained as a pharmacist, in 1820 he began his studies of medicine and sciences in Halle, where in two years he was an assistant in the laboratory for chemistry. Here he worked closely with Johann Salomo Christoph Schweigger (1779–1857), who would become Seidel's legally adoptive father. Subsequently, Seidel changed his surname to "Schweigger-Seidel" as a tribute to his adoptive father's brother, naturalist August Friedrich Schweigger (1783–1821), who was murdered in Sicily on 28 June 1821.

In 1824 he earned his degree at Halle, and spent the next few years as a physician in Berlin. In 1827 he became a professor at the University of Halle, where in 1829 he founded the pharmaceutical institute and served as its director. His scientific work was mainly in the fields of physiological and pathological chemistry.

Schweigger-Seidel died on 5 June 1838 by drowning in the river Saale.
