= Carl Friedrich Wilhelm Krukenberg =

German comparative anatomist and physiologist

Carl Friedrich Wilhelm Krukenberg (May 27, 1852 – February 18, 1889) was a German comparative anatomist and physiologist. His studies on biochemistry and physiology in animals were pioneering in approach. Among his major contributions was studies on animal colour pigments.

Krukenberg was born in Königslutter to pharmacist Friedrich Julius Krukenberg (1815–1861) and Marie Louise Auguste (1825–1861) née Grundner. He was educated at St. Martini Pharmacy in Braunschweig in 1873 after which he studied physiological chemistry at Kaiser Wilhelm University in Strasbourg and the Ruprecht Karl University in Heidelberg and became an assistant to Wilhelm Kühne in Heidelberg. After receiving his doctorate he worked with Adolf Fick in Würzburg. He moved to the University of Jena in 1884.

Krukenberg examined biological pigments such as hemerythrin, lipochromes, and the colours of eggs (being the first to identify biliverdin as a pigment) and feathers. He also looked at structural chemicals such as muscles and sericin in silk. Other studies included the nerve physiology of echinoderms.
