= Schwager =

Schwager (meaning 'brother in law' in German) is a surname. Notable people with the surname include:

- Brian Schwager, American musician
- Dietmar Schwager (1940–2018), German footballer and manager
- Dominik Schwager (born 1976), German auto racing driver
- Irma Schwager (1920–2015), Austrian World War II resistance fighter and politician
- Jack D. Schwager (born 1948), American author and investment manager
- Patricia Schwager (born 1983), Swiss racing cyclist
- Raymund Schwager (1935–2004), Swiss Roman Catholic theologian
- Reg Schwager (born 1962), Dutch-Canadian jazz guitarist and composer
- Yisha'ayahu Schwager (1946–2000), Israeli footballer
