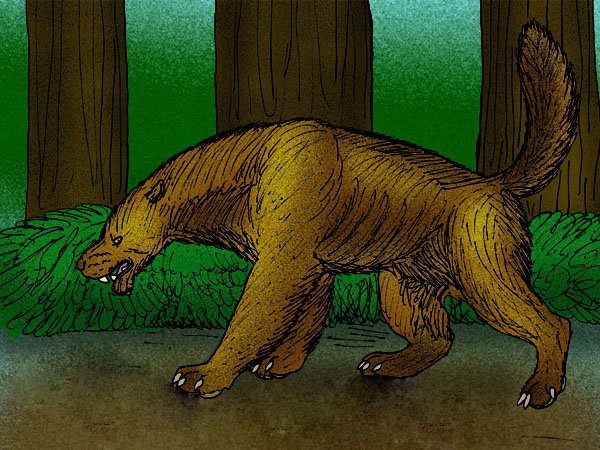
- Ekorus ekakeran

Scientific classification
- Kingdom: Animalia
- Phylum: Chordata
- Class: Mammalia
- Order: Carnivora
- Family: Mustelidae
- Genus: †Ekorus; Werdelin, 2003
- Species: †E. ekakeran

Binomial name
- †Ekorus ekakeran Werdelin, 2003

= Ekorus =

Ekorus Temporal range: Late Miocene, 6 Ma

Extinct species of carnivoran

Ekorus ekakeran is a large, extinct mustelid mammal. Fossils, including largely complete skeletons, are known from the late Miocene of Kenya.

== Description ==
Ekorus reached almost 44 kg (97 lb), comparably to a wolf and much bigger than the modern honey badger (Mellivora capensis). Standing 60 cm (2.0 ft) tall at the shoulders, its build was not similar to that of modern mustelids. Small, modern-day weasels have short legs and can only achieve short bursts of speed. Living large mustelids are either aquatic predators (the otters, Lutrinae), or terrestrial animals with a crouching stance and heavy limbs with adaptations for digging (the wolverine, and various groups called badgers). Ekorus is a representative of an extinct ecological type of mustelid – large stalking and running mammals comparable to dogs, cats, hyenas, and amphicyonids. The legs of Ekorus are built like those of leopards. The face is short, with a felid-like tooth pattern; Ekorus was a hypercarnivore. Analysis of the elbow indicates that it was a strong runner, like modern hyenas and dogs, and did not grapple with its paws, as bears and raccoons do. The legs are long; the feet are short and stout.

Fossils of giant Miocene mustelids with similar morphology, reconstructed as hypercarnivores or carnivore-scavengers, have also been discovered in North America, Europe, and Asia, as well as other parts of Africa.

== Paleoecology ==
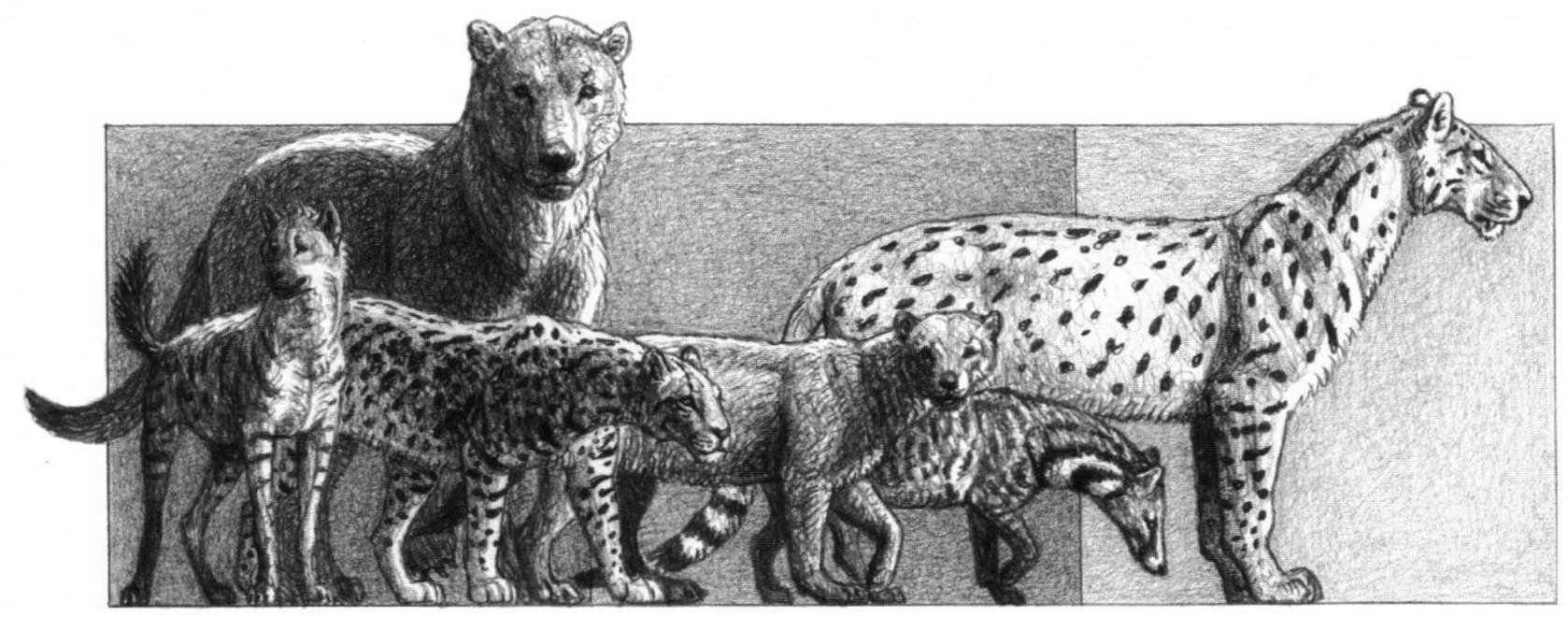
Life restoration of Ekorus (middle) and other Late Miocene African carnivorans

Apparently before the African savannas evolved, the giant mustelid Ekorus stalked its prey, such as the three-toed horse Eurygnathohippus and the large pig Nyanzachoerus, in forests and woodlands.

In the early Cenozoic, Africa was isolated from Eurasia, where modern African groups such as cats and giraffes first evolved. African predators and prey developed along their own lines to hunt in closed environments. Ekorus had the upright stance typical of active hunters, lacked digging adaptations, and was leopard-sized, with leopard-like body proportions. Since leopards are ambush hunters in forests and woodlands, Ekorus may have filled a parallel role in the Miocene forests of Africa. Other research has suggested the genus was cursorial, chasing down prey more like a modern wolf or spotted hyena. In general, Miocene predators show larger body sizes with anatomies between the modern "dog-like" pursuit running and "cat-like" stalk-pounce-and-grapple strategies. This was suggested to be the result of the great abundance of prey species in Miocene forests, which allowed predators to survive without having to specialize as either fast runners or grapplers.

== Extinction ==
Tectonic changes starting about 35 million years ago led to the formation of the Great Rift Valley, and the rise of highlands that cause rain shadows in the surrounding region. Before the rift opened, Kenya was more forested. Grasslands began to spread across Africa in the mid-Miocene, slowly replacing closed forest environments with open savannas. Any or all of these factors may have led to the extinction of Ekorus and other large mustelid hunters.
