= Friedrich Ernst Krukenberg =

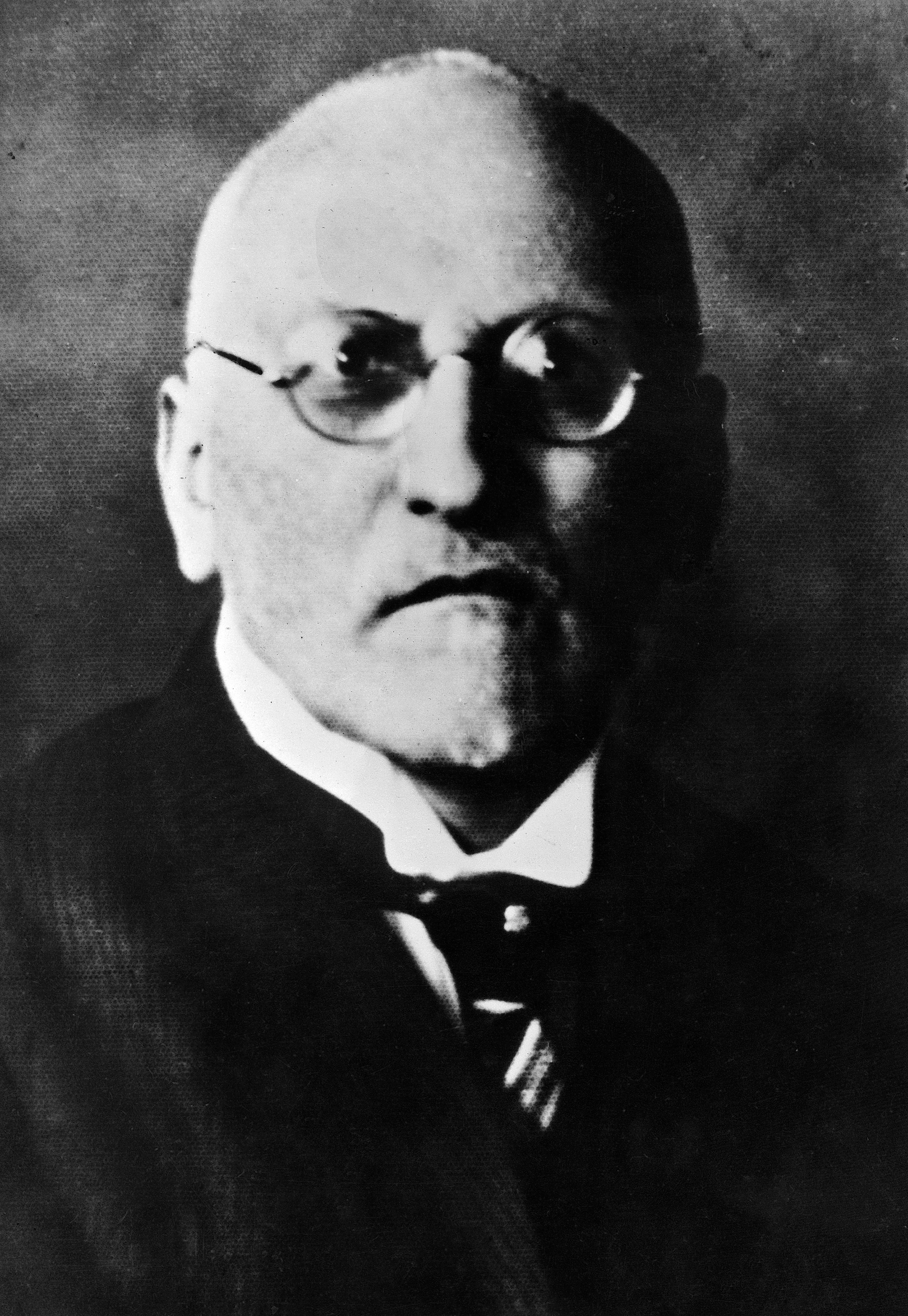

Friedrich Ernst Krukenberg (1 April 1871 – 20 February 1946) was a German physician who was a native of Halle an der Saale. He was a brother to orthopedic surgeon Hermann Krukenberg (1863–1935) and Georg Heinrich Peter Krukenberg (1856–1899), who was a professor of gynecology at the University of Bonn.

Krukenberg originally studied in his native city of Halle, and continued his medical education at the University of Marburg, where he was a student of ophthalmologist Theodor Axenfeld (1867–1930). At Marburg he also studied under pathologist Felix Jacob Marchand (1846–1928), in whose department he described a fibrosarcoma of the ovary that was to become known as a Krukenberg tumor. In 1896 he published his findings in an article called Über das Fibrosarcoma ovarii mucocellulare (carcinomatodes).

Later, his interest turned to ophthalmology, and eventually he returned to Halle where he opened a private practice. The ophthalmic term "Krukenberg's spindle" is named after him, which is a vertical, fusiform deposition of melanin pigmentation in the deep layers of the cornea.

Krukenberg was an avid skier throughout his life. In a late life interview, Krukenberg reflected fondly on frequent weekend trips to Fallbachhang Oberhof with his father; A ski resort two hours south-west of his home town of Halle (Saale), Germany.

Following retirement in 1928, Krukenberg moved to Lake Geneva, Switzerland with his wife and teenage daughters to pursue his retirement dream of skiing in the Swiss Alps. Krukenberg skied primarily at Les Portes du Soleil resort, a major skisports destination to this day.

Krukenberg befriended Gustav Lantschner, a future silver medalist at the 1936 Winter Olympics, and began training together in 1933. The 1936 Winter Olympics was the first time Alpine skiing was arranged in the Olympics.
