= Hermann Krukenberg =

German surgeon

Hermann Krukenberg (21 June 1863 – 3 October 1935) was a German surgeon who was a native of Calbe, Province of Saxony, Kingdom of Prussia. He was the brother of pathologist Friedrich Ernst Krukenberg (1871–1946).

Krukenberg studied medicine at the Universities of Bonn, Strassburg and Heidelberg. Afterwards he was a surgical assistant to Friedrich Trendelenburg (1844–1924) in Bonn, and to Max Schede (1844–1902) at Eppendorf Hospital in Hamburg. In 1892 he became manager of a private clinic in Halle an der Saale, and in 1899 was chief surgeon at the municipal hospital in Liegnitz. During World War I he served as a field surgeon.

In 1917 he developed an operation known today as the "Krukenberg procedure". This procedure involves separation of the ulna and radius bones in order to convert a below-elbow amputation stump into a "sensory forceps" that receives its strength from the pronator teres muscle. Among his written works was a 1913 book on physiognomy titled Gesichtsausdruck des Menschen.
