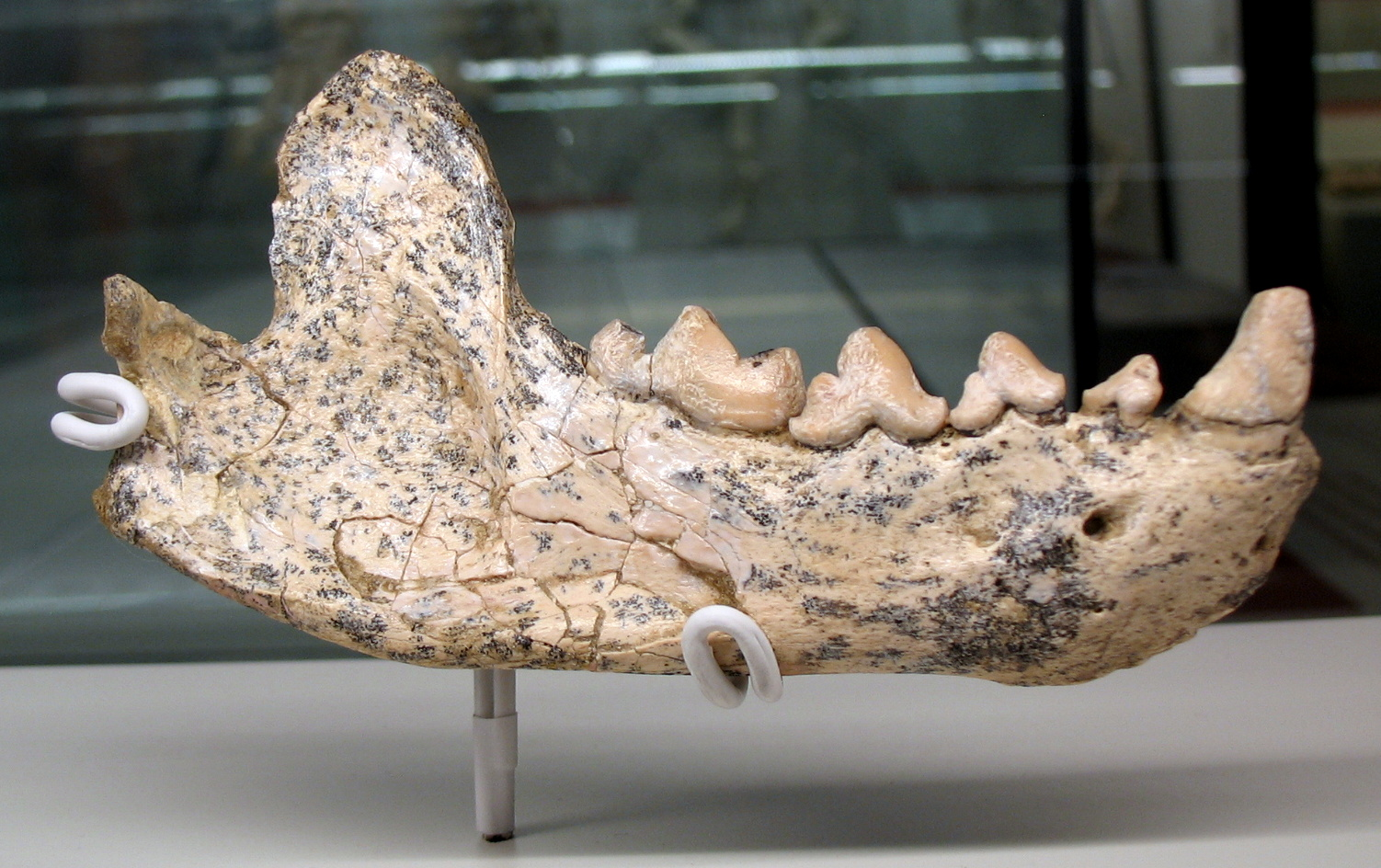
- Eomellivora piveteaui mandible

Scientific classification
- Kingdom: Animalia
- Phylum: Chordata
- Class: Mammalia
- Infraclass: Placentalia
- Order: Carnivora
- Suborder: Caniformia
- Family: Mustelidae
- Genus: †Eomellivora; Zdansky, 1924

Type species
- †Eomellivora wimani Zdansky, 1924

Other species
- Eomellivora fricki (Pia, 1939); Eomellivora hungarica Kretzoi, 1942; Eomellivora ursogulo (Orlov, 1947); Eomellivora piveteaui Ozansoy, 1965; Eomellivora? tugenensis Morales & Pickford, 2005

Synonyms
- Hadrictis fricki Pia, 1939; Perunium ursogulo Orlov, 1947

= Eomellivora =

Eomellivora Temporal range: Miocene, 11–5 Ma

Extinct genus of carnivores

Eomellivora is an extinct genus of prehistoric mustelids, closely related to the honey badger, known from Eurasia and North America, and tentatively Africa. It was one of the biggest mustelids ever known, bigger and more hypercarnivorous than the modern wolverine. Using equations by Legendre (1986) for calculating body mass for mammals through linear dimensions of the first lower molar, Eomellivora averaged roughly 50 kg (based on measurements reported in Valenciano et al., 2015).

== Taxonomy ==
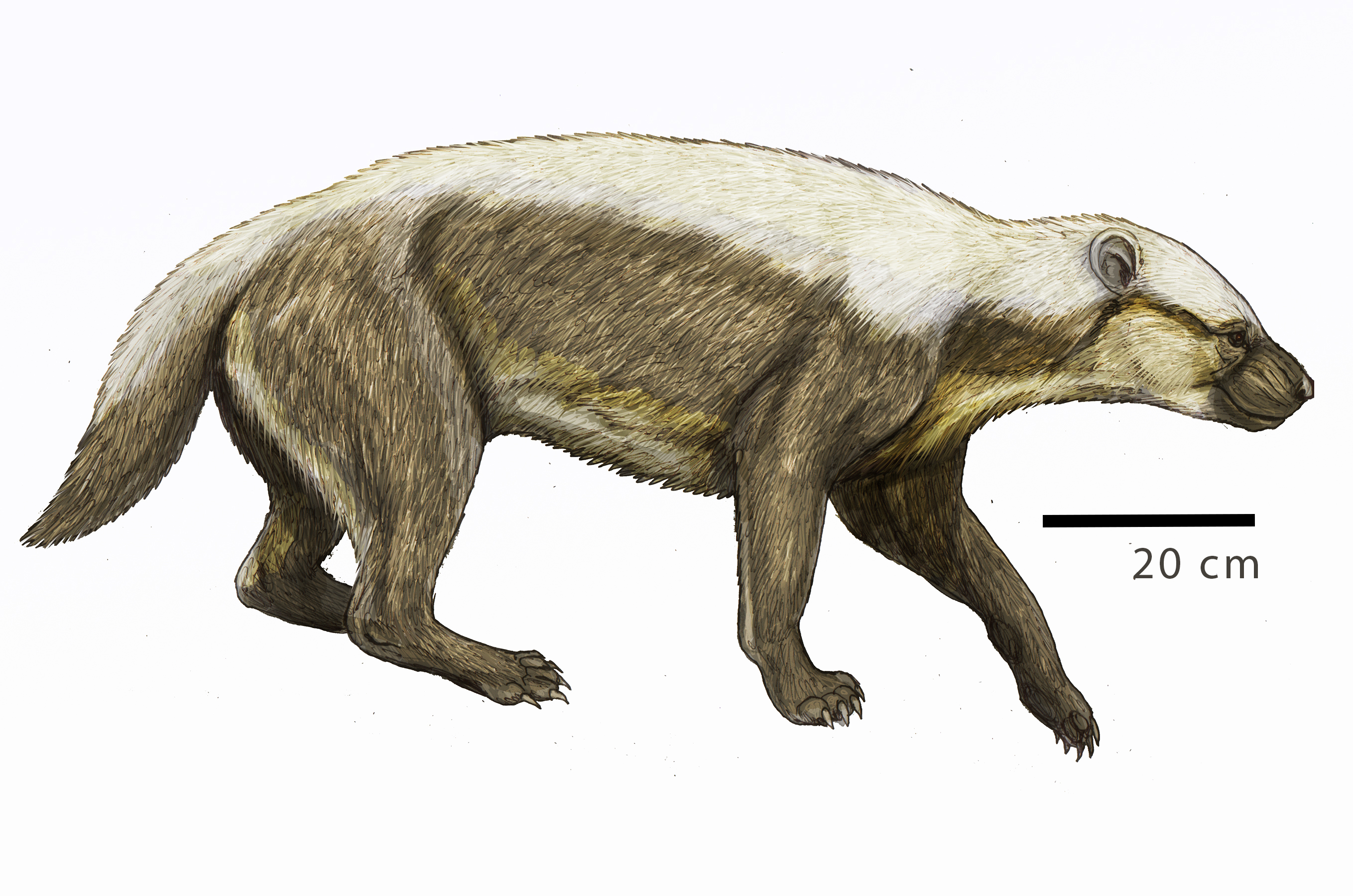
Life restoration

Eomellivora was long thought to contain only one species, E. wimani, with Wolsan and Semenov (1996) treating E. piveteaui as a younger subspecies of E. wimani, but new remains of E. piveteaui described in 2015 allowed for recognition of E. piveteaui as distinct from E. wimani, but also treatment of E. ursogulo (Orlov, 1948) and E. hungarica Kretzoi, 1942 from the eastern Paratethys region. The placement of the African species Eomellivora tugenensis in Eomellivora is tentative. The genus Hadrictis Pia, 1939, described from a skull found in Late Miocene deposits in Austria, is a junior synonym of Eomellivora.

== Palaeoecology ==
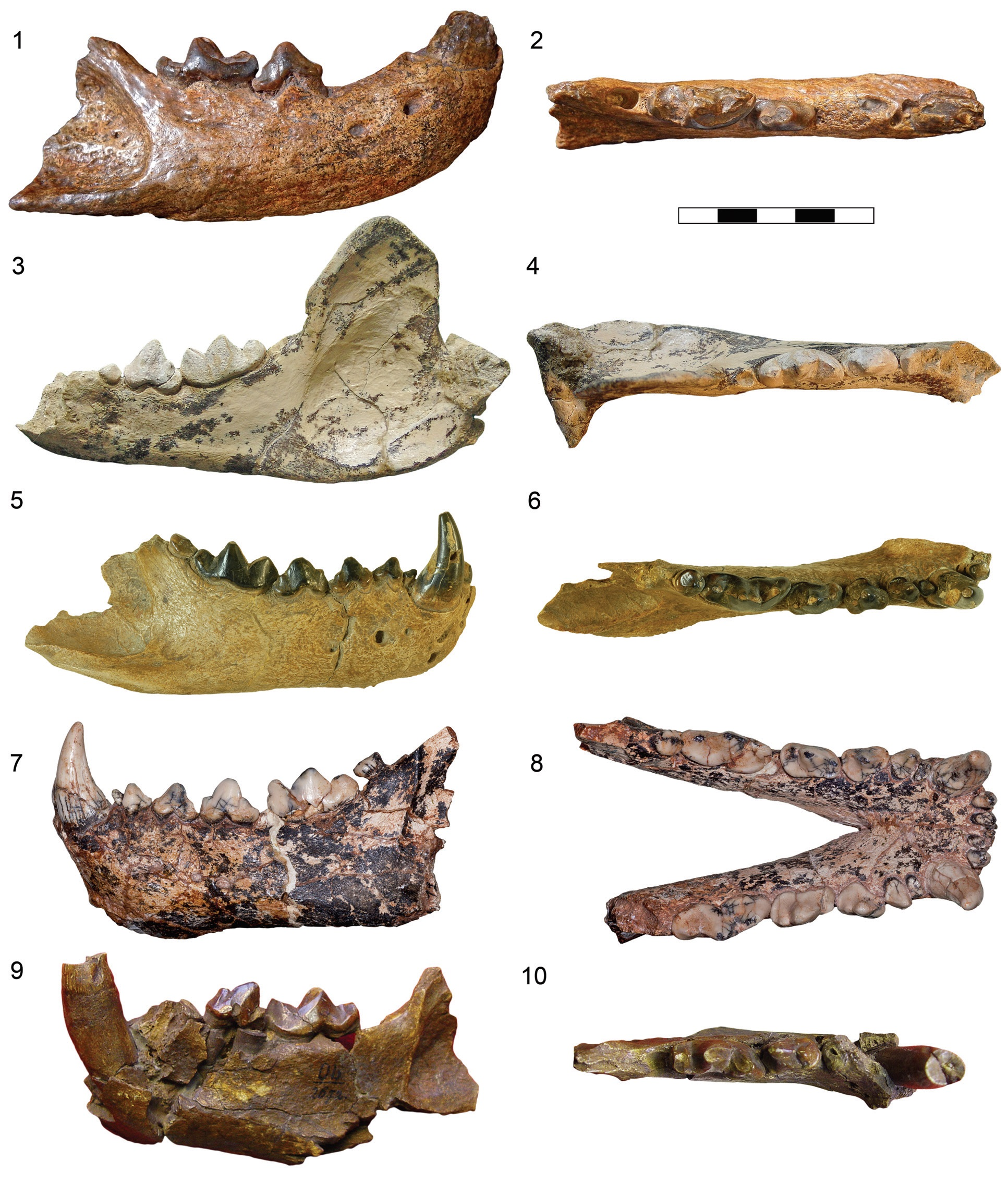
Comparison of Eomellivora species

E. piveteaui was a cursorial carnivore that consumed meat and bones.
