= Schlözer =

Schlözer is a surname. People named Schlözer include:

- August Ludwig von Schlözer (1735–1809), German historian
- Caroline Friederike von Schlözer (1753–1808), German painter
- Dorothea von Rodde-Schlözer (1770–1825) German scholar
- Paul de Schlözer (1842–1898), Polish or Russian pianist and teacher
- Kurd von Schlözer (1822–1894), German historian and diplomat
- Boris de Schlözer (1881–1969), Russian writer and musicologist
