= Roederer =

Roederer is a surname, and a spelling variant of the German surname Röderer. Notable people with the surname include:

- Antoine Marie Roederer (1782–1865), a French politician, son of Pierre Roederer
- Caroline Friederike von Schlözer (née Caroline Friederike Roederer; 1753–1808) German painter
- Jan-Peter Röderer (born 1986), German politician
- Johann Georg Roederer (1726–1763), a German physician
- Juan Gualterio Roederer (born 1929), an Italian-born Argentine-American academic administrator and physicist
- Karl Röderer (1868–1928), a Swiss sports shooter
- Louis Roederer, a Champagne house, or its founder
- Pierre Louis Roederer (1754–1835), French politician and historian
