= Arnold Hermann Ludwig Heeren =

German historian (1760–1842)

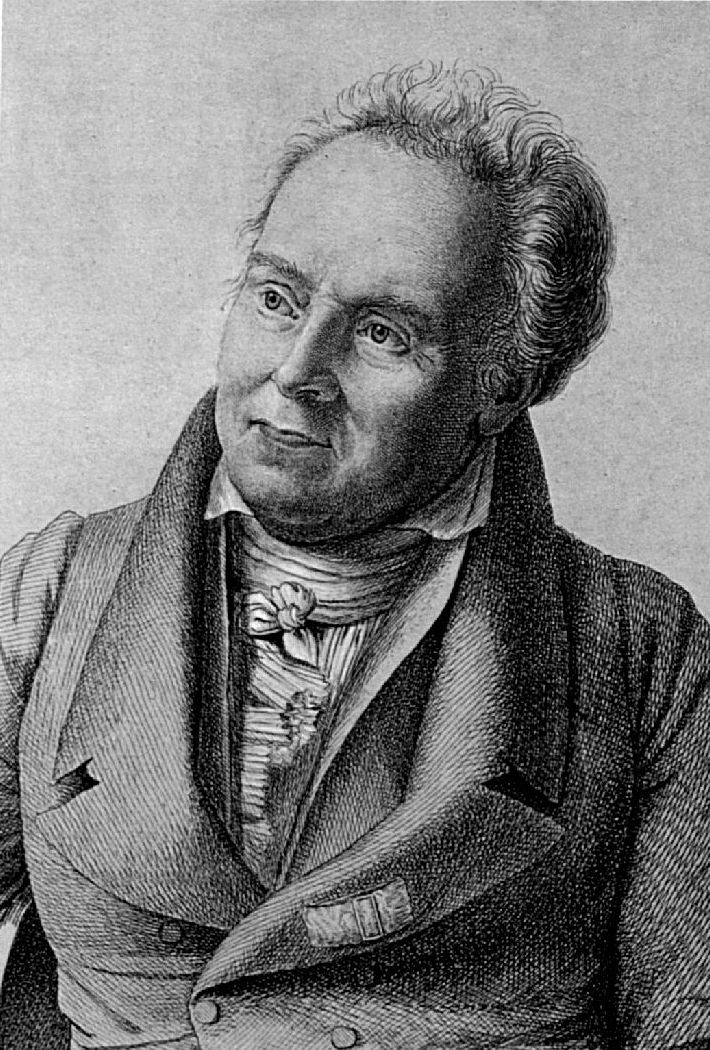
Arnold Hermann Ludwig Heeren.

Arnold Hermann Ludwig Heeren (25 October 1760, Arbergen – 6 March 1842, Göttingen) was a German historian who was professor of philosophy and history at the University of Göttingen. He was a member of the Göttingen school of history.

== Biography ==
Heeren was born on 25 October 1760 in Arbergen near Bremen, a small village in which his father was a clergyman. He spent the first 15 years of his life in Arbergen, where he was privately educated. From the beginning of the year 1776, shortly after his father had been appointed Prediger at the cathedral at Bremen, he attended the cathedral school there. At Michelmas 1779 he went on to the university at Göttingen, in accord with his father's wish that he work toward a degree in theology.

Having begun his studies at Göttingen, Heeren, like so many ambitious young men of that period, decided against theology as a vocation. (This did not, however, denote a turning away from religion; Heeren would remain sympathetic to religious belief throughout his life.) By Christian Gottlob Heyne he was introduced to philology, and by Ludwig Timotheus Spittler to the study of history. After much vacillation, Heeren let himself be persuaded by Spittler that his primary talent lay in historical research. It was the decisive moment of his young life.

With Heyne's blessing, Heeren decided to pursue an academic career. In 1784, having received his degree as a Doctor of Philosophy, he simultaneously earned the right to teach at Göttingen as a Privatdocent or adjunct professor. Though he recognized almost immediately that his true vocation lay elsewhere, his first scholarly work was in philology. In 1785 he published an edition of De encomiis by the rhetorician Menander, and proposed as well a critical edition of the Eclogae physicae et ethicae of Johannes Stobaeus. In connection with this work, as well as in hopes of improving his health, he then undertook (in July 1785) a trip to Italy, Paris, and the Netherlands. He spent seven months in Rome. Having a congenial personality, he immediately made himself at home there. Before departing he, the son of a Reformed clergyman, would earn the patronage of several Cardinals of the Catholic Church. He then passed two months in Paris.

After nearly two years he returned to Göttingen. With the sponsorship of Heyne, whose influence in Hannover was then at its height, and whose son-in-law he would later (1796) become, he was in June 1787 named to the faculty of the university itself as an außerordentlicher Professor of Philosophy. At Göttingen, such established scholars as Johann Christoph Gatterer, August Ludwig von Schlözer and Spittler were still active as historians. Now making his first appearance as a public lecturer, Heeren was careful to confine his teaching to a middle ground between History and Philology, partly out of diffidence and partly of a congenital indecisiveness. He thus avoided for some years a direct commitment to the discipline in which he would later become famous. During this period Heeren undertook with his friend Thomas Christian Tychsen a “Library of Ancient Literature and Art,” which had a short-lived existence. At the same time he initiated publication of the edition of Johannes Stobaeus's Eclogues that he had prepared years earlier. The first part appeared at Easter in 1792. The edition would reach its conclusion with the fourth part some nine years later. The reception given the first part was by not encouraging; the work of Thomas Gaisford and Augustus Meineke would eventually supplant the completed edition.

Seeing that his true gift was not for philological work, Heeren only now moved decisively toward historical scholarship as his chosen field. External circumstances also played a role. In 1794 he was named ordentlicher Professor of Philosophy, although still without a specific area of specialization. But at this point Gatterer and Schlözer had begun visibly to age. Spittler would leave Göttingen entirely in 1797. Gradually, therefore, place was made for Heeren as a historian, despite the fact that, at this point, he could scarcely claim to stand on an equal footing with such established senior scholars. He officially assumed the title of professor of history in 1801.

Heeren had given lectures on ancient history as early a 1790. His new circumstances soon brought out his talent as a historian of classical antiquity, in which he would achieve both intellectual fulfillment and great scholarly eminence. From his earlier lectures grew his magisterial Politics, Trade, and Commerce in the Ancient World, which would go through numerous later editions, with Heeren providing fundamental revisions as it continued to appear. With the appearance of the first edition, Heeren awoke to find himself famous. Even today, when Heeren has become a minor figure in the story of nineteenth-century German scholarship, his name continues to be associated with this work.

Part of its success was due to Heeren's fortunate choice of subject. Trade and commerce, hitherto neglected by historians, was now not only being pursued but, in Heeren's work, made the subject of thorough research. It has been supposed that Heeren's Bremen background and his childhood memories of that thriving commercial city motivated his work.

Outside Germany, Heeren's volume earned immediate acclaim. It was soon translated into several foreign languages. The effect of this reception on Heeren was lasting, no doubt explaining why, in his unpublished autobiographical writings, he would continue to lay particular stress on the importance of what he called the “politico-mercantile” dimension of history. As a Göttingen professor, however, Heeren did not confine himself to that subject. He earned an enviable reputation as a teacher. As a writer, he would be recognized for his broad range of historical interests. Although they would later pass into relative obscurity, his History of Ancient Civilizations (Göttingen, 1799) and his History of European States and their Colonies (Göttingen 1809) met with the success of his earlier work, going through numerous editions. Though he would show himself to have little real feel for medieval history, he did venture some work in that direction as well. His History of Classical Literature Since the Revival of Learning (Göttingen, 1792–1802, 2 vols) was by his contemporaries judged something of a failure. On the other hand, his Untersuchungen über die Kreuzzüge, translated into French as Essai sur l'influence des croisades ("Essay on the Influence of the Crusades") by his friend Charles de Villers, would in 1806 be awarded a prize by the Institute de France.

Heeren had little interest in contemporary politics, and would later be criticized in his own country for having taken refuge in the study of antiquity when German politics were moving toward the crisis of 1848. This refusal of political engagement, Franz Xaver von Wegele would write a generation later in the Allegemeinen Deutschen Biographie, was largely responsible for “the rapid fading of what had once been his shining star” (das rasche Verbleichen seines einst strahlenden Gestirnes).

Nonetheless, Heeren did not let his powers wane in his later years. He widened the scope of his university lectures to include recent work in demography and geography. After Johann Gottfried Eichhorn’s death in 1827 he took over the editorship of the Göttische Gelehrte Anzeigen. He deposited in the Göttingen Societät der Wissenschaften his research materials on the sources used by various ancient historians and geographers, inspiring a number of his students, most notably Georg Heinrich Pertz, to embark on similar research in other historical periods. Nonetheless, he would live to see his own reputation eclipsed by members of a rising generation, with his own colleagues among those who joined the attacks on certain of his own chief works.

In Göttingen itself Heeren's name would be all but forgotten. Twenty years earlier, when G.H. Pertz and Friedrich August Ukert had initiated their ambitious project on the History of the European States, it was Heeren that they had eagerly besought as their main editor. When he died on 6 March 1842 in his eighty-second year, his passing was hardly noticed by those in the immediate vicinity. Only six students from the university would follow Heeren's coffin to his grave. At the time of his death, few recalled how immensely influential had been his writings, and how distinguished his reputation as a historian, in his own time.

== Sources ==
The above article is a translation of the original entry by Franz Xaver von Wegele in the Allegemeine Deutsche Biographie, vol. 11 (1880), 244–246.

== Works ==
Heeren's chief works are:

- Ideen über Politik, den Verkehr, und den Handel der vornehmsten Völker der alten Welt (2 vols., Göttingen, 1793–1796; 4th ed., 6 vols., 1824–1826; Eng. trans., Oxford, 1833)
  - Part 1.1
  - Part 1.2
- Geschichte des Studiums der classischen Litteratur seit dem Wiederaufleben der Wissenschaften (2 vols., Göttingen, 1797–1802)
- Geschichte der Staaten des Altertums (Göttingen, 1799)
- Geschichte des europäischen Staatensystems (Göttingen, 1800)
- Versuch einer Entwickelung der Folgen der Kreuzzüge für Europa (Göttingen, 1808; French trans., Paris, 1808), a prize essay of the Institute of France.

Besides these, Heeren wrote brief biographical sketches of Johannes von Müller (Leipzig, 1809); Ludwig Timotheus Spittler (Berlin, 1812); and Christian Gottlob Heine (Göttingen, 1813). With Friedrich August Ukert (1780–1851) he founded the famous historical collection, Geschichte der europäischen Staaten (Gotha, 1819 seq.), and contributed many papers to learned periodicals. A collection of his historical works, with autobiographical notice, was published in 15 volumes (Göttingen, 1821–1830).
