= Gatterer =

Gatterer is a surname. Notable people with the surname include:

- Bat-El Gatterer (born 1988), Israeli taekwondo athlete
- Christoph Wilhelm Jacob Gatterer (1759-1838), German historian
- Johann Christoph Gatterer (1727-1799), German historian
