= Ludwig Wachler =

German librarian and historian (1767–1838)

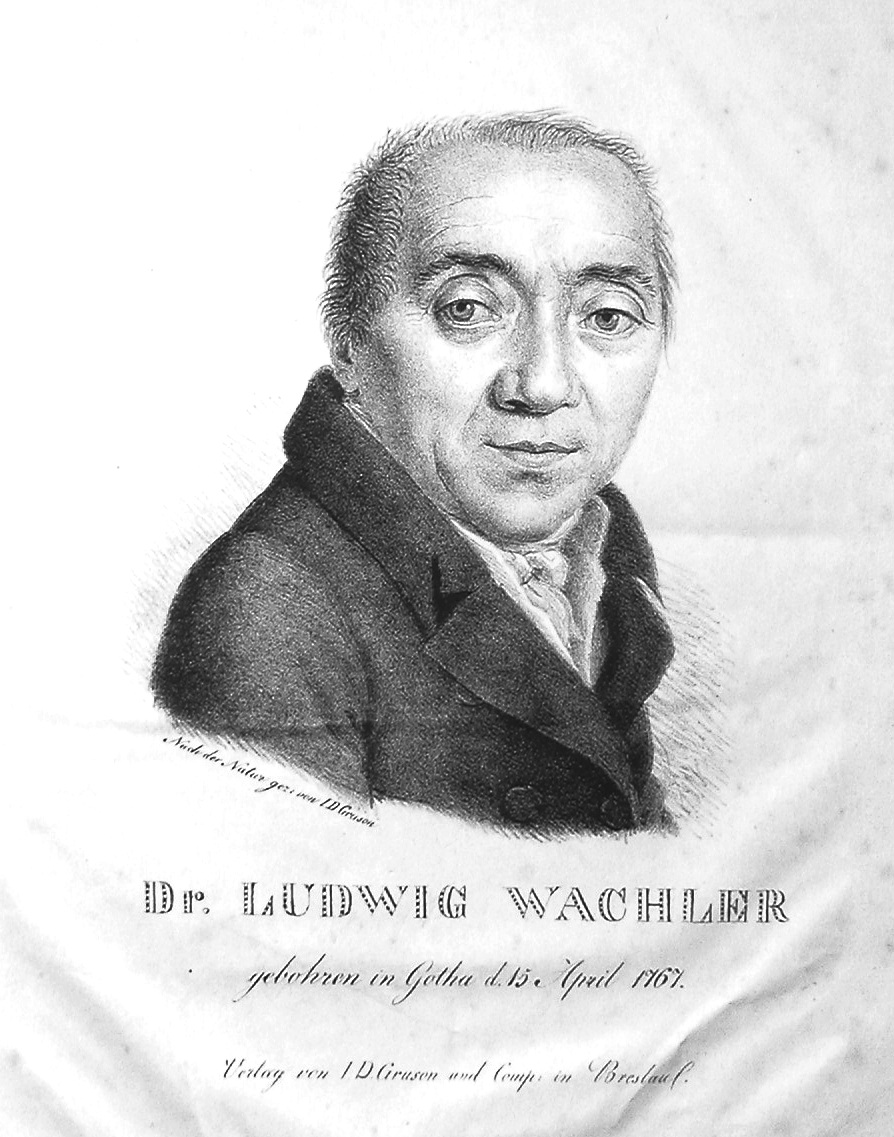
Sketch of Ludwig Wachler

Johann Friedrich Ludwig Wachler (15 April 1767, Gotha – 4 April 1838, Breslau) was a German literary historian and theologian. He was the father-in-law of lexicographer Franz Passow.

== Biography ==
Wachler studied theology from 1784 at the University of Jena, but due to consequences stemming from a duel, he was forced to leave Jena, and subsequently relocated to the University of Göttingen, where he became a student of philology. At Göttingen he was a pupil of Christian Gottlob Heyne, Ludwig Timotheus Spittler and Johann Christoph Gatterer. In 1788, Wachler became an associate professor at Rinteln, where he gave lectures in philology and church history. In 1790 he was named rector at the gymnasium in Herford, and four years later returned to Rinteln as a professor of theology. In 1797 he succeeded Johann Matthäus Hassencamp as editor of the magazine, "Annalen der neuesten theologischen Litteratur und Kirchengeschichte" (since 1798 known as the "Neuen theologischen Annalen").

In 1801, Wachler was appointed professor of philosophy at the University of Marburg, where he later attained the chair of history and was also named a professor of theology. In 1815 he was appointed chair of history at the University of Breslau.

== Selected works ==
- Grundriss einer Encyklopädie der theologischen Wissenschaften, 1795 – Encyclopedia of theological science.
- Geschichte der historischen Forschung und Kunst : seit der Wiederherstellung der litterarischen Cultur in Europa, (2 volumes 1812, 1820) – History of historical research and art, since the restoration of literary culture in Europe.
- Vorlesungen über die Geschichte der teutschen Nationallitteratur (2 volumes 1818, 1819) – Lectures on the history of German national literature.
- Lehrbuch der Litteraturgeschichte, 1827 – Textbook of literary history.
