= Ludwig Timotheus Spittler =

German historian (1752–1810)

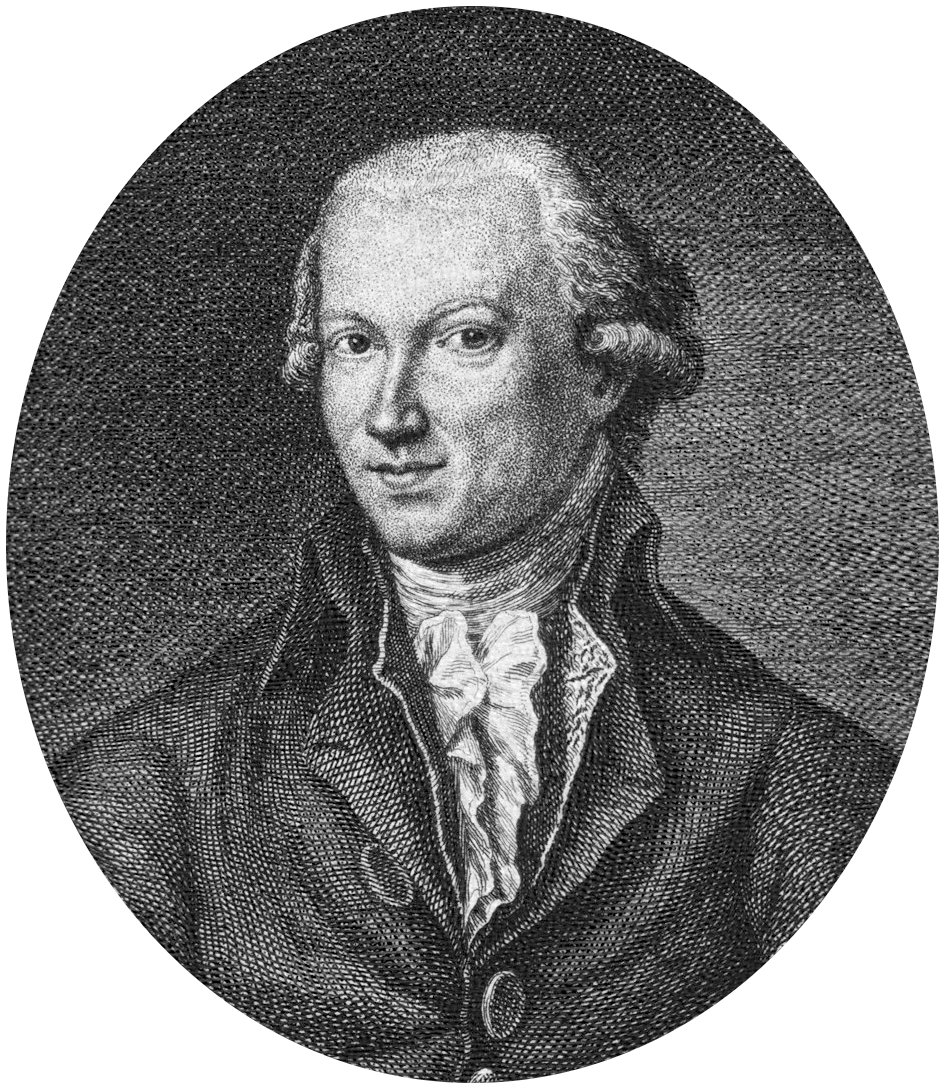
- Born: 11 November 1752; Stuttgart, Duchy of Württemberg
- Died: 14 March 1810 (aged 57); Stuttgart, Kingdom of Württember
- Other name: Ludwig Timotheus von Spittler

Ludwig Timotheus von Spittler (German: [ˈʃpɪtlɐ]; 11 November 1752 – 14 March 1810) was a German historian, born in Stuttgart. He published works on national, church and political history. He was a member of the Göttingen school of history.

== Education ==
Spittler studied at Tübingen, and in 1778 became a full professor at the University of Göttingen. At Göttingen he collaborated on several important projects with historians August Ludwig von Schlözer (1735–1809), Johann Christoph Gatterer (1727–1799) and constitutional law teacher Johann Stephan Pütter (1725–1807). With philosopher Christoph Meiners (1747–1810), he published the Göttingische Historische Magazin from January 1787 to August 1791.

== Career ==
In 1786 he wrote Geschichte des Fürstenthums Hannover seit der Reformation ("History of the Hanover Principality since the Reformation"), and in 1796, published Geschichte der Dänischen Revolution im Jahr 1660, a book in which he described how Frederick III introduced political absolutism in Denmark. Another influential work of Spittler's was Landesgeschichte in der Zeit der Deutschen Spataufklarung ("The Country's History during the German Spataufklarung").
