= Trasimene =

Trasimene may refer to:

- Lake Trasimeno, in Italy
- Trasimène, a 1809-1814 département in the First French Empire
- Battle of Lake Trasimene, a major battle in the Second Punic War
- Trasimene Line, a German defensive line in Italy during World War II
