= Johann Jakob Fried =

German obstetrician

Johann Jakob Fried (21 April 1689, Strasbourg, France – 3 September 1769, Strasbourg) was a obstetrician who lived in an area then controlled by France. He is sometimes referred to as the "Father of German midwifery". His son, Georg Albrecht Fried (1736-1773), was also a noted obstetrician.

In 1710 he obtained his doctorate from the University of Strasbourg with a dissertation thesis titled ""De cordis palpitatione". From 1728 onward, he was director of the Prätor Franz Josef von Klinglin municipal midwifery school in Strasbourg, a popular school that attracted students from throughout Europe. He was considered an excellent teacher, and he played a major role during the advent of scientific obstetrics in Germany. Among his better known pupils was future Göttingen professor, Johann Georg Roederer.

== Works associated with Johann Jakob Fried ==
- "Praelectiones materiae medicae D.D. Paul. Hermanni ... / Pensum IV." (as contributor), 1709.
- "Gravidarum urinae suppressio, non remidiis internis, sed catheteris adplicatione, unicae curanda", in: Acta physico-medica Ac. Caesareae Leopoldino-Carolinae, ebd. 1742, S. 422-25.
- "La vie et l'œuvre François Mauriceau : introduction de ses idées en Alsace au XVIIIeme siecle par Johann Jakob Fried et son fils Georg Albrecht", by Bénédicte Marie Catherine Luff, Strasbourg, 1983.
