= Göttingen school of history =

Group of 18th century historians

The Göttingen school of history was a group of German historians associated with a particular style of historiography located at the University of Göttingen in the late 18th century. The group coined a new terminology for the scientific racism in their works, introducing the terms Caucasian or white race; Mongolian or yellow race; Malayan or brown race; Negroid or black race; and American or red race.

== Attempt to write universal history with new critical methods ==
The University of Göttingen was the original center of the "Geschichtswissenschaft", or history as an academic discipline, and became a major centre for globally-orientated anthropology. The University of Göttingen itself was one of the newest universities in Europe, having been founded in 1734 by Gerlach Adolph von Münchhausen, and the first to include the obligation to conduct and publish research alongside lecturing. The historians of this school sought to write a universal history by combining the critical methods of Jean Mabillon with those of the philosophical historians such as Voltaire and Edward Gibbon.

== Coining a new terminology for scientific racism ==
This group of historians played an important role in creating a scientific basis for historical research, and were also responsible for coining two fundamental groups of terminologies in scientific racism:

- Blumenbach and Meiners's color terminology for race: Caucasian or white race; Mongolian or yellow race; Malayan or brown race; Negroid or black race; and American or red race;
- Gatterer, Schlözer and Eichhorn's Biblical terminology for race: Semitic, Hamitic and Japhetic.

== List of academics ==
- Johann David Michaelis (1717–1791), first chair of the department of Oriental Studies and Biblical Sciences
- Johann Christoph Gatterer (1727–1799)
- Christian Gottlob Heyne (1729–1812)
- August Ludwig von Schlözer (1735–1809)
- Christoph Meiners (1747–1810)
- Johann Gottfried Eichhorn (1752–1827), second chair of the department of Oriental Studies and Biblical Sciences
- Ludwig Timotheus Spittler (1752–1810)
- Johann Friedrich Blumenbach (1752–1840)
- Arnold Hermann Ludwig Heeren (1760–1842)
