= Johann Matthäus Hassencamp =

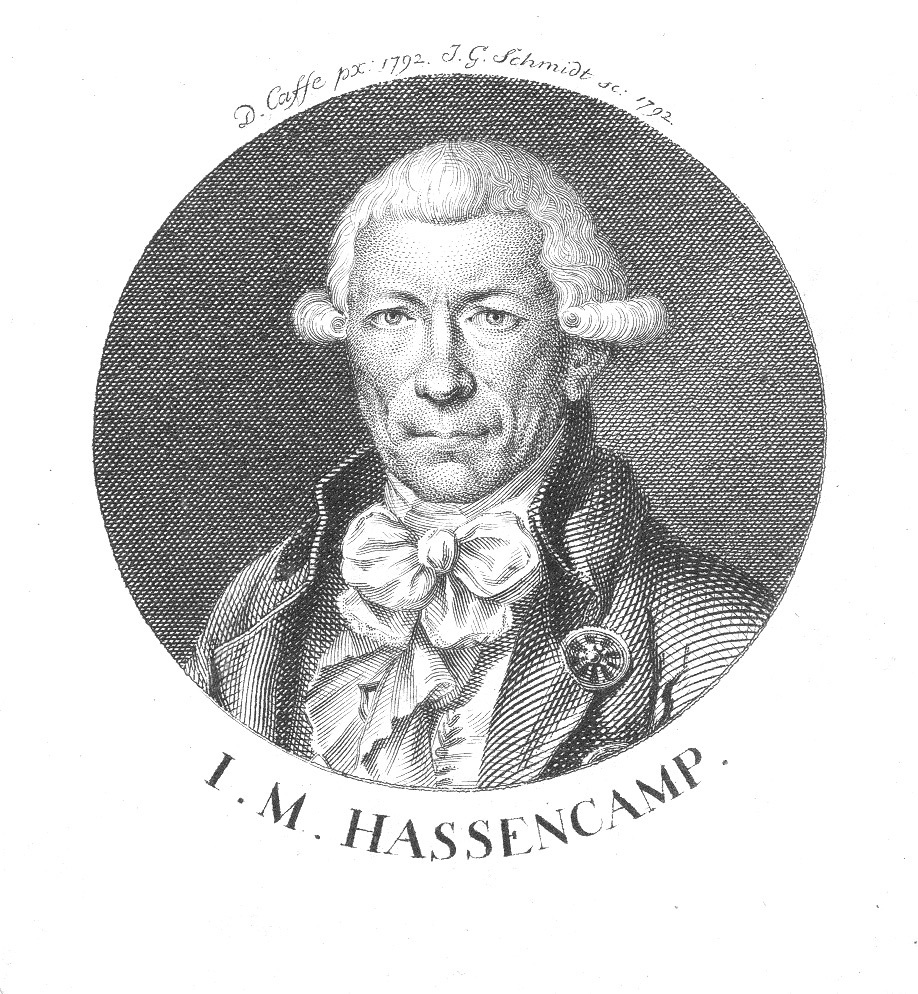
Johann Matthäus Hassencamp

Johann Matthäus Hassencamp (28 July 1743 – 6 October 1797) was a German Orientalist and Protestant theologian born in Marburg.

He studied philology, mathematics, theology and philosophy at the Universities of Marburg and Göttingen. Afterwards, he continued his studies in France, Holland and England, followed by a return to Marburg, where in 1768 he received his habilitation. Later, he became a professor of Oriental languages and mathematics at the university in Rinteln, where in 1777 he was given additional responsibilities as head of the university library.

Among his published works was a treatise on the Pentateuch, titled "Commentatio philologico-critica de Pentateucho LXX interpretum graeco non ex hebraeo sed samaritano textu converso", and the autobiography of theologian Johann David Michaelis, "Lebensbeschreibung von ihm selbst abgefasst, mit Anmerkungen von Hassencamp" (Written biography of himself, with the notes of Hassencamp; 1793). From 1789 up until 1797, he was an editor of the influential weekly magazine "Annalen der neuesten theologischen Litteratur und Kirchengeschichte" (Annals of the Latest Theological Literature and Church History; afterwards continued by Ludwig Wachler). In the fields of mathematics and physics, he published a work on the history involving efforts to determine longitude, titled "Kurze Geschichte der Bemühungen die Meereslänge zu erfinden" (1769).
