= Johann Gottfried Eichhorn =

German philologist and historian (1752–1827)

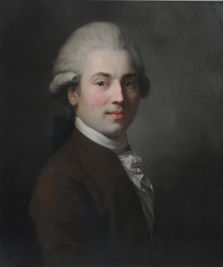
Johann Gottfried Eichhorn (1779), painting by Anton Graff.

Johann Gottfried Eichhorn (16 October 1752, in Dörrenzimmern – 27 June 1827, in Göttingen) was a German Protestant theologian of the Enlightenment and an early orientalist. He was a member of the Göttingen school of history.

== Education and early career ==
Born at Dörrenzimmern (now part of the city of Ingelfingen), in the Principality of Hohenlohe-Oehringen, Eichhorn was educated at the state school in Weikersheim, where his father was superintendent, at the gymnasium at Heilbronn and at the University of Göttingen (1770–1774), studying under Johann David Michaelis. In 1774 he received the rectorship of the gymnasium at Ohrdruf, in the duchy of Saxe-Gotha.

== Professorship in Jena 1775–1788 ==
In 1775 he was made professor of Oriental languages at the Faculty of Theology at Jena University. His published habilitation lecture was about "monetary matters of the early Arabs (De rei numariae apud Arabas initiis)" on the basis of the chronicle of Makin ibn al-'Amid. Later he edited the "Briefe über das arabische Münzwesen" by Johann Jacob Reiske. As a supplement to it he compiled the first commentated bibliography of Islamic numismatics in 1786 with more than 100 pages. It is still a reference tool for numismatic literature prior to this date. He also edited some historical works of the Reiske, who died 1774. Eichhorn was acquainted with him from time of his study in Göttingen.

During his professorship in Jena he wrote his seminal Introduction to the Old Testament (Einleitung in das Alte Testament) which was a breakthrough in the historical understanding of the Pentateuch. In 1776 he founded the first important journal for Oriental studies, the Repertorium für biblische und morgenländische Litteratur, which he edited until 1788.

== Professorship in Göttingen 1788-1827 ==
In 1788 he was elected professor ordinarius at Göttingen, where he lectured not only on Oriental languages and on the exegesis of the Old and New Testaments, but also on political history. Eichhorn was elected a corresponding member, living abroad, of the Royal Institute of the Netherlands in 1815. He was elected a Foreign Honorary Member of the American Academy of Arts and Sciences in 1825. His health was shattered in 1825, but he continued his lectures until attacked by fever on 14 June 1827. His son, Karl Friedrich, became a famous jurist.

== Achievements in theology ==
Eichhorn has been called "the founder of modern Old Testament criticism." He recognized its scope and problems, and began many of its most important discussions. "My greatest trouble," he says in the preface to the second edition of his Einleitung, "I had to bestow on a hitherto unworked field--on the investigation of the inner nature of the Old Testament with the help of the Higher Criticism (not a new name to any humanist)." His investigations led him to the conclusion that "most of the writings of the Hebrews have passed through several hands." He took for granted that all the supernatural events related in the Old and New Testaments were explicable on natural principles. He sought to judge them from the standpoint of the ancient world, and to account for them by the superstitious beliefs which were then generally in vogue. He did not perceive in the biblical books any religious ideas of much importance for modern times; they interested him merely historically and for the light they cast upon antiquity.

He regarded many books of the Old Testament as spurious, questioned the genuineness of the First and Second letters of Peter and the Epistle of Jude, denied the Pauline authorship of the First and Second letters to Timothy and to Titus. He suggested that the canonical gospels were based upon various translations and editions of a primary Aramaic gospel, but did not appreciate as sufficiently as David Strauss and the Tübingen critics the difficulties which a natural theory has to surmount, nor did he support his conclusions by such elaborate discussions as they deemed necessary. He challenged the Augustinian hypothesis solution to the synoptic problem and proposed an original gospel hypothesis (1804) which argued that there was a lost Aramaic original gospel that each of the Synoptic evangelists had in a different form.

== Selected bibliography ==
- Geschichte des Ostindischen Handels vor Mohammed (Gotha, 1775)
- De rei numariae apud arabas initiis (Jena 1776)
- Allgemeine Bibliothek der biblischen Literatur (10 vols., Leipzig, 1787–1801)
- Einleitung in das Alte Testament (5 vols., Leipzig, 1780–1783)
- Einleitung in das Neue Testament (1804–1812)
- Einleitung in die apokryphischen Bücher des Alten Testaments (Göttingen, 1795)
- Commentarius in apocalypsin Joannis (2 vols., Göttingen, 1791)
- Die Hebr. Propheten (3 vols., Göttingen, 1816–1819)
- Allgemeine Geschichte der Cultur und Literatur des neuern Europa (2 vols., Göttingen, 1796–1799)
- Literargeschichte (1st vol., Göttingen, 1799, 2nd ed. 1813, 2nd vol. 1814)
- Geschichte der Literatur von ihrem Anfänge bis auf die neuesten Zeiten (5 vols., Göttingen, 1805–1812)
- Übersicht der Französischer Revolution (2 vols., Göttingen, 1797)
- Weltgeschichte (3rd ed., 5 vols., Göttingen, 1819–1820)
- Geschichte der drei letzten Jahrhunderte (3rd ed., 6 vols., Hanover, 1817–1818)
- Urgeschichte des erlauchten Hauses der Welfen (Hanover, 1817).

== See also ==
- Orientalism
