= Kurd von Schlözer =

German diplomat (1822–1894)

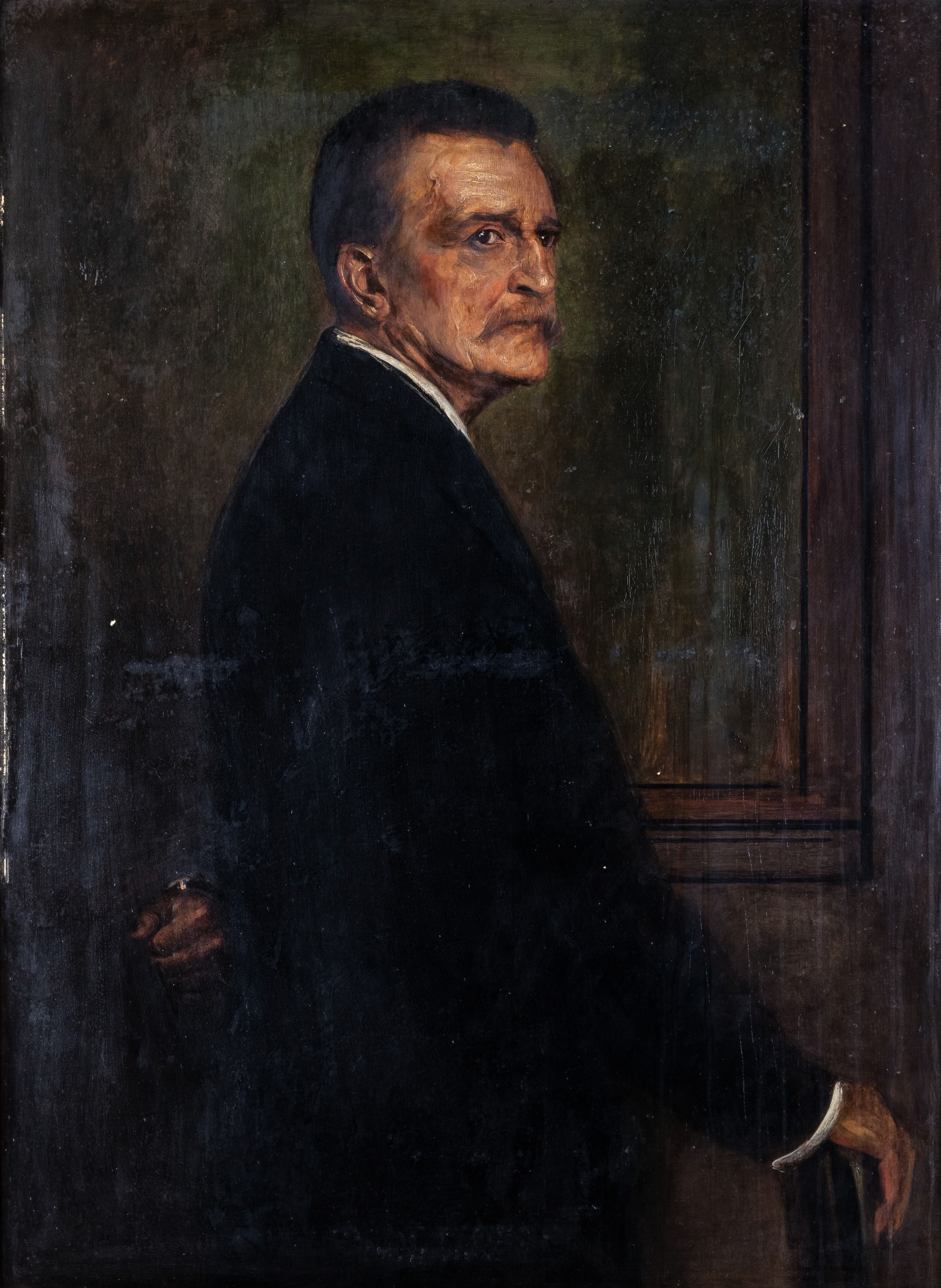
- Portrait by Franz von Lenbach, 1892

German Ambassador to the United States
- In office 1871–1882
- Preceded by: Johannes Rösing
- Succeeded by: Carl von Eisendecher

Personal details
- Born: Conrad Nestor von Schlözer; 5 January 1822 Lübeck, Free City of Lübeck
- Died: May 13, 1894 (aged 72) Berlin, Germany
- Relatives: Dorothea Schlözer (aunt)
- Occupation: Historian; diplomat

Kurd von Schlözer (original name Conrad Nestor von Schlözer; 5 January 1822, in Lübeck, Free City of Lübeck – 13 May 1894, in Berlin, Germany) was an imperial German historian, diplomat and German Ambassador to the United States from 1871 to 1882.

== Family ==
Schlözer was the son of Lübeck merchant, and Russian Consul-General Karl von Schlözer. Like his older brother Nestor of Schlözer, he also was named for the Russian saint Nestor of Kiev, the author of the Chronicle of Nestor, who had published his grandfather, the court counselor and professor August Ludwig Schlözer. Dorothea Schlözer was his aunt.

Kurd von Schlözer remained unmarried and childless.

== Life ==
After visiting the Katharineum of Lübeck, and the study of oriental studies and history at Hanoverian Göttingen and Berlin, Schlözer moved first to Paris and worked as a publicist.

Through the mediation of Ernst Curtius and the Princess Augusta, he was accepted without the customary legal training, into the Prussian diplomatic service. For several years he worked in the Foreign Ministry in Berlin, and wrote several historical treatises in addition to his work, Chasot including the Hanseatic League, the German-Russian history and a biography of the Count. As an author, he is attributed to the group of young Lübeck reformers de:Jung-Lübeck. In 1857, he was sent to St. Petersburg as a second Secretary of Legation.

In 1863 he was in Copenhagen, and in 1864 was in Rome. He was secretary of the Prussian ambassador at the Holy See, Friedrich Adolf von Willisen, and developed an extensive network of artists and church representatives. In 1867, he was Chargé d'affaires in a difficult political situation, between the Papal States and the Kingdom of Italy.

Following a mission on behalf of the North German Confederation to Mexico that led to the conclusion of a commerce and navigation treaty, Schlözer was appointed in 1871 as the first charge d'affaires of the German Empire in Washington, D.C. In letters and reports, he gave insights into the internal political situation of the United States. He maintained contact with German-American groups and individuals, including especially to Carl Schurz, and was universally liked.

In preparation for the resumption broken diplomatic relations between the Empire and the Holy See, he traveled to Rome in 1878 and 1881, and in 1882 was appointed as the Prussian envoy to Pope Leo XIII. In the preparation and implementation of the laws 1886/87, ending Kulturkampf, Schlözer experienced the peak of his diplomatic career.

A little later, after the dismissal of Bismarck, and probably at the instigation of Friedrich von Holstein, he retired in 1892.

Schlözer remained in Rome, and died shortly after his final return to Germany in Berlin in 1894. He was buried in the cemetery No. IV of the Jerusalem Church and New Church parishes on Bergmannstaße, where his tomb, designed by Bernhard Sehring today is maintained as a memorial grave of Berlin.

== Works ==
- Jugendbriefe. Stuttgart 1920
- Petersburger Briefe. Stuttgart 1921
- Römische Briefe. Stuttgart 1912
- Mexikanische Briefe. Stuttgart 1913
- Amerikanische Briefe. Stuttgart 1925
- Letzte römische Briefe. Stuttgart 1924

== Sources ==
- "Шлецер, Курд" . Brockhaus and Efron Encyclopedic Dictionary (in Russian). 1906.
