= Antoine-Marie Roederer =

French administrator and writer (1782–1865)

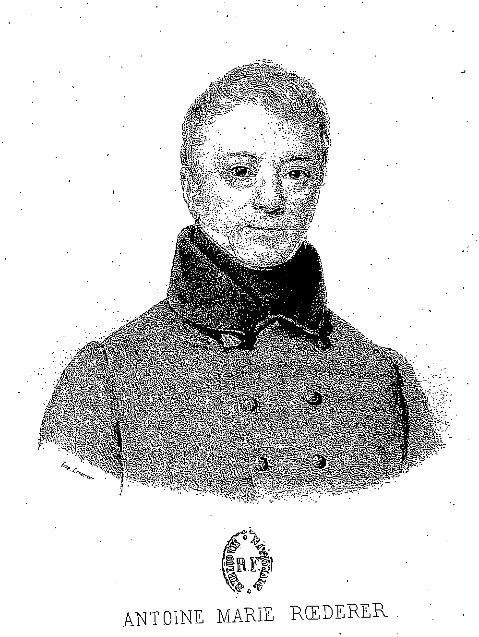
- Born: May 14, 1782
- Died: March 15, 1865 (aged 82); French
- Occupations: French administrator and writer

Antoine-Marie Roederer (14 May 1782 - 15 March 1865) was a French administrator and writer who served as Prefect of Trasimène under the First French Empire and was made a Peer of France by Louis-Philippe in 1845. In the Nobility of the First French Empire Roederer was created a Baron by Napoleon.

== Biography ==
Southern Departments of the French Empire showing Trasimène.

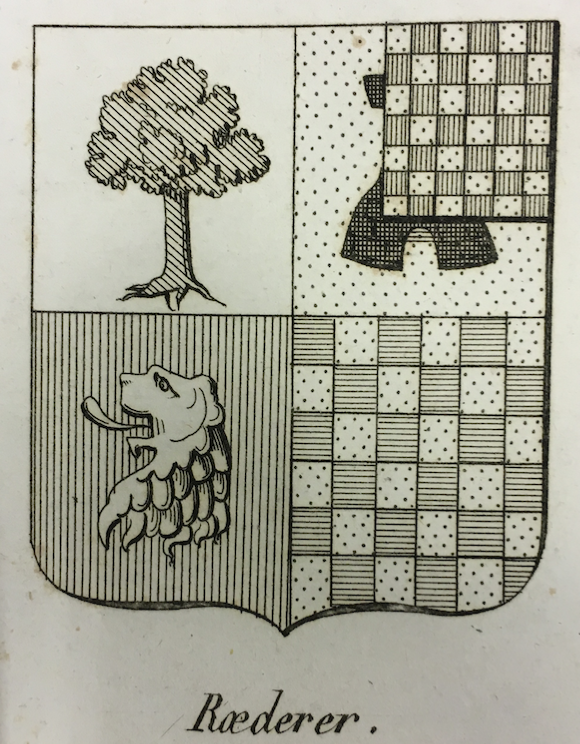
Coat of Arms of Antoine Marie Roederer as a Baron of the Empire.

The son of Pierre Louis Roederer and his wife Ève Régine Louise Walburge de Guaita, Antoine-Marie was born on 14 May 1782 in Metz, where his father was a councillor to the parlement. Elected to the Estates General of 1789 in 1789,Pierre Louis Roederer played a prominent role during the Revolution and was an ally and supporter of Napoleon Bonaparte in the coup d'état of 18th Brumaire in 1799, becoming a leading member of the Bonapartist regime.

Through the influence of his father, Antoine-Marie was then appointed an auditor of the Council of State and followed the former to Naples, where the elder Roederer was made Finance Minister for Joseph Bonaparte upon the French conquest of that kingdom. His father having followed Joseph Bonaparte to Spain in 1808, Antoine-Marie remained in Naples attached to the government of the new king, Joachim Murat.

Upon Napoleon's annexation of the Papal States the following year, Roederer was appointed Prefect of the newly created Department of Trasimène, under which name Umbria had been incorporated into the French Empire. The name derived from Lake Trasimene, the fourth largest in Italy, which lay the centre of the province, and which the classically minded Napoleon would doubtless have known from the famous Battle of Lake Trasimene in 217BC, at which Hannibal had decisively defeated the forces of the Roman Republic. Taking up his post in Spoleto on 6 September 1809, Roederer governed Trasimène loyally until its dissolution upon the fall of Napoleon in 1814, when the territory was returned to the restored Papal States.

During that time, the Prefect attempted to bring life in Umbria into line with that prevailing in the rest of the French Empire, introducing the Napoleonic Code and imposing the provisions of the Concordat of 1801 upon the Umbrian Church. Both these measures however, especially the Napoleonic Code's legalisation of divorce and the suppression of monastic institutions and confiscation of church property mandated by the Concordat, met with harsh resistance from a populace and clergy who had until recently been under the direct rule of the Pope, and so in large part sheltered thus far from the secularising innovations of the Revolution. Throughout his tenure, Roederer therefore found himself engaged in a bitter struggle with the Umbrian clergy as a result of the French reforms, and in consequence of Pius VII's injunction to his former subjects not to co-operate with the usurpers who had occupied his states in any matter contrary to Church law. The Umbrian clergy refused en masse to swear the oath of loyalty to the new government, and Roederer admitted that if a loophole in the Concordat had not exempted parish priests from the requirement to swear, Mass would have fallen silent in Umbria, as there would then have been no priests left there at all. By May 1811 the arrondissement of Spoleto, Roederer reported 100 out of 174 curés were either under arrest or deported for refusing to take the oath. On 11 September 1811 Napoleon made him a member of the Legion d'Honneur.

During the Hundred Days Roederer briefly served Napoleon once again as the Prefect of Aube.

Under the Bourbon Restoration he lived mostly in retirement, writing a history of the Roederer family and economic studies on tax reform and free trade. He purchased a chateau in Ménilles in 1838, and was made a Peer of France by Louis-Philippe in 1845. He lived to see the return of a Bonapartist regime and in 1858 Napoleon III promoted him to be an Officer of the Legion d'Honneur. He died in his home at Ménilles on 15 March 1865 and was buried with his wife.

He married Adélaïde Berthier, daughter of César Berthier, the brother of Louis-Alexandre Berthier, with whom he had four daughters.

== Sources ==
- Michael Broers, The Politics of Religion in Napoleonic Italy, London: 2002.
- "Antoine-Marie Roederer", in Adolphe Robert and Gaston Cougny, Dictionnaire des parlementaires français (1789–1891), Bourloton, Paris, 1889 Edition details Wikisource
