= Johann David Michaelis =

Prussian academic (1717–1791)

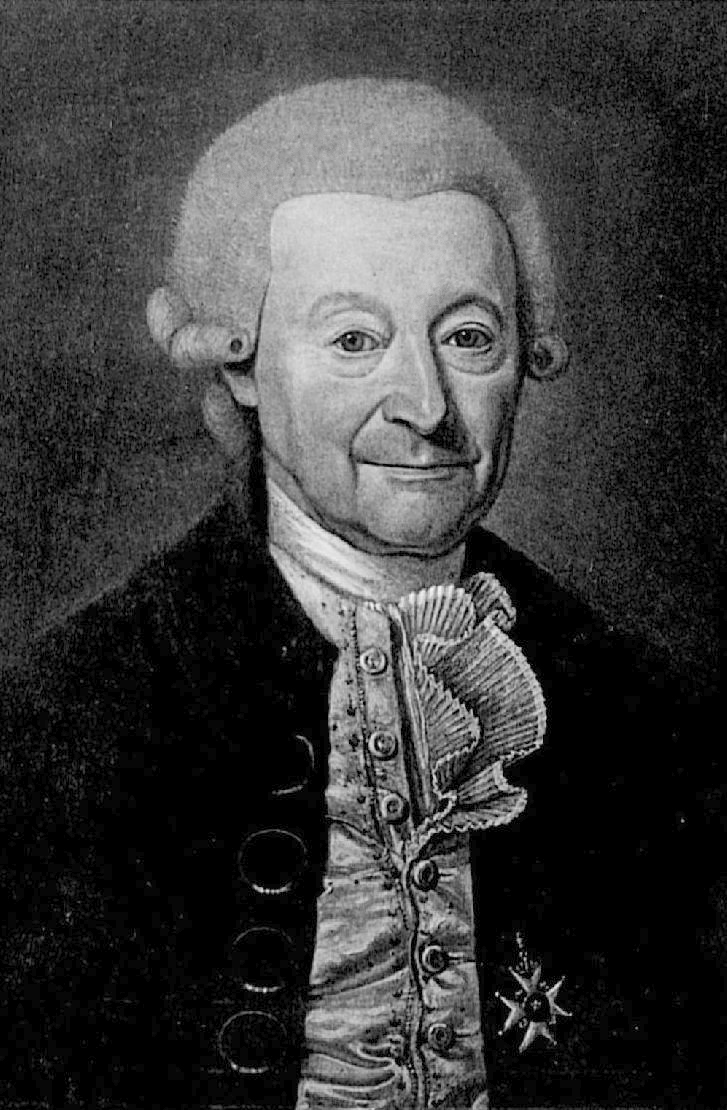
Johann David Michaelis (1790)

Johann David Michaelis (27 February 1717 – 22 August 1791) was a German biblical scholar and teacher. He was member of a family that was committed to solid discipline in Hebrew and the cognate languages, which distinguished the University of Halle in the period of Pietism. He was a member of the Göttingen school of history.

== Life and work ==
Michaelis was born on 27 February 1717 in Halle an der Saale. His Pietistic Lutheran family placed a great deal of importance in the study of Oriental languages in fulfilling the Church's goal. He was trained for academic life under his father's eye. At Halle he was influenced, especially in philosophy, by Siegmund J. Baumgarten (1706–1757), the link between the old Pietism and J. S. Semler, while he cultivated his strong taste for history under Chancellor Ludwig.

In 1739, he completed his doctoral dissertation, where he defended the antiquity and divine authority of the vowel points in Hebrew. His scholarship still moved along the old traditional lines, and he was also much exercised by certain religious scruples, with some seeing a conflict between his independent mind and that of submission to authority - encouraged by the Lutheranism in which he had been trained. He visited England and the Netherlands in 1741–1742. In Holland, he became acquainted with Albert Schultens, whose philological views would influence him. In 1745 he became an assistant professor (Privatdozent) of oriental languages at the Göttingen. In 1746 he became professor extraordinarius and in 1750 ordinarius. He remained in Göttingen until his death in 1791. From 1771-1785 he was editor of the Orientalische Und Exegetische Bibliothek.

One of his works was a translation of four parts of Samuel Richardson's Clarissa; and translations of some of the then current English paraphrases on biblical books showed his sympathy with a school which attracted him by its freer air. His Oriental studies were reshaped by reading Schultens; for the Halle school, with all its learning, had no conception of the principles on which a fruitful connection between Biblical and Oriental learning could be established. His linguistic work was hampered by the lack of manuscript material, which is felt in his philological writings, e.g., in his valuable Supplementa to the Hebrew lexicons (1784–1792). He could not become such an Arabist as J. J. Reiske; and, though for many years the most famous teacher of Semitic languages in Europe, neither his grammatical nor his critical work has left a permanent mark, with the exception perhaps of his text-critical studies on the Peshitta. He had a particular interest for history, antiquities, and especially geography and natural science. He had in fact started his university course as a medicinae cultor, and in his autobiography he half regrets that he did not choose the medical profession. In geography he found a field hardly touched since Samuel Bochart, in whose footsteps he followed in the Spicilegium geographiae hebraeorum exterae post Bochartum (1769–1780).

Michaelis inspired the famous Danish Arabia Expedition (1761–67), conducted by Carsten Niebuhr and Peter Forsskål. The cuneiform inscriptions Niebuhr brought back from the expedition were the basis for the earliest attempts made to decipher cuneiform. In spite of his doctrinal writings—which at the time made no little noise, so that his Compendium of Dogmatic (1760) was confiscated in Sweden, and the Knighthood of the Polar Star was afterwards given him in reparation—it was the natural side of the Bible that really attracted him. Michaelis arguably contributed the most in introducing the method of studying Hebrew antiquity as an integral part of ancient Eastern life.

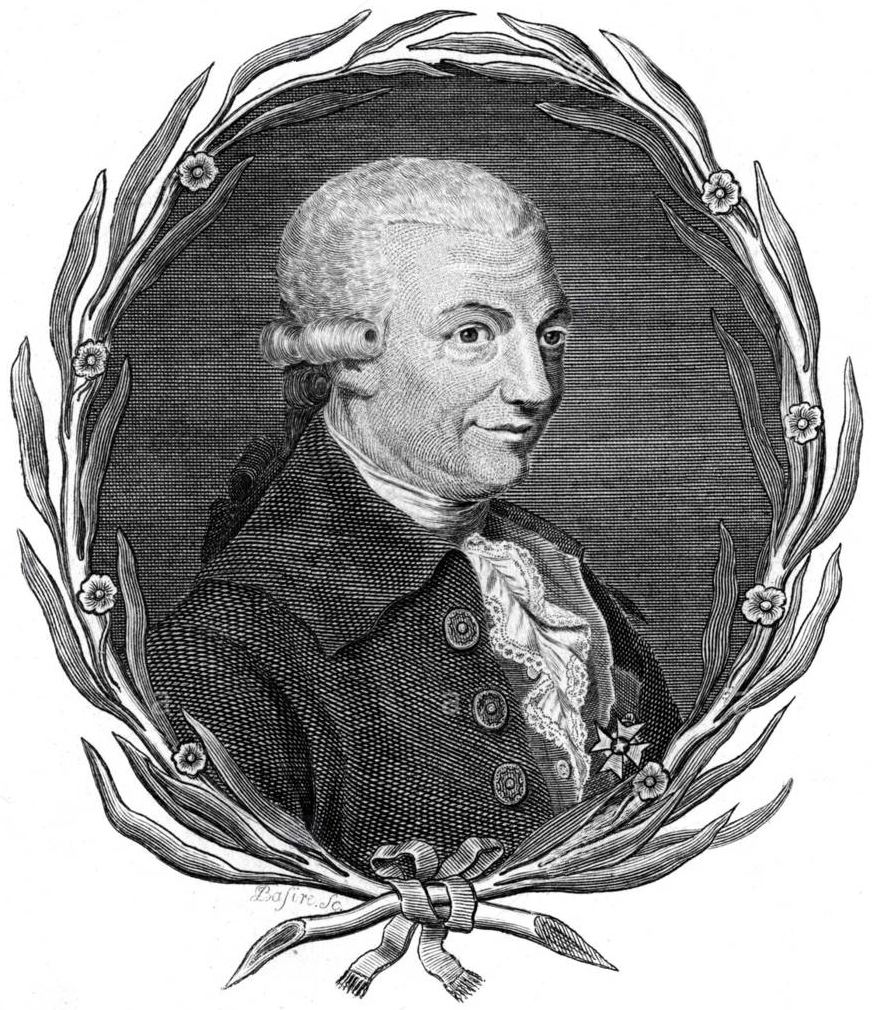
Johann David Michaelis (1717-91)

The personal character of Michaelis can be read between the lines of his autobiography with the aid of the other materials collected by J. M. Hassencamp (J. D. Michaelis Lebensbeschreibung, etc., 1793). The same volume contains a full list of his works. Besides those already mentioned it is sufficient to refer to his Introduction to the New Testament (the first edition, 1750, preceded the full development of his powers, and is a very different book from the later editions), his reprint of Robert Lowth's Praelectiones with important additions (1758–1762), his German translation of the Bible with notes (1773–1792), his Orientalische und exegetische Bibliothek (1775–1785) and Neue O. und E. Bib. (1786–1791), his Mosaisches Recht (1770–1771) (quite influenced by Montesquieu's L'esprit des lois of 1748) and his edition of Edmund Castell's Lexicon syriacum (1787–1788). His Litterarischer Briefwechsel (1794–1796) contains much that is interesting for the history of learning in his time.

He was elected a Fellow of the Royal Society in 1789.

== Family ==
- Michaelis' great uncle Johann Heinrich Michaelis (1668–1738) was the chief director of A.H. Francke's Collegium orientale theologicum, a practical school of Biblical and Oriental philology then quite unique, and the author of an annotated Hebrew Bible and various exegetical works of reputation, especially the Adnotationes uberiores in hagiographos (1720).
- Michaelis' daughter Luise Michaelis was briefly engaged to Gothic writer and philosopher Carl Grosse.
- In his chief publications J. H. Michaelis had as fellow-worker his sister's son Christian Benedikt Michaelis (1680–1764), the father of Johann David, who was likewise influential as professor at the University of Halle, and a sound scholar, especially in Syriac.
- Michaelis' daughter Caroline played an important role in early German Romanticism as the wife of critic August Wilhelm von Schlegel and later of philosopher Friedrich Wilhelm Joseph Schelling.
