= Johann Georg Roederer =

German obstetrician (1726–1763)

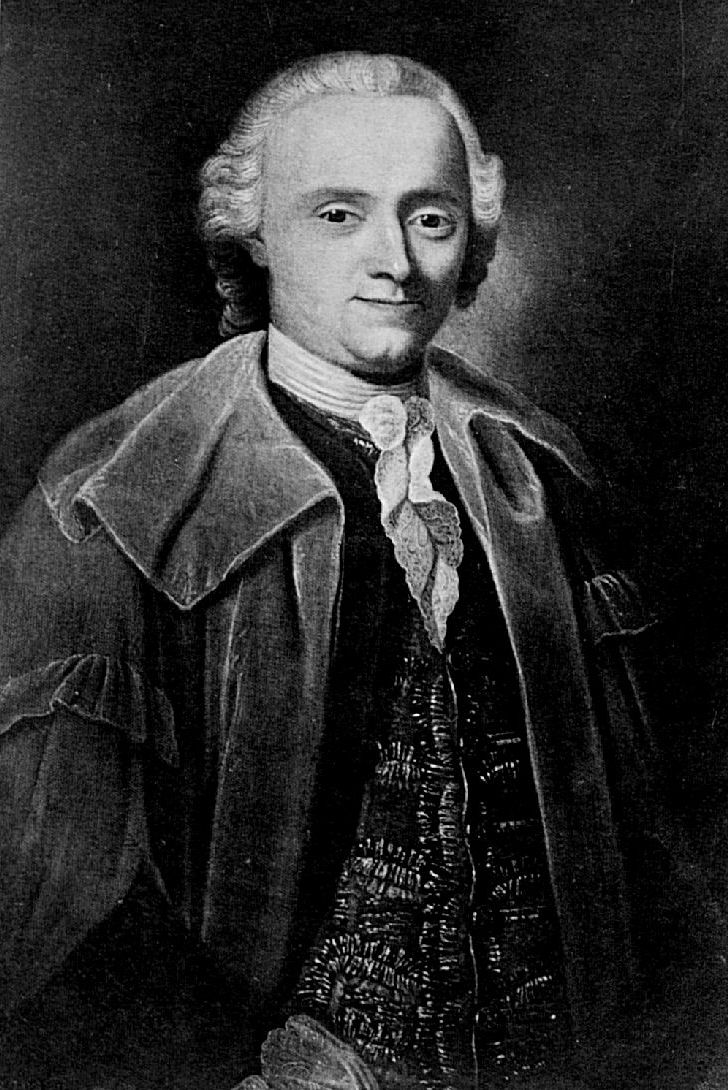
- Johann Georg Roederer
- Born: 13 May 1726
- Died: 4 April 1763 (aged 36)
- Children: Caroline Friederike von Schlözer
- Scientific career
- Fields: Physician, obstetrician

Johann Georg Roederer (13 May 1726 – 4 April 1763) was a French physician and obstetrician who was a native of Strasbourg.

== Life and career ==
Roederer studied medicine at Leiden, Paris and London, and afterwards was a pupil at the midwifery school in Strasbourg under Johann Jakob Fried (1689–1769). Through a recommendation from Albrecht von Haller (1708–1777), he was appointed in 1751 as the first professor of obstetrics at the University of Göttingen by George II, the British monarch and elector of Hanover.

Among his written works was a 1753 publication on the "elements of obstetrics" titled Elementa artis obstetriciae in usum auditorum, and a treatise involving observations made with Carl Gottlieb Wagler (1731–1778) on the typhoid epidemic at Göttingen (1757–1763). He was a member of the Académie Royale de Chirurgie, and in 1757, was elected a foreign member of the Royal Swedish Academy of Sciences.

His name is associated with the obstetrical term: Roederer-Kopfhaltung (Roederer-head position).

He died in Paris on 4 April 1763 at the age of 36. After his death, his position at Göttingen was filled by Heinrich August Wrisberg (1739–1808).

His daughter was noted artist, Caroline Friederike von Schlözer. He was father-in-law to historian August Ludwig von Schlözer (1735–1809).

== Sources ==
- This article is based on a translation of an equivalent article at the German Wikipedia, whose references include: ADB:Roederer, Johann Georg @ Allgemeine Deutsche Biographie.
