= Christoph Wilhelm Jacob Gatterer =

German cameralist and natural historian

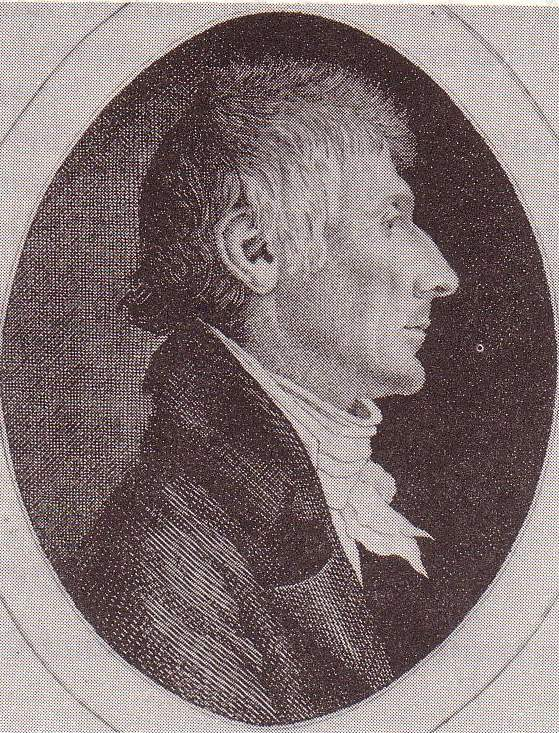
Christoph Wilhelm Jacob Gatterer

Christoph Wilhelm Jacob Gatterer (December 2, 1759 – September 11, 1838) was a German cameralist and natural historian born in Göttingen. He was the son of historian Johann Christoph Gatterer (1727–1799).

He studied natural sciences and mineralogy in Göttingen, earning his degree in 1778. In 1787 he became a professor of agriculture, forestry and technology at the University of Heidelberg. He later became a professor of diplomatics, and in 1803 was appointed director of the Schloßgarten in Heidelberg.

Gatterer was the author of Anleitung den Harz und andere Bergwerke mit Nutzen zu bereisen (1785–1794), a five-volume work on the Harz Mountains that placed emphasis on the region's natural history.
