= Charles de Villers =

French philosopher

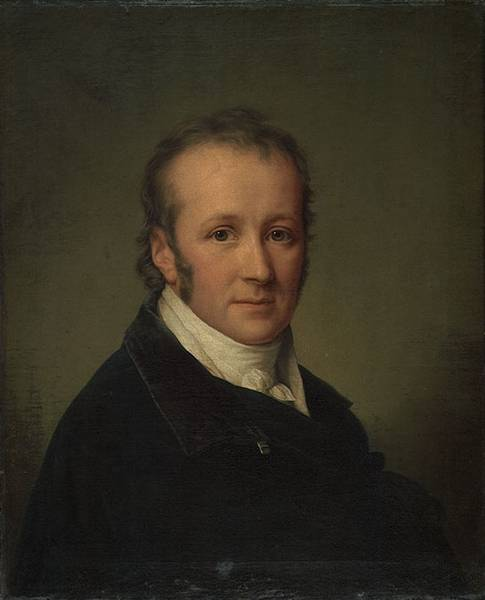
Charles de Villers by the artist Friedrich Carl Gröger, date unknown, c1800

Charles François Dominique de Villers (4 November 1765 – 26 February 1815) was a French philosopher. He was mainly responsible for translating the philosophy of Immanuel Kant into the French language.

== Life ==
Villers was born in Boulay-Moselle, France. He studied at the Benedictine College in Metz, and then became a student of the School of Applied Artillery of Metz. He attained the rank of captain. Like other officers of that era, such as the artillery colonel Armand Marie Jacques de Chastenet of Puysegur, he became interested in animal magnetism.

After the horrors of the French Revolution, Villers moved to Germany and there in Göttingen in 1794 befriended the German intellectual Dorothea von Schlözer and her husband, the Mayor Mattheus Rodde. The Rodde-Schlözer home was a centre for intellectuals across Europe. Dorothea was a pioneering female intellectual, the first woman to gain a doctors degree in Germany. Villers moved in with the Rodde-Schlözers in 1797 and they lived semi publicly as a menage a trois the rest of their lives. Villers' French nationality was able to preserve the household from the worst ravages of the French occupation in 1806. He reported these catastrophic events in his Lettre à Mme la Comtesse de Beauharnais, Fanny, contenant un récit des événements qui se sont passés à Lübeck dans le journées du jeudi 6 novembre 1806 et les suivantes.

In 1811, Villers was appointed Professor of Philosophy at the University of Göttingen. In 1814, after the downfall of the Kingdom of Westphalia, he was promptly sacked by the Government of the Kingdom of Hanover.

He died in Göttingen in 1815 aged forty-nine.

== Significance ==
Villers was significant as the individual who explained the works of Immanuel Kant to the French-speaking world. He portrayed the revolution in ideas produced by Kant as being as important in its significance as that produced by Descartes, Lavoisier and Copernicus.

== Works ==
- Le Magnétiseur amoureux (1787). Réédition : Vrin, Paris, 2006.
- De la Liberté : son tableau et sa définition; ce qu'elle est dans la société; moyens de l'y conserver (1791)
- Lettres Westphaliennes (1797)
- Notice littéraire sur M. Kant et sur l'état de la métaphysique en Allemagne au moment où ce philosophe a commencé d'y faire sensation (1798)
- Idée de ce que pourrait être une histoire universelle dans les vues d'un citoyen du monde (1798)
- Critique de la raison pure (1799). Résumé de l'œuvre de Kant.
- Philosophie de Kant, ou Principes fondamentaux de la philosophie transcendentale (1801)
- Lettre de Charles Villers à Georges Cuvier sur une nouvelle théorie du cerveau, par le Dr Gall, ce viscère étant considéré comme l'organe immédiat des facultés morales (1802)
- Esquisse de l'histoire de l'Église, depuis son fondateur jusqu'à la réformation, pour servir d'Appendice à l'Essai sur l'esprit et l'influence de la réformation de Luther (1804)
- Essai sur l'esprit et l'influence de la réformation de Luther, ouvrage qui a remporté le prix sur cette question proposée dans la séance publique du 15 germinal an X, par l'Institut national de France : Quelle a été l'influence de la réformation de Luther sur la situation politique des différens États de l'Europe, et sur le progrès des lumières ? (1804)
- Lettre à Mme la comtesse Fanny de Beauharnais, contenant un récit des événements qui se sont passés à Lübeck dans les journées du jeudi 6 novembre 1806 et les suivantes (1807)
- Coup d'œil sur les universités et le mode d'instruction publique de l'Allemagne protestante, en particulier du royaume de Westphalie (1808)
- Constitutions des trois villes libres-anséatiques, Lubeck, Bremen et Hambourg. Avec un mémoire sur le rang que doivent occuper ces villes dans l'organisation commerciale de l'Europe (1814)
- Précis historique sur la présentation de la Confession d'Augsbourg à l'empereur Charles-Quint, par plusieurs princes, états et villes d'Allemagne, ouvrage posthume de Mr Charles de Villers, suivi du texte de la Confession d'Augsbourg. Nouvelle traduction française, accompagnée de notes (1817)

== Sources ==
- M. Isler: Letters to Ch de Villers. Auswahl aus dem handschriftlichen Nachlasse des Ch. de Villers . Selection from the estate of the handwritten Ch de Villers. Hamburg, 1883. Hamburg, 1883.
- Oskar Ulrich: Charles de Villers. Oscar Ulrich: Charles de Villers. Sein Leben und seine Schriften; ein Beitrag zur Geschichte der geistigen Beziehungen zwischen Deutschland und Frankreich . His life and his writings, a contribution to the history of the intellectual relations between Germany and France. Leipzig, 1899. Leipzig, 1899.
- Louis Wittmer: Charles de Villers (1765–1815). Louis Wittmer: Charles de Villers (1765–1815). Un intermédiaire entre la France et l'Allemagne et un précureur de Mme de Staël . Un intermédiaire entre la France et l'Allemagne et un précureur de Mme de Staël. Genève; Paris, 1908 Geneva, Paris, 1908
- Monique Bernard: Charles de Villers et l'Allemagne. Contribution à l'étude du Préromantisme européen, Thèse de 3e cycle, Université Paul Valéry, Montpellier, 1976. http://tel.archives-ouvertes.fr/tel-00981985
- Peter Winterling: Rückzug aus der Revolution, e. Unters. Peter Winterling: Withdrawal from the revolution, e. Unters. zum Deutschlandbild u. zur Literaturtheorie bei Madame de Staël u. Charles de Villers . the image of Germany and the literary theory of Madame de Stael and Charles de Villers. Rheinfelden: Schäuble, 1985. ISBN 3-87718-763-3 . Rheinfelden: Schäuble, 1985. ISBN 3-87718-763-3.
- Kurt Kloocke (Hrsg.): Correspondence Madame de Staël; Charles de Villers; Benjamin Constant . Kurt Kloock (ed.), Correspondence Madame de Stael, Charles de Villers, Benjamin Constant. Etablissement du texte, introd. Etablissement du texte, introd. et notes par Kurt Kloocke avec le concours d'un groupe d'étudiants. et notes par Kurt Kloock avec le concours d'un groupe d'étudiants. Frankfurt am Main; Berlin; Bern; New York; Paris; Wien: Lang, 1993. ISBN 3-631-46107-0 . Frankfurt, Berlin, Bern, New York, Paris, Wien: Lang, 1993. ISBN 3-631-46107-0.
- Hermann Krapoth: in Biographisches Lexikon für Schleswig-Holstein und Lübeck, Bd. 10, Villers . Hermann Krapoth: in Biographical Dictionary of Schleswig-Holstein, Luebeck, Volume 10, Villers. Neumünster 1994. ISBN 3-529-02650-6 Neumünster 1994th ISBN 3-529-02650-6
- Monique Bernard, Charles de Villers. De Boulay à Göttingen. Itinéraire d'un médiateur franco-allemand, Metz, Editions des Paraiges, 2016, 368 p. ISBN 978-2-37535-016-4 - http://www.editions-des-paraiges.eu/magasin/page3.html
