= Pierre Louis Roederer =

French politician, economist, and historian (1754–1835)

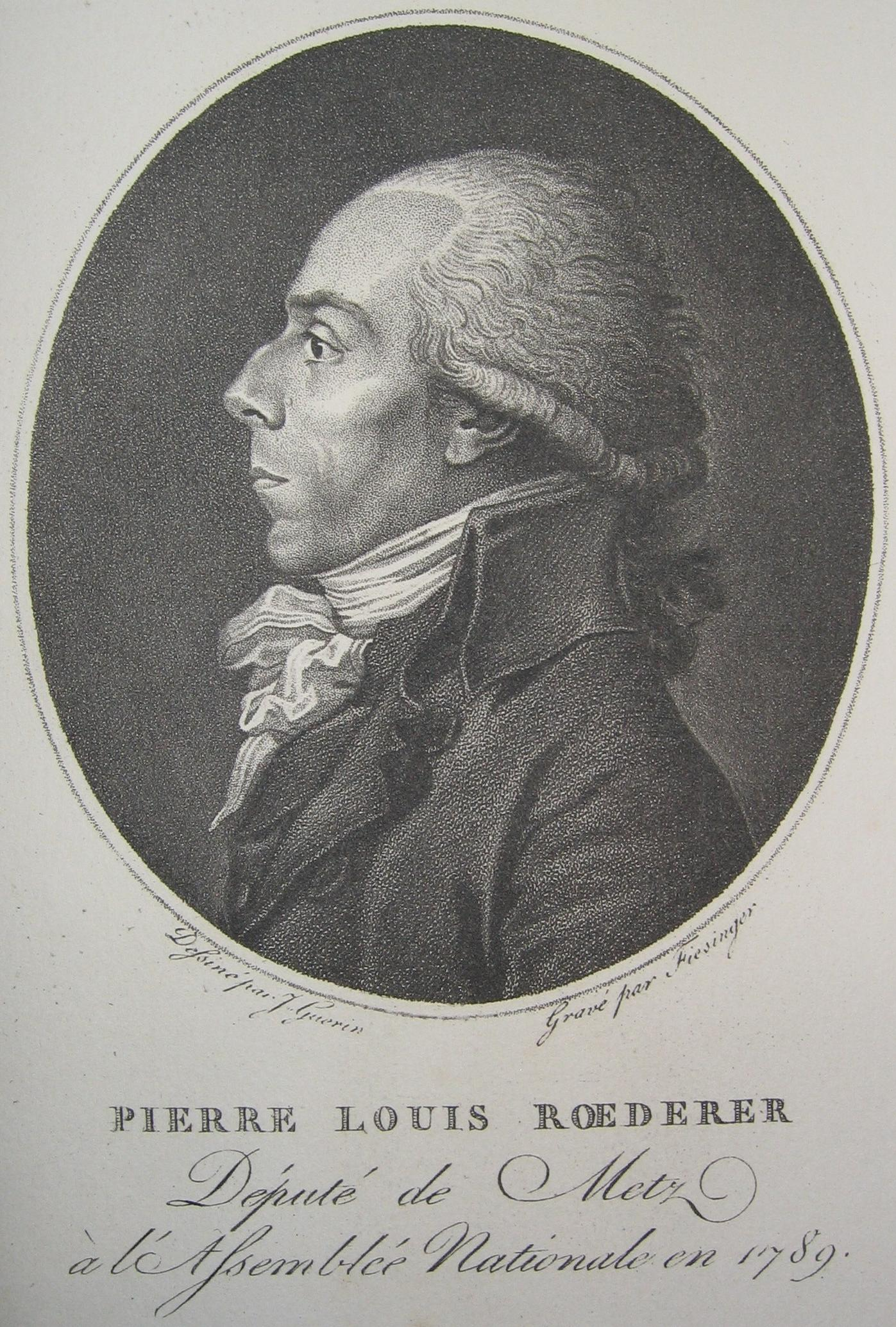
- Pierre-Louis Roederer, 1789
- Born: 15 February 1754; Metz
- Died: December 17, 1835 (aged 81); Bursard
- Education: University of Strasbourg
- Occupations: politician, economist, and historian
- Board member of: Académie Française

Comte Pierre Louis Roederer (15 February 1754 – 17 December 1835) was a French politician, economist, and historian, politically active in the era of the French Revolution and French First Republic. Roederer's son, Baron Antoine Marie Roederer (1782–1865), also became a noted political figure.

== Biography ==
=== Early activities ===
Born in Metz, the son of a magistrate, he studied law at the University of Strasbourg, and, at the age of twenty-five, became councillor at the parlement of Metz (in exchange for 32,000 livres), and was commissioned in 1787 to draw up a list of remonstrances. During the period, he became an admirer of the economist Adam Smith, and helped make his works known in France. His 1787 work Suppression des douanes intérieures advocated the suppression of internal customs houses; the 1911 Encyclopædia Britannica describes it as "an elaborate treatise on the laws of commerce and on the theory of customs imposts".

On the proposition of Roederer, in 1787, the Royal Society of Science and Arts of Metz offered a prize for the best essay in answer to the question: "What are the best means to make the Jews happier and more useful in France?". Abbé Gregoire was one of three laureates with his Essay on the physical, moral and political regeneration of the Jews. It was the first step towards their emancipation, which was always defended by Roederer.

In 1788 he published the boldly liberal pamphlet Députation aux États généraux ("Deputation to the Estates-General"). Partly on the strength of this he was elected deputy to the Estates-General by the Third Estate of the bailliage of Metz. Although not present at the event of June 1789, Roederer was sketched by Jacques-Louis David into his drawing of the Tennis Court Oath.

In the National Constituent Assembly, Roederer was a member of the committee of taxes (comité des contributions), prepared a scheme for a new system of taxation, drew up a law on patents, occupied himself with the laws relating to revenue stamps and assignats, and was successful in opposing the introduction of an income tax.

=== Paris Directory and hiding ===
After the close of the Constituent Assembly, he was elected, on 11 November 1791, procureur général syndic of the département of Paris. The directory of the département, of which the Duc de la Rochefoucauld d'Enville was president, was at this time in pronounced opposition to the radical views that dominated the Legislative Assembly and the Jacobin Club, and Roederer was not altogether in touch with his colleagues. For example, he took no share in signing their protest against the law against the non-juring clergy as a violation of religious liberty.

But the directory did not long survive: with the growing revolutionary opposition in the capital, many of its members resigned and fled, and their places could not be filled. Roederer himself left in his Chronique des cinquante jours ("Chronicle of fifty days", 1832) an account of the pitiable part played by the directory of the département in the critical period between the failed insurrection of 20 June 1792 and the successful insurrection of 10 August.

Seeing the perilous drift of things, he had tried to get into touch with King Louis XVI, and it was on his advice that the latter took refuge in the Assembly on the same 10 August. Roederer himself fell under suspicion and went into hiding during the Reign of Terror, emerging again only after the fall of Maximilien Robespierre and the start of the Thermidorian Reaction.

=== Consulate, Empire, and later life ===
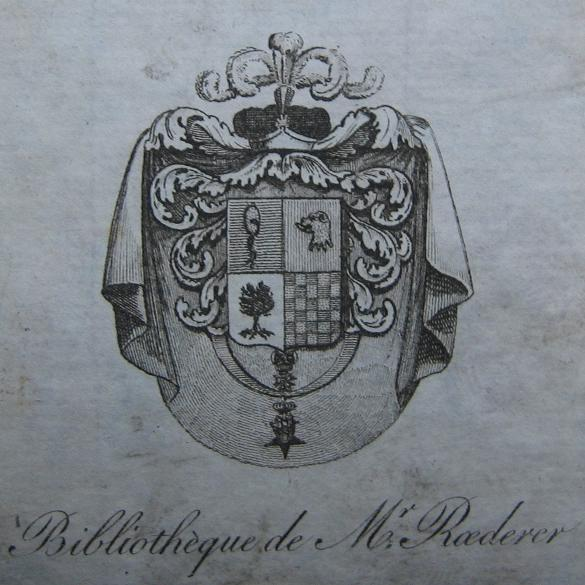
Arms of Roederer

In 1796, he was made a member of the Académie Française, was appointed to a professorship of political economy, and founded the Journal d'économie publique, de morale et de legislation. Having escaped deportation at the time of the coup d'état of 18 Fructidor, he took part in organizing Napoleon Bonaparte's 18 Brumaire Coup—alongside Emmanuel Joseph Sieyès, Charles Maurice de Talleyrand, Saint-Jean d'Angély, and Count Volnay—and wrote the Adresse aux Parisiens (Napoleon's speech to the people of Paris, given immediately after the coup).

He was appointed by Napoleon member of the council of state and senator. Roederer and Talleyrand contributed to Charles-François Lebrun's rise past Sieyès, and the former's appointment as Consul. In 1800, Roederer was Minister Plenipotentiary to the Batavian and Helvetic Republics. He received the Legion of Honor in 1803, and was made a Grand Officier in December 1807.

Under the Empire, Roederer, whose public influence was very considerable, was Joseph Bonaparte's minister of finance in the Kingdom of Naples (1806), assistant of Joseph in Spain (1809), administrator of the Grand Duchy of Berg (1810), and imperial commissary in the south of France. During the Hundred Days he was created a Peer of France.

The Bourbon Restoration government stripped him of his offices and dignities, and he became mayor of La Ferté-sous-Jouarre in April 1816. In 1830 he became mayor of the commune of Essay. He recovered the title of Peer in 1832, following the July Revolution of 1830. He died in Bursard, Orne.

== Works ==
- Dialogue concernant le colportage des marchandises (1783)
- En quoi consiste la prospérité d'un pays (1787)
- De la députation aux États généraux (1788)
- Discours de M. Rœderer, conseiller au parlement de Metz, prononcé a l'Assemblée nationale, a la séance du 17 novembre, au soir (1789)
- Observations sur l'élection d'un prétendu député de la ville de Metz aux États-généraux (1789)
- De la propriété considérée dans ses rapports avec les droits politiques (1792)
- Discours de M. Rœderer, prononcé à la Société des amis de la constitution, dans sa séance du dimanche 22 avril 1792, l'an 4e. de la liberté (1792)
- Mémoires sur l'administration du département de Paris (1795)
- Des institutions funéraires convenables à une république (1795)
- De l'intérêt des comités de la Convention (1795)
- Mémoires d'économie publique, de morale et de politique. Tome premier (2 parts, 1799)
- De la philosophie moderne et de la part qu'elle a eue à la Révolution francaise, ou, Examen de la brochure publiée par Rivarol sur la philosophie moderne (1799)
- Opuscules de littérature et de philosophie (3 parts, 1800–04)
- Discours sur le droit de propriéte, lus au Lycée les 9 décembre 1800 et 18 janvier 1801 (1801)
- La première et deuxième année du Consulat de Bonaparte (1802)
- Petits écrits concernant de grands écrivains (1803)
- Observations morales et politiques sur les journaux détracteurs du 18e siècle, de la philosophie & de la Révolution (1805)
- Louis XII (1820)
- Louis XII et François Ier", ou Mémoires pour servir à une nouvelle histoire de leur règne. Tome premier; Tome second; Tome troisième (1825–1833)
- Comédies historiques, de Louis XII à la mort de Henri IV (3 parts, 1827–30) :
  - Le Marguillier de Saint-Eustache (1819)
  - Le Fouet de nos pères
  - La Saint Barthélémy
- Les deux premières années du consulat de Bonaparte (1821)
- Comédies historiques (1827, nouvelle édition), Bevat: Le marguillier de Saint Eustache. Le fouet de nos pères, ou l'éducation de Louis XII en 1469. Le diamant de Charles-Quint. La mort de Henri IV, fragment d'histoire dialogué
- Conséquences du système de Cour établi sous François Ier (1830)
- Nouvelles bases d'élection (1830)
- Le budget de Henri, III, ou, Les premiers Etats de Blois, comédie historique; précédée d'une dissertation sur la nature des querres qu'on a qualifiées de querres de religion dans le seizième siècle; suivie d'une notice nouvelle sur la vie de Henri III (1830)
- L'Esprit de la Révolution de 1789, 235 p., Paris, 1831
- Chronique de cinquante jours, du 20 juin au 10 août 1792, rédigée sur pièces authentiques, 456 p., Paris, 1832
- Adresse d'un constitutionnel aux constitutionnels (1835)
- Mémoires pour servir l'histoire de la société polie en France (1835)
- Œuvres du comte P. L. Rœderer. Tome premier; Tome second; Tome troisième; Tome quatrième; Tome cinquième; Tome septième Tome huitième (publiée pas son fils, 1853–1859) (8 parts)
