= Trasimène =

Former French department of Italy (1809–1814)

Département de Trasimène
- Department of the First French Empire
- 1809–1814
- Location of Trasimène in France (1812)
- Capital: Spoleto
- Area
  - Coordinates: 42°44′N 12°44′E
  - 1813: 11,120 km^{2} (4,290 sq mi)
- Population
  - 1813: 300,025
- Government
- Prefect
  - 1809-1814: Antoine-Marie Roederer
- History
  - Annexation of the Papal States: 15 July
  - Treaty of Paris: 1814
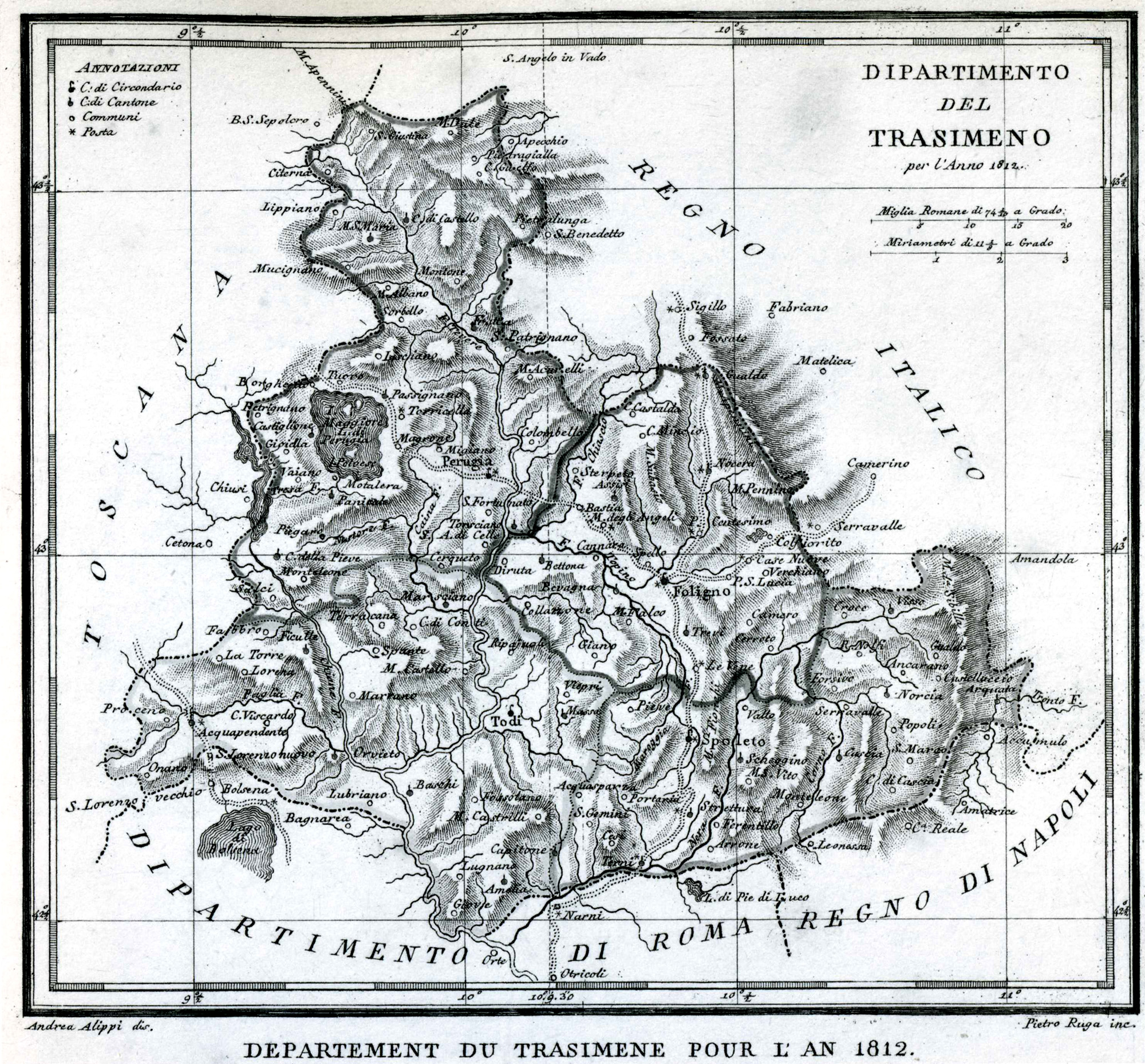
- Political subdivisions: 4 arrondissements
Preceded by	Succeeded by
Papal States	Papal States

Trasimène (French: [tʁa.si.mɛn]) was a department of the First French Empire from 1809 to 1814 in present-day Italy. It was named after Lake Trasimeno. It was formed on 15 July 1809, when the Papal States were annexed by France. Its capital was Spoleto and it roughly corresponds to the modern Italian region of Umbria.

The department was disbanded after the defeat of Napoleon in 1814. At the Congress of Vienna, the Papal States were restored to Pius VII. Its territory is now divided between the Italian provinces of Perugia, Terni, Macerata and Viterbo.

== History ==
=== Establishment ===
Following the annexation of the Papal States, the Consulta straordinaria per gli Stati Romani, active in Rome between June 1809 and December 1810, was tasked with reorganizing the territories according to the French model. On 2 August 1809 a decree established the Dipartimento del Trasimeno with its capital at Spoleto, despite local opposition from Perugia, which had long held regional pre-eminence.

The definition of mairies (communes) within this framework remained contested. Prefect Antoine-Marie Roederer reported confusion in the absence of clear instructions. While a guideline from the Minister of the Interior discouraged the creation of communes with fewer than 1,200 inhabitants, in practice local initiatives led to a proliferation of proposed communes. Rœderer also noted the difficulties of detaching ancient rural districts from their traditional urban centers, such as Perugia and Spoleto.

On 23 November 1810, shortly before its dissolution, the Consulta issued a definitive decree creating 127 communes within the Department of Trasimène. This included a division between urban and rural cantons in Perugia, Spoleto, Todi, and Terni. Roederer criticized the measure, judging it impractical, since some communes consisted only of one or two houses, an inn, or a suppressed abbey, lacking both resources and inhabitants. In 1811 he attempted to suspend implementation, citing the absence of qualified personnel and sufficient local revenues.

Nevertheless, an imperial order in February 1811 required immediate enforcement, and difficulties persisted as subprefects were unable to organize several of the newly created communes.

=== Decline ===
The final reports from the Department of Trasimène in October 1813 reflect the weakening of the Napoleonic system in central Italy. Roederer observed that while opposition figures existed, they were generally wealthy proprietors of reserved temperament, unlikely to risk open action, and the territory showed no signs of organized monarchist traditions that might support an insurrection. He believed that only if other provinces rose in revolt would the department follow, and then only reluctantly.

These final assessments coincided with widespread anticipation of the Papal restoration and reflected the declining fortunes of the Napoleonic administration in Umbria.

== Government ==
=== Subdivisions ===
The department was subdivided into the following arrondissements and cantons (situation in 1812):

- Spoleto, cantons: Arquata, Cascia, Norcia, Spoleto (2 cantons), Terni (2 cantons) and Visso.
- Foligno, cantons: Assisi, Bettona, Bevagna, Foligno, Gualdo, Montefalco, Nocera, Spello and Trevi.
- Perugia, cantons: Castiglione del Lago, Città della Pieve, Città di Castello, Fratta, Monte Santa Maria, Panicale, Passignano and Perugia (3 cantons).
- Todi, cantons: Acquapendente, Amelia, Baschi, Ficulle, Marsciano, Massa, Orvieto and Todi (2 cantons).

== Demographics ==
The population of the department in 1812 was approximately 300,000, and its area was approximately 3,357 square Italian miles (11,120 square kilometers).

=== Social groups ===
The social landscape of the department comprised several distinct groups with differing attitudes toward French rule.

The nobility was divided between pro-papal factions, hostile to the new regime, and pro-French elements who saw opportunities in cooperation. Landownership remained their principal source of wealth, and the government relied on their support to stabilize political order.

The intellectual and professional classes—lawyers, physicians, university teachers, and engineers—were fewer in number than in other regions but viewed the new regime with initial hope, soon tempered by disappointment at its moderation compared to revolutionary ideals.

Entrepreneurs in construction, commerce, and manufacturing, often of non-noble background, were economically engaged with the Napoleonic administration.

By contrast, the clergy were broadly hostile, both for ideological reasons and due to the suppression of religious orders, which dismantled networks of education and social assistance. The closure of these institutions created severe economic and social problems, acknowledged even by Roederer despite his personal hostility toward the Church.

For the wider population, survival and daily livelihood remained the primary concern during this period of political upheaval.

== Economy ==
=== Agriculture ===
Agriculture attracted frequent attention from the prefect, who criticized widespread deficiencies in 1811, including poor crop rotation, inadequate knowledge of ploughing and fertilization, ignorance of veterinary practice, and backward methods in beekeeping that destroyed hives. He considered only olive cultivation to be practiced competently, while viticulture produced mostly low-quality wines, except in the Orvieto area, and local sheep were described as weak and poorly fleeced.

Roederer promoted the introduction of new crops such as cotton, sugar beet, woad (pastel), and white silkworms. Early trials seemed promising, with cotton showing improvement after initial difficulties. By October 1812, however, unfavorable weather delayed maturation and threatened to ruin the harvest. He concluded that without the establishment of local manufacturing to process these crops, even willing landowners would lack incentives to expand production, citing the case of a sugar beet grower near Spoleto as an example.

Experiments with sugar beet cultivation following the Barruel and Isnard method reached the crystallization stage successfully, yet costs of production and limited prospects for marketing prevented expansion without larger-scale processing facilities. Similar difficulties affected the cultivation of pastel, as the absence of entrepreneurs willing to process the crop rendered the effort unprofitable. The local population resisted such innovations, limiting the diversification of agricultural production.

=== Manufacturing ===
The department's manufacturing sector was weak and largely confined to meeting local needs, producing textiles, hats, and leather goods described by the prefect as coarse and of poor quality. The spread of French consumer tastes among local elites increased demand for finer imported goods, undermining local production.

The removal of internal barriers within the French Empire further facilitated the inflow of higher-quality and cheaper products from Paris, Lyon, and other regions, manufactured with machinery unavailable in Umbria.

Efforts to modernize production often ended in failure; a manufacturer in Foligno, despite investing in expensive machinery from Paris and skilled workers from abroad, was forced to abandon his enterprise due to insurmountable costs.

=== Trade ===
The geographical position of the department between the ports of Ancona and Livorno provided theoretical advantages, but commercial activity remained limited. Traditional trade links with the Marche were disrupted after their incorporation into the Kingdom of Italy, imposing new customs barriers and severing long-established markets.

The integration of Tuscany into the French Empire also destabilized the grain trade. Normally producing only three-quarters of its needs, the department had previously relied on imports from Ancona. After the territorial changes, Umbrian grain flowed to Tuscany during winter shortages, forcing later imports at higher prices from the Marche, with a negative balance for the local economy.

Tuscan competition also undermined the once-prestigious paper mills of Foligno, which lost their dominant position in supplying the Papal States.

=== Taxation ===
==== Indirect taxation ====
The introduction of octrois in the Department of Trasimène encountered strong resistance. Under the Papal government, communal revenues relied mainly on consumption duties and taxes on households and individuals. With the imposition of imperial legislation, these older taxes had to be abolished, and the collection of consumption duties brought into line with the French system of octrois.

Prefect Antoine-Marie Roederer noted that while the two systems were similar in nature, the method of collection differed significantly. The former was levied at the point of sale, such as in taverns for wine or in butcheries for meat, which allowed landowners who produced or slaughtered privately to escape taxation, placing the burden largely on the poor. The octroi, however, was to be collected at the entry of goods into towns, compelling producers themselves to contribute. This shift threatened established privileges and provoked opposition among municipal councillors.

In 1810 Roederer limited the introduction of octrois to 17 of the largest communes, finding it impossible to establish them in all 127. Even in the larger towns, adjustments were required to tariff levels and collection methods. For smaller communes, he resorted to a compromise: budgets for 1812 were drawn up with existing local consumption duties, which he rebranded as octrois and reapproved under this title. By 1812, he experimented with subscription-based payment systems in the most rural communes, supported by a decree of 4 May 1812 extending such arrangements until January 1814. Nevertheless, communal finances remained inadequate, with revenues from octrois and supplementary land taxes far from sufficient to cover the new administrative burdens.

==== Direct Taxation ====
Direct land taxation functioned more effectively. Roederer reported in January 1812 that few departments in the empire collected direct taxes with greater accuracy than Trasimène, a result aided by relatively moderate rates. The total revenue from land taxes grew steadily: 1.26 million francs in 1810, 1.71 million in 1811, 1.80 million in 1812, with a projection of 1.84 million in 1813. This increase was tolerated by landowners, since the tax amounted to only about one-tenth of net land income. Additional revenue came from departmental surcharges, registration and stamp duties, the milling tax on grain, and the salt tax, which was set at a lower rate than under the Papal government.

== Infrastructure ==
The improvement of internal communications was considered vital for both economic development and administrative efficiency. Several towns within the same canton lacked practicable roads during winter, including Norcia with Spoleto, Orvieto with Todi, and Città di Castello with Perugia. Landowners, entrepreneurs, engineers, and rural workers all had vested interests in road construction and maintenance. While Roederer initially complained of the lack of French engineers, by 1812 he expressed appreciation for the honesty and competence of local staff, though noting deficiencies in their supervision of works.

Management of road networks faced further disruption when the imperial decree of 16 December 1811 reclassified imperial roads, leaving only four under state responsibility and transferring the burden of the others to departmental finances. Roederer convened the departmental council, which voted an extraordinary tax of 12 additional centimes on land for 13 years to fund the projects.

In 1813 the territory was served by a network of eight departmental roads, maintained at the expense of the department. The principal roads included Montefiascone–Spoleto via Orvieto and Todi; Narni–Perugia via Todi; Spoleto–Norcia via Cerreto and Triponzo; Norcia–Fabriano; Perugia–Gubbio; Rieti–San Gemini via Terni; Perugia–Città di Castello; Perugia–Città della Pieve.

Funding for the maintenance and repair of these roads was allocated for a 13-year period beginning in 1813, with an annual budget of 102,656 francs, raised through additional taxation and supplementary revenues. The routes were then described as little more than mule paths. Despite the commitment of funds, delays in authorization from Paris stalled progress, leaving contractors unpaid while they continued maintenance work.

== Military ==
By 1813 the administration of the Department of Trasimène was increasingly absorbed by demands from Paris for war-related provisions. Orders arriving from the central government prioritized the annual levies of conscripts, extraordinary requisitions of horses, supplies for soldiers’ equipment, and the dispatch of 75 young men from leading families to serve in the Guards of Honour.

Prefect Roederer reported that even landowners and influential figures, some of whom were politically opposed to the French administration, eventually participated in the search for conscripts once reminded of the potential dangers of unrest and the financial burden such instability would place upon them.

He also noted that the government’s position was strengthened by the fact that 175 young men from the most prominent families of the department were already absent, either studying in French schools or serving in the imperial guard, effectively providing a form of guarantee for the loyalty of their families.

== Culture ==
=== Media ===
The official departmental newspaper was the Giornale del Trasimeno, published in Italian between 1810 and 1813. It served as the organ of the prefecture of the department and included decrees, circulars and administrative notices alongside public speeches and commentary.

Unlike other contemporary official newspapers, which often appeared in French or bilingually, the Giornale del Trasimeno was printed entirely in Italian, though it incorporated a large number of Gallicisms.

== Under the Roman Republic ==
A department called Trasimène also briefly existed as a subdivision of the Roman Republic (1798–1799), with the same territory, but with Perugia as its capital city.
