= Christoph Meiners =

19th-century German historian and promoter of Scientific Racism

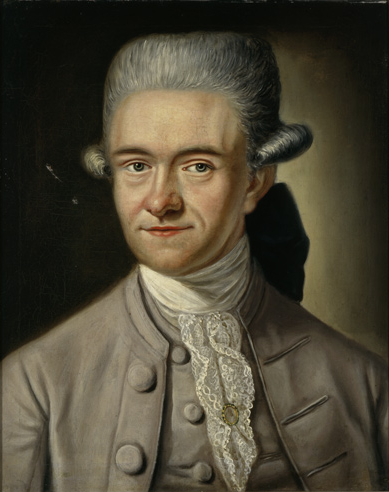
- Christoph Meiners; portrait by Johann Heinrich Tischbein the Younger (c. 1772)
- Born: 31 July 1747; Warstade
- Died: 1 May 1810 (aged 62)

Education
- Education: University of Göttingen

Philosophical work
- School: Göttingen school of history
- Institutions: University of Göttingen
- Main interests: Polygenism

Christoph Meiners (German pronunciation: [ˈkrɪstɔf ˈmaɪ̯nɐs]; 31 July 1747 – 1 May 1810) was a German racialist, philosopher, historian, and writer born in Warstade. He supported the polygenist theory of human origins. He was a member of the Göttingen school of history.

His 1785 book "The Outline of History of Mankind" was the first work in which the term "Caucasian" (German: Kaukasisch) was used in a racial sense.

== Biography ==
Christoph Meiners was born in Warstade (now a part of Hemmoor) near Otterndorf. He started at a gymnasium in Bremen in 1763, and was a student at Göttingen from 1767 to 1770. In 1772 he became extraordinary professor, and in 1775 full professor, of Weltweisheit at the University of Göttingen. From 1788 to 1791 he co-edited the anti-Kantian journal Philosophische Bibliothek. He wrote on comparative history and cultural history. He is now known mostly for his critical attitude towards Immanuel Kant, Mary Wollstonecraft and the concept of Enlightenment. He died in Göttingen. He later became the favorite intellectual ancestor of the Nazis.

== Polygenism ==
Meiners was a polygenist: he believed that each race had a separate origin. He was a very early practitioner of scientific racism. Meiners studied the physical, mental and moral characteristics of each race, and built a race hierarchy based on the evidence that was considered common in scientific and anthropological circles at the time. In Meiners's 1785 book The Outline of History of Mankind he claimed that a main characteristic of race is either beauty or ugliness. The book was the first to use the term "Caucasian" in a racial sense. He viewed only the white race as beautiful, and considered other ("ugly") races to be inferior, immoral, and animal-like. He claimed that the black, ugly peoples are distinct from the white, beautiful peoples by their sad lack of virtue and their terrible vices.

According to Meiners:

The more intelligent and noble people are by nature, the more adaptable, sensitive, delicate, and soft is their body; on the other hand, the less they possess the capacity and disposition towards virtue, the more they lack adaptability; and not only that, but the less sensitive are their bodies, the more can they tolerate extreme pain or the rapid alteration of heat and cold; when they are exposed to illnesses, the more rapid their recovery from wounds that would be fatal for more sensitive peoples, and the more they can partake of the worst and most indigestible foods ... without noticeable ill effects.

Meiners claimed the Negro felt less pain than any other race and lacked in emotions. He wrote that the Negro had thick nerves and thus was not sensitive like the other races, going as far to say that they had “no human, barely any animal feeling.” He described a scene where a Negro was condemned to death by being burned alive; halfway through the burning, the Negro asked to smoke a pipe, and continued smoking it as he was burned alive. Meiners studied the anatomy of the Negro and came to the conclusion that they were all carnivores, due to having bigger teeth and jaws than other races. He also claimed that while the skull of the Negro was larger than that of any other race, their brain was the smallest. Meiners claimed the Negro was the most unhealthy race on earth because of their poor diet, mode of living and lack of morals.

Meiners also claimed Native Americans were an inferior stock of people. He claimed that Indians cannot adapt to different climates, different types of food, or modes of life--when they are exposed to these new conditions, they lapse into a “deadly melancholy.” Meiners studied the diet of the Indians and said that they can feed off any kind of “foul offal” and that they consume huge amounts of alcohol. According to Meiners, Native Americans have extremely tough skin, as the Spanish conquerors found out when their blades apparently shattered on them.

Meiners wrote that the noblest race was the Celts, and they were able to conquer various parts of the world, were more sensitive to heat and cold and their delicacy is shown by the way they are selective about what they eat. Meiners claimed Slavs are an inferior race, "less sensitive and content with eating rough food”; he described stories of Slavs eating poisonous fungi without coming to any harm. He claimed that their medical techniques were also backwards such as the Slavs baking sick people in ovens then making them roll in the snow.

Below the Slavs are the peoples of the Middle East and Asia, all limited in intelligence and of an evil disposition, which goes together with lack of adaptability and insensitivity.

In Meiners large work entitled Researches on the variations in human nature (1815), he studied the sexology of each race and claimed that the African Negroids have unduly strong and perverted sex drives, while only white Europeans have it at appropriately lower levels.

== Works ==
- Versuch über die Religionsgeschichte der ältesten Völker besonders der Egyptier (1775)
- Geschichte des Ursprungs, Fortgangs und Verfalls der Wissenschaften in Griechenland und Rom (1781) two volumes
- Geschichte des Luxus der Athenienser von den ältesten Zeiten an bis auf den Tod Philipps von Makedonien (1782)
- Grundriß der Geschichte der Menschheit (1785)
- Beschreibung Alter Denkmäler in Allen Theilen Der Erde (1786)
- Grundriß der Theorie und Geschichte der schönen Wissenschafften (1787)
- Ueber den thierischen Magnetismus (1788)
- Aus Briefen über die Schweiz. Reisen im Sommer 1782 und 1788 (1791)
- Leben Ulrichs von Hutten (1797)
- Lebensbeschreibungen berühmter Männer aus den Zeiten der Wiederherstellung der Wissenschaften (1797) three volumes
- Beschreibung einer Reise nach Stuttgart und Strasburg im Herbste 1801 (1803)
- Allgemeine kritische Geschichte der Religionen. 2 vols (1806–7)
- Untersuchungen über die Verschiedenheiten der Menschennaturen (1813) four volumes
