= Caroline Friederike von Schlözer =

German painter (1753–1808)

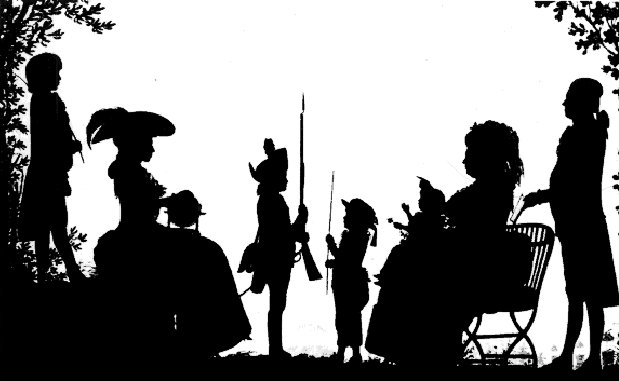
- Schlözer family portrait (1784): Caroline Frederike and August Ludwig with their five children, including Dorothea with globe
- Born: Caroline Friederike Röderer; 15 May 1753; Göttingen, Germany
- Died: 28 April 1808 (aged 54); Göttingen, Germany
- Other names: Caroline Schlözer
- Occupations: Painter, embroiderer
- Spouse: August Ludwig von Schlözer (m. 1769)
- Children: 8, including Dorothea
- Father: Johann Georg Roederer

Caroline Friederike von Schlözer (née Caroline Friederike Roederer; 15 May 1753 – 28 April 1808) was a German painter and embroiderer. She was known for her embroidered portraits of royalty, which had decorative knots that resembled paintings.

== Life and career ==
Caroline Friederike von Schlözer was born as Caroline Friederike Roederer on 15 May 1753, in Göttingen in Lower Saxony, Germany. Her mother was Elizabeth Clara Wahl, and her father was Johann Georg Roederer, a noted obstetrician. On November 5, 1769, at the age of 16, she married the historian and lawyer August Ludwig von Schlözer. They had eight children, three of whom died in infancy.

She became known throughout Europe as a painter and embroiderer. She was known for her painterly embroidered portraits and landscapes. Her embroidery had a unique stitch, similar to the "en noeuds" style of decorative knot-like stitches. In 1800 and 1806, she exhibited her embroidery work in Berlin. From 1806 to 1808, von Schlözer became an honorary member of the Prussian Academy of Arts. Some of the subjects of her portraits included the Queen of Prussia, Louise of Mecklenburg-Strelitz; and the Queen of England, Mary Tudor.

A portrait of Caroline Friederike von Schlözer was created by German painter Friedrich Carl Gröger, and is in the possessions of the Schlözer family.
