= Dorothea von Rodde-Schlözer =

German scholar (1770–1825)

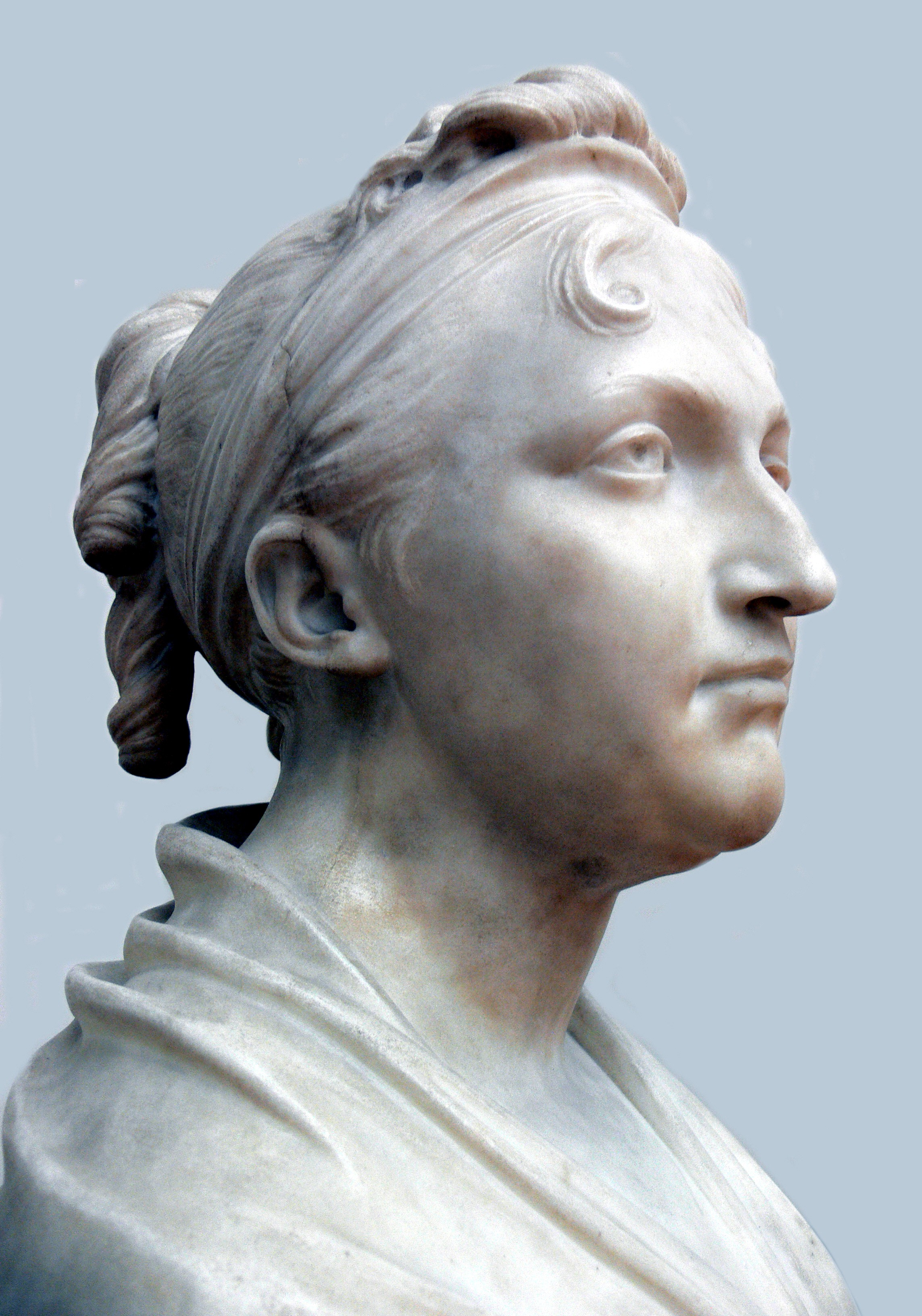
Marble Portrait bust of Dr. Dorothea von Rodde-Schlözer, by Jean-Antoine Houdon: Paris 1806

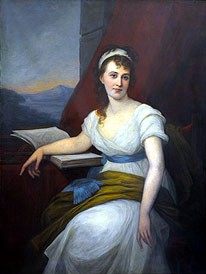
Dorothea von Rodde-Schlözer, date unknown, c. 1800

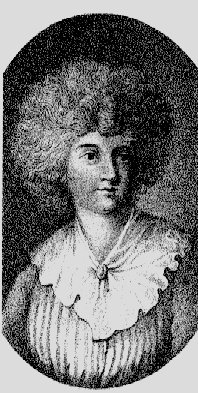
Dorothea Schlözer c. 1790

Dorothea von Rodde-Schlözer (née Dorothea Schlözer; 18 August 1770 – 12 July 1825) was a German scholar and the first woman to receive a doctor of philosophy degree in Germany. She was one of the so-called Universitätsmamsellen, a group of five academically active women during the 18th and 19th centuries, daughters of academics at Göttingen University, alongside Meta Forkel-Liebeskind, Therese Huber, Philippine Engelhard, and Caroline Schelling.

== Life ==
Dorothea was born on 18 August 1770, in Göttingen, Germany. She was the daughter of noted artist Caroline Friederike von Schlözer and professor August Ludwig Schlözer, a prominent historian and theorist on matters of education. Her father Schlözer believed that women's intelligence was equal to that of men. To settle a dispute with another professor on the effectiveness of Johann Bernard Basedow's method of education, they agreed to educate their first-born children by different methods to see how the results differed. Both children turned out to be girls. Dorothea Schlözer was given a non-Basedow regime, she had the best private tutors, and a rigorous curriculum made it possible for her to read at age four. She was also educated in several languages from an early age, and by the age of 16 she had mastered 9 languages; French, English, Dutch, Swedish, Italian, Latin, Spanish, Hebrew and Greek. She studied mathematics under professor Kästner, who was amazed at her abilities. She later studied botany, zoology, optics, religion, mining and mineralogy. In addition, she was given instruction in areas then thought to be typically female, such as playing the piano, singing, sewing, knitting, and cooking.

Women were usually not permitted to study at Göttingen University at that time, and Schlözer followed an extensive private examination by a faculty committee in the subjects of modern languages, mathematics, architecture, logic and metaphysics, classics, geography, and literature. She obtained her degree in the late 1780s.

Dorothea Schlözer differed from most learned women of the time, who were thought of as neurotic and unfashionable; Schlözer was considered much more presentable. She knew how to sew and knit and understood how to run a household well.

In 1792, she married in Lübeck a wealthy established merchant, Senator Mattheus Rodde, by whom she had three children. Henceforth, she wrote under the name of Rodde-Schlözer, the first use of the double surname in German. Their home became a centre for social and intellectual life attracting visitors from all over Germany and France.

Later in life she studied art in Paris and achieved a high standard. She was commissioned to paint a portrait of Kaiser Franz. She entered into a relationship with the French writer Charles Villers (1765–1815), in 1794, and lived semi-publicly in a ménage à trois with her husband and Villers.

In 1810, her husband's business was declared bankrupt and he went into premature senility. This blow was followed by the death of Villers and two of her children. Weak with disease herself she moved to Avignon, France, seeking a milder climate and hoping to save the life of her only surviving daughter. She died there of pneumonia in 1825, aged 55.
