= August Ludwig von Schlözer =

German historian and pedagogist (1735–1809)

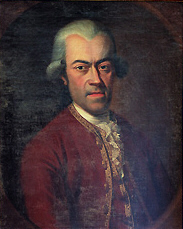
August Ludwig Schlözer, 1779

August Ludwig von Schlözer (5 July 1735, in Gaggstatt – 9 September 1809, in Göttingen) was a German historian and pedagogist who laid the foundations for the critical study of Russian medieval history. He was a member of the Göttingen school of history.

== Early career ==
August Ludwig von Schlözer was born at Gaggstatt, Hohenlohe-Kirchberg (today Kirchberg an der Jagst), Württemberg. His father, grandfather, and great-grandfather all were Protestant clergymen. In 1751, he followed them and began his studies in theology in University of Wittenberg, moving in 1754 to the increasingly renowned University of Göttingen to study history. After his studies, in 1755 he went to work as a tutor in Stockholm, where he spent a year and a half as tutor in the family of the minister of the German congregation, and during 1756/1757 in Uppsala, studying Old Norse and Gothic with the philologist Johan Ihre, then again in Stockholm as secretary of a German merchant. While in Sweden he wrote an Essay on the General History of Trade and of Seafaring in the Most Ancient Times (1758, in Swedish) on Phoenicians, which together with a publication on Swedish history made him fairly well known. In 1759, he returned to Göttingen, where he began the study of medicine.

In 1761, he went to St. Petersburg with Gerhardt Friedrich Müller, the Russian historiographer, as Müller's literary assistant and as tutor in his family. Here Schlözer learned Russian and devoted himself to the study of Russian history. In 1762, a quarrel with Müller placed him in a position of some difficulty from which he was delivered by an introduction to Count Rasumovski, who procured his appointment as adjunct to the Academy. In 1765, he was appointed by the Empress Catherine an ordinary member of the Academy and professor of Russian history. In 1767, he was elected a foreign member of the Royal Swedish Academy of Sciences.

== Return to Göttingen ==
In 1767, he left Russia on leave and did not return. He settled at Göttingen, where in 1764 he had been made professor extraordinarius, and doctor honoris causa in 1766, and in 1769 he was promoted to an ordinary professorship. Schlözer was acknowledged a brilliant professor who drew crowds of students, among whom were Arnold Heeren, Karl Friedrich Eichhorn and Johannes von Müller. Schlözer had broad interests. He translated a pedagogical piece by the Frenchman La Chalotais in 1771, as well as a travel book about Jamaica for children and an introductory work on world history (Vorbereitung zur Weltgeschichte für Kinder, 1779). Schlözer criticised harshly Johann Bernhard Basedow, a then famous pedagogue, for his education approach using games and for his separation of girls and boys education.

Schlözer's activity was enormous, and he exercised great influence by his lectures as well as by his books, bringing historical study into touch with political science generally, and using his vast erudition in an attempt to solve practical questions in the state and in society. Schlözer was interested in politics and statistics. He was a proponent of John Locke and Montesquieu. Statistics were also important to him for their informational value for government. His exchange of ideas about the study of people and society with Adam F. Kollár in Vienna helped Kollár to clarify his own approach, incorporate and broaden some of Schlözer's views and eventually coin the term ethnology and provide its first definition in 1783.

Between 1776 and 1782, he had his own political periodical: A.L. Schlözer's Briefwechsel meist historischen und politischen Inhalts (10 vols.); continued between 1782 and 1793 with the name A.L. Schlözer's Staats-Anzeigen (18 vols.) by which he produced a strong impression. This periodical criticised the German government harshly, and was widely read with up to 4400 subscribers. It was first in German to publish the declaration of human rights in 1791. In 1793, the government prohibited the publication of the Staats-Anzeigen.

Schlözer was a versatile historian giving lectures on a range of issues including Oliver Cromwell, the Dutch revolution, banks, the French Revolution (already in 1790), luxury, and the history of Germans in Romania, while continuing publishing on Russian history. His Allgemeine nordische Geschichte (General northern history), 2 vols. (Halle, 1772) was long considered a reference work on Russian history. He translated the famous Nestor Chronicle to the year 980, 5 vols. (Göttingen, 1802–1809). In 1769 he started lecturing on general world history, a topic reserved to the most educated in that time. The growing knowledge of other continents and the past posed a challenge to historians. How to compress all this information in history books in an understandable way? And what are the criteria for selecting and sorting information? In other words, scholars sought fundamental threads in history. Hundreds of articles and books addressed this question in the second half of the 18th century, drawing famous intellectuals including Herder and Schiller. Schlözer contributed to these discussions and published his Vorstellung einer Universalgeschichte in 1772. He continued to improve this piece in the following decades, until finalising the Weltgeschichte nach ihren Haupttheilen im Auszug und Zusammenhange (Main elements of world history in excerpts and context), 2 vols (2nd ed., Göttingen, 1792–1801).

== World History ==
The Weltgeschichte (World History) provides guidance for education. Parts of this piece appear unfinished and it sometimes has a halting style. Some of its ideas are outdated. However, other ideas have more substance, one of which is globally applied until today as we will see in the following. The Weltgeschichte offers insight on the state of science at that time. Schlözer tackled three challenges: the scope, the topic and the structure of a global history.

Since Schlözer opposed a strictly European perspective, the scope was the entire mankind. Moreover, he included all classes of society and social and cultural developments. The development of glass by the Phoenicians and the introduction of potatoes in Europe were more important than the names of the Chinese or German emperors.

The central topic was development and the influence of historical events on today. Schlözer identified five fundamental factors for development: "Die Lebensart bestimmt, Klima und Nahrungsart erschafft, der Herrscher zwingt, der Priester lehrt, und das Beispiel reisst fort". (Schlözer, Weltgeschichte I, 66) – "The life-style determines, climate and nutrition creates, the sovereign forces, the priest teaches, and the example inspires."

Schlözer also developed a structure for a universal history, separating it in six epochs:

- Urwelt (primeval world) – from the creation to the Flood
- Dunkle Welt (dark world) – from the flood to Moses and the first written sources
- Vorwelt (preworld) – up to the Persian Empire
- Alte Welt (old world) – up to the fall of the Roman Empire in 476 AD
- Mittelalter (Middle Ages) – up to the discovery of America by Christopher Columbus in 1492
- Neue Welt (the new world) – up to the present

This classification was not new, except for setting the Middle Ages between 476 and 1492, which he as well as his colleague and rival in Göttingen Johann Christoph Gatterer suggested roughly at the same time. These time borders for the Middle Ages are still accepted today.

Schlözer's most important innovation, however, was his suggestion to count backwards from the birth of Jesus. An incentive for this was the growing disbelief of the biblical Creation and the then generally acknowledged creation date of 3987 BC. First speculations that the Sun and the Earth were perhaps created tens of thousands of years ago emerged in the 18th century. Schlözer's suggestion offered room for further theories about the creation of the Earth. Schlözer mentioned in a footnote that he adopted this idea from foreign historians, but did not reveal them. Whoever they were, Schlözer was the one to introduce this novel chronology into the European history, an act of tremendous importance for it was the fundamental for all ancient history. According to the philosopher Hannah Arendt, this new method enabled man to look back "into an indefinite past to which one can add at will and into which we can inquire further as it stretches ahead". August Ludwig von Schlözer was instrumental in abandoning Creation beliefs of our collective consciousness, more than anybody else.

In 1804, Schlözer was ennobled by the emperor Alexander I of Russia and made a privy councillor. He retired from active work in 1805. He was much admired by the new Russian historiographer Nikolai Karamzin, while the professors Mikhail Kachenovsky and Mikhail Pogodin proclaimed themselves Schlozer's followers.

== Family life ==
Schlözer, who in 1769 married Caroline Friederike Roederer, daughter of Johann Georg Roederer (1726–1763), professor of medicine at Göttingen and body physician to the king of England, left five children. His daughter Dorothea, born on 10 August 1770, was one of the most beautiful and learned women of her time, and received in 1787 the degree of doctor. She was recognized as an authority on several subjects, especially on Russian coinage. After her marriage with Rodde, a burgomaster of Lübeck, she devoted herself to domestic duties. She died on 12 July 1825 (see Reuter, Dorothea Schlözer, Göttingen, 1887). Schlözer's son Christian (1774–1831) was a professor at Bonn, and published Anfangsgründe der Staatswirthschaft (1804–1806) and his father's Öffentliches und Privat-Leben aus Originalurkunden (1828). The youngest son, Karl von Schlözer, a merchant and Russian consul-general at Lübeck, was the father of Kurd von Schlözer (1822–1894), the historian and diplomatist, who in 1871 was appointed German ambassador to the United States and in 1882 to the Vatican, when he was instrumental in healing the breach between Germany and the papacy caused by the May Laws.

== Publications ==
- August Ludwig von Schlözer: Vorbereitung zur WeltGeschichte für Kinder. Ein Buch für Kinderlehrer. Hrsg. von Marko Demantowsky und Susanne Popp, Göttingen, 2011. ISBN 978-3-525-35844-3.
- August Ludwig von Schlözer: Hecтopъ. Russische Annalen in ihrer Slavonischen Grund–Sprache. (Göttingen, 1802–1809).

== On Schlözer ==
- Han F. Vermeulen: 'From the Field to the Study. A. L. Schlözer and the Invention of Ethnology'. In: Han F. Vermeulen: Before Boas: the Genesis of Ethnography and Ethnology in the German Enlightenment. Lincoln & London, University of Nebraska Press, 2016. ISBN 978-0-8032-5542-5
- Martin Peters: Altes Reich und Europa. Der Historiker, Statistiker und Publizist August Ludwig (v.) Schlözer (1735–1809). Lit, Münster u. a. 2003, ISBN 3-8258-6236-4 (zugl. Dissertation der Universität Marburg, 2000).

== See also ==
- Liberalism
- Contributions to liberal theory
- Human history
- Ethnography
