= Johann Christoph Gatterer =

German historian (1727–1799)

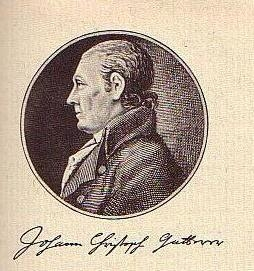
- Born: 13 July 1727; Lichtenau, Principality of Ansbach
- Died: 5 April 1799 (aged 71); Göttingen, Electorate of Hanover
- Occupation: Historian
- Known for: Göttingen school of history Nexus rerum universalis
- Relatives: Christoph Wilhelm Jacob Gatterer (son, cameralist), Magdalena Philippine Engelhard (daughter, poet)

Johann Christoph Gatterer (13 July 1727 – 5 April 1799) was a German historian who was a native of Lichtenau. He was the father of cameralist Christoph Wilhelm Jacob Gatterer (1759–1838) and poet Magdalena Philippine Engelhard (1756–1831). He was a member of the Göttingen school of history.

== Career ==
From 1747 he studied theology at the University of Altdorf, where his interest later changed to history. In 1752 he became a school teacher of history and geography in Nuremberg, and in 1756 gained his professorship in natural history. In 1759 he was appointed professor of history at the University of Göttingen, where he remained for the next forty years.

Gatterer was a pioneer of "universal history", and with fellow Göttingen historian August Ludwig von Schlözer (1735–1809) he was instrumental in developing a modern, hermeneutical approach to history. He believed that historical events needed to be systematically arranged by describing their causal relationships, rather than simply providing a chronology of events. Gatterer used the phrase nexus rerum universalis to represent "a universal connection of things in the world".

His focus dealt largely with ancillary disciplines such as genealogy, heraldry, diplomatics, and physical geography, and he treated these subjects from a modern scientific viewpoint. Gatterer promoted his ideas on these subjects in the journals Allgemeine historische Bibliothek (1767–1771) and Historisches Journal (1772–1781). Since 1954 the "Johann Christoph-Gatterer Medal" is awarded by the Genealogisch-Heraldische Gesellschaft Göttingen (GHGG) for scientific achievements in the field of genealogy and heraldry.

In 1785 Gatterer estimated that the time span from Creation to the birth of Christ to be 4181 years.

== Selected works ==
- Handbuch der neuesten Genealogie und Heraldik, 1750 – Handbook on the latest genealogy and heraldry.
- Johann Christoph Gatterers ... Abriss der Heraldik, 1766 – Outline on heraldry.
- Johann Christoph Gatterers Abriss der Chronologie, 1777 – Outline on chronology.
- Abriss der Genealogie, 1788 – Outline on genealogy.
- Johann Christoph Gatterer's Abriss der Diplomatik, 1798 – Outline on diplomatics.
- Johann Christoph Gatterer's Praktische Diplomatik, 1799 – Practical diplomatics.
