= Edward G. Mazurs =

Latvian chemist

Edward G. Mazurs (1894–1983) was a chemist who wrote a history of the periodic system of the chemical elements which is still considered a "classic book on the history of the periodic table". Originally self-published as Types of graphic representation of the periodic system of chemical elements (1957), it was reviewed by the ACS in 1958 as "the most complete survey of the range of human imagination in representing graphically the Mendeleev periodic law."

A revised "centenary" edition covering a full 100 years of periodic tables was republished under the title Graphic Representations of the Periodic System During One Hundred Years in 1974. Mazurs provided a comprehensive analysis and classification of periodic tables, listing and classifying over 700 periodic tables. He recommended Charles Janet's left-step system and suggested that it could be expanded into three dimensions.

== Life and career ==
Mazurs was born in Latvia, then under Czarist rule. He earned a master's degree at the University of Riga (later the University of Latvia), teaching there after independence as a professor of chemistry, from 1919 to 1940.

Mazurs fled with his wife and son when Latvia was reoccupied by the Soviet Union in 1944 and spent years as a refugee, some of it in a refugee camp in Regensberg, Germany. He immigrated to America in 1949. After working at Argo Corn Products, he eventually obtained a professorship at Westmont College in Santa Barbara, California.

== Publications ==
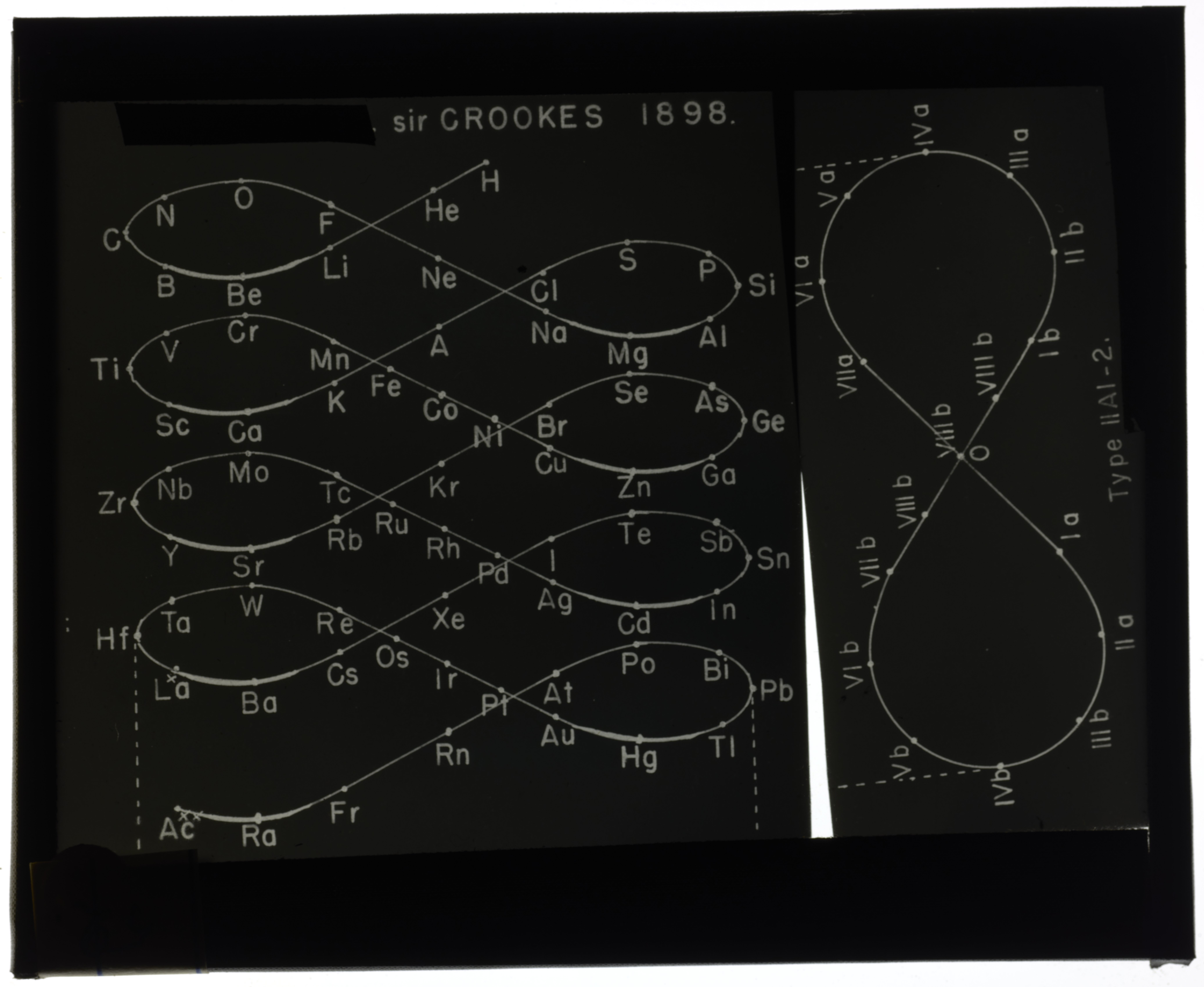
Sample illustration: Periodic table in the style of a space lemniscate by William Crookes

In a self-published book, Types of Graphic Representation of the Periodic System of the Elements (1957) he listed some 700 images published since 1862, classified under 146 heads. He brought out a greatly expanded version in 1974: Graphic Representations of the Periodic System during One Hundred Years.

Mazurs's books are difficult to use because the references are divided into 146 corresponding sections, and the index refers to the types and not to pages. Nevertheless, his references are the most comprehensive and accurate ever compiled for the period covered. He cited authors writing in at least 24 languages and from fifty countries.

Working before the age of the photocopier, he copied his illustrations by hand and generally brought them up to date by adding elements missing from the original works, and sometimes he changed them radically. He gave 67 references to the modern standard medium long table, but paid it little attention, attributing its origin to Dmitri Mendeleev, who gave only a fragmentary description of it because he disliked interrupted series. Mazurs preferred tables based on electronic structure, notably that of Charles Janet and his own modification of it.

== Papers ==
His notes and papers are held in the library of the Science History Institute, 315 Chestnut Street, Philadelphia, Pennsylvania 19106, where they occupy 4 linear feet, and include lantern slides and transparencies of periodic tables which appear in his books.

== Periodic tables ==
Year	Creator(s)	Figure numbers & types (1957 edition)
1790	Louis-Bernard Guyton de Morveau, Antoine Lavoisier, Claude Louis Berthollet, Antoine François, comte de Fourcroy	3 Table
1830	Jean-Baptiste Dumas	4 Table
1830	Johann Wolfgang Döbereiner	5 Table
1840	Leopold Gmelin	6 V-shape
1860	Julius Lothar Meyer	7 Table
1863	Alexandre-Émile Béguyer de Chancourtois	8 Table
1863	Alexandre-Émile Béguyer de Chancourtois & John Alexander Reina Newlands	10 Table; 21 Tables of the Laws of Octaves
1864	William Odling	11 Table
1865	John Alexander Reina Newlands	9 Table; 22 1C1-1
1867/1869	Gustavus Detlef Hinrichs	12 Table
1868/1895	Julius Lothar Meyer	13 Table
1869	Dmitri Mendeleev	14, 15, 16, 17 Table; 42 IIC1-1; 53 IIC2-3; 54 IIC2-4; 62 IIC1-1A; 79 IIIC3-5
1870	Dmitri Mendeleev	18, 20, Table; 24, 1C2-1
1870	Heinrich Adolph Baumhauer	29 1B2-4
1871	Dmitri Mendeleev	19 Table; 47 IIC2-1
1882	Thomas Bayley	82 IIIC3-6
1883	Heinrich Friedrich Gretschel 1830–1892 & Georg Bornemann, 1855–	30 1C2-4
1884	Ernst Huth	32 1B2-5
1885	Karl Arnold 1853–1929	33 1C2-5
1886	James Emerson Reynolds 1844–1920	44 IICI-2
1886	Thomas Carnelley 1854–1890	59 IIC2-7
1887	Flavian Mikhailovich Flavitskii 1848–1917	41 IIBI-1
1889	Victor von Richter	26 1C2-2
1892	William T. Preyer	27 1C2-2B
1892	Henry Bassett, Sr.	34 1A3-1; 68 IIIC3-1
1898	William Crookes	43 IIAI-2
1900	George F. Horsley	57 IIC2-5B
1900	Karl Schirmeisen	69 IIIA3-2
1905	Frank Austin Gooch & Claude Frederic Walker	70 IIIA3-2A
1905	Alfred Werner	75 IIIC3-3
1906	George Woodiwiss	50 IIC2-2
1910	J. F. Tocher	52 IIB2-3
1911	Benjamin Kendall Emerson	45 IIA2-1; 46 IIB2-1
1911	Eduard von Stackelberg	51 IIA2-3
1911	Antonius van den Broek	56 IIC2-5A
1911	Curt Schmidt	80 IIIC3-5A
1913	Johannes Robert Rydberg	63 IIIB2-1
1914	Arthur Alphonzo Blanchard & Frank Bertram Wade	28 1C2-3
1914	Frederick Soddy	48 IIA2-2
1915	Alois Bilecki	64 IIIA2-2
1916	William Draper Harkins & R. E. Hall	31 1A2-5
1916	Hugo Stintzing	65 IIIA3-1; 66 IIIB3-1
1918	J. G. Vogel	38 1A3-2
1918	Curt Schmidt	55 IIC2-5
1920	George Schaltenbrand	85 IIIA4-1
1922	Eugenio Saz	72 IIIC3-2
1925	Andreas von Antropoff	60 IIC2-7A
1926	Andreas von Antropoff	83 IIIC3-6A
1926	C. J. Monroe & W. D. Turner	86 IIIB4-1
1926	Luigi Rolla & Giorgio Piccardi	91 IIIC4-2A
1927	John David Main Smith	23 1C1-2
1927	Charles Janet	76 IIIC3-4
1928	Charles Janet	67 IIIB3-1C; 71 IIIB3-2; 74 IIIB3-2; 87 IIIB4-1A
1928	O. J. Stewart	25 1B2-2
1930	Roy Gardner & Arrigo Mazzucchelli	92 IIIC4-2B
1931	C. H. Douglas Clark (Cecil Henry)	90 IIIC4-2
1932	F. M. Shemyakin	36 1C3-1
1935	Nicholas Opolonick	61 IIIB1-1
1936	Egon Wiberg 1901–1976	58 IIC2-6
1937	Emil V. Zmaczynski	84 IIIC3-6B
1938	Robert A. Steinberg	95 IIIC4-3
1941	L. Sibaiya	94 IIIB4-3
1942	Friedrich Kipp	49 IIB2-2
1943	G. Haenzel	93 IIIA4-3
1948	George A. Scherer	73 IIIA3-3
1948	David T. Gibson	88 IIIC4-1
1949	G. M. Murashov	40 1C3-2A
1950	Frank O. Green & Bernard G. Jackson	35 1B3-1
1951	I. Aucken	81 IIIA3-6
1953	Gil Chaverri Rodríguez	89 IIIC4-1C
1954	A.I. Mashentsev	37 1C3-1A
1955	Edward G. Mazurs	77 IIIC3-4C; 78 IIIC3-4B
1956	Edward G. Mazurs	39 1C3-2
