= Types of periodic tables =

Different forms of the table of elements

Theodor Benfey's arrangement is an example of a continuous (spiral) table. First published in 1964, it explicitly showed the location of lanthanides and actinides. The elements form a two-dimensional spiral, starting from hydrogen, and folding their way around two peninsulas, the transition metals, and lanthanides and actinides. A superactinide peninsula is already slotted in.: Alkali metal Alkaline earth metal Lanthanide; Actinide; Transition metal / Post-transition metal Metalloid; Polyatomic nonmetal Diatomic nonmetal Noble gas

Since Dimitri Mendeleev formulated the periodic law in 1871, and published an associated periodic table of chemical elements, authors have experimented with varying types of periodic tables for teaching, aesthetic or philosophical purposes.

Earlier, in 1869, Mendeleev had mentioned different layouts including short, medium, or even cubic forms. It appeared to him that the latter (three-dimensional) form would be the most natural approach but that "attempts at such a construction have not led to any real results". (Note: Van den Broek (1911) constructed a "cubic" table of dimensions three elements deep, eight across and five deep. It was not successful.) On spiral periodic tables, "Mendeleev...steadfastly refused to depict the system as [such]...His objection was that he could not express this function mathematically."

== Typology ==
In 1934, George Quam, a chemistry professor at Long Island University, New York, and Mary Quam, a librarian at the New York Public Library compiled and published a bibliography of 133 periodic tables using a five-fold typology: I. short; II. long (including triangular); III. spiral; IV. helical, and V. miscellaneous.

In 1952, Therald Moeller expressed disdain as to the many types of periodic table:

The literature is replete with suggested (and discarded) modifications of the M periodic table. In fact so many modifications have appeared that one is tempted to conclude that practically every author has his [sic] own concept of what a workable arrangement must be. Unfortunately, the majority of the tabulations proposed are either unwieldy or utterly worthless, and only a few valuable suggestions have been made. Geometry does not permit of an arrangement which is sufficiently ideal to serve all the required purposes equally well. Thus the many three-dimensional models, embracing globes, helices, cones, prisms, castles, etc., are interesting but lacking in utility. To a lesser extent, the more involved two-dimensional arrangements do little toward solving the difficulty, and essentially the only suggestions as to modifications which are truly constructive are those centering in reflection of electronic configurations.

Certainly the most useful of these modifications, and at the same time one of the earliest to be proposed, is the so-called long or [18-column]...table.

In 1954, Tomkeieff referred to the three principal types of periodic table as helical, rectilinear, and spiral. He added that, "unfortunately there also a number of freaks".

In 1974 Edward Mazurs, a professor of chemistry, published a survey and analysis of about seven hundred periodic tables that had been published in the preceding one hundred years; he recognized short, medium, long, helical, spiral, series tables, and tables not classified.

In 1999 Mark Leach, a chemist, inaugurated the INTERNET database of Periodic Tables. It has over 1300 entries as of December 2025. (Note: In contrast, Walden reported in 1908 that [only] more than a hundred different periodic tables had already been published.) While the database is a chronological compilation, specific types of periodic tables that can be searched for are spiral and helical; 3-dimensional; and miscellaneous.

For convenience, periodic tables may be typified as either: 1. short; 2. triangular; 3. medium; 4. long; 5. continuous (circular, spiral, lemniscate, or helical); 6. folding; or 7. spatial. Tables that defy easy classification are counted as type 8. unclassified.

=== Short ===
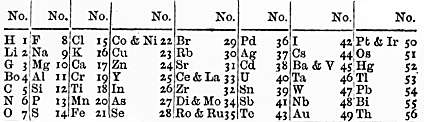
Newlands's 1866 table of octaves

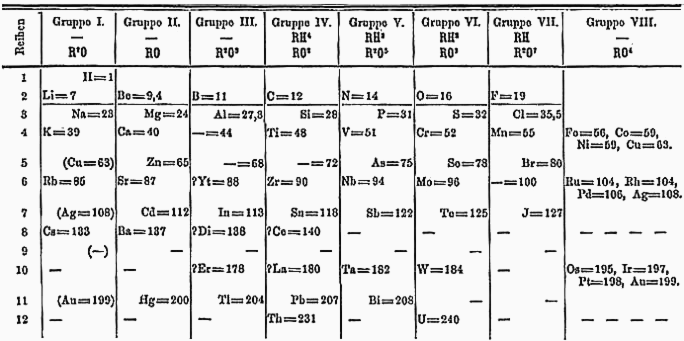
Mendeleev's 1871 periodic table

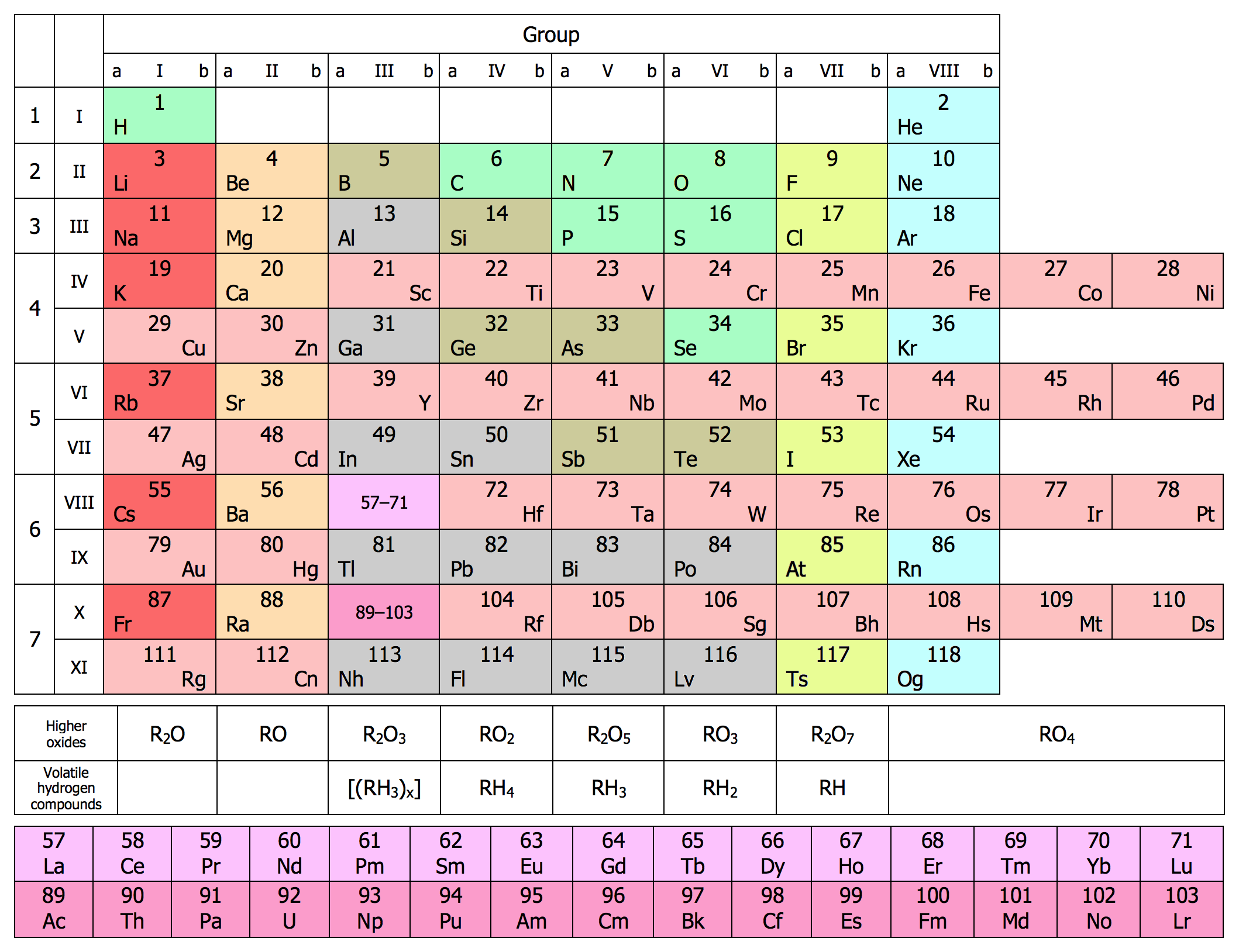
Modern form of a short eight-group periodic table: Alkali metals Alkaline earth metals Lanthanides; Actinides; Transition metals / Post-transition metals Metalloids; Unclassified nonmetals (Note: These elements are generally regarded as being too diverse to merit a collective classification and, in this context, have been referred to as other nonmetals or, more plainly, as nonmetals, located between the metalloids and the halogens.); Halogens; Noble gases

Short tables have around eight columns. This form became popular following the publication of Mendeleev's eight-column periodic table in 1871.

Also shown in this section is a modernized version of the same table.

Mendeleev and others who discovered chemical periodicity in the 1860s had noticed that when the elements were arranged in order of their atomic weights there was as an approximate repetition of physiochemical properties after every eight elements. Consequently, Mendeleev organized the elements known at that time into a table with eight columns. He used the table to predict the properties of then unknown elements. While his hit rate was less than 50%, it was his successes that propelled the widespread acceptance of the idea of a periodic table of the chemical elements. The eight-column style remains popular to this day, most notably in Russia, Mendeleev's country of birth.

An earlier attempt by John Newlands, an English chemist, to present the nub of the same idea to the London Chemical Society, in 1866, was unsuccessful; members were less than receptive to theoretical ideas, as was the British tendency at the time. He referred to his idea as the Law of Octaves, at one point drawing an analogy with an eight-key musical scale.

John Gladstone, a fellow chemist, objected on the basis that Newlands's table presumed no elements remained to be discovered. "The last few years had brought forth thallium, indium, caesium, and rubidium, and now the finding of one more would throw out the whole system." He believed that there was as close an analogy between the metals named in the last vertical column as in any of the elements standing on the same horizontal line.

Fellow English chemist Carey Foster humorously inquired of Newlands whether he had ever examined the elements according to the order of their initial letters. Foster believed that any arrangement would present occasional coincidences, but he condemned one which placed so far apart manganese and chromium, or iron from nickel and cobalt.

The advantages of the short form of periodic table are its compact size and that it shows the relationships between main-group elements and transition-metal groups.

Its disadvantages are that it appears to group dissimilar elements, such as chlorine and manganese, together; the separation of metals and nonmetals is hard to discern; there are "inconsistencies in the grouping together of elements giving colorless, diamagnetic ions with elements giving colored, paramagnetic ions; and [a] lack of reasonable positions for hydrogen, the lanthanide elements, and the actinide elements".

Some other notable short periodic tables include:

- 1862 — Meyer's system: 28 elements in 6 columns
- 1895 — Retger's Periodic Table: Intraperiodic accommodation of the rare earths (a)
- 1902 — Brauner's table: Intraperiodic accommodation of the rare earths (b)
- 1906 — Mendeleev's table: with six supposedly missing elements between H and He
- 1919 — Hackh's table, with 9 columns in the top half and 11 in the bottom half. The position of an element in the table determines its properties. (Note: Hackh's table is shown in the gallery as "Short (9/11 columns)".)
- 1923 — Deming's other table: Mendeleev style with dividing line between metals and nonmetals
- 1924 — Hubbard chart of atoms: American classic
- 1935 — Rysselberghe's table: Separated blocks
- 1945 — Krafft's table: Ten groups
- 1950 — Sidgwick's classification (Mendeleeff): Lanthanides collocated; actinides fragmented
- 1960 — International Rectifier Corporation table: Rainbow style
- 1975 — Shukarev's system: Transition metals turn back on themselves
- 2011 — Tresvyatskii's table: Assignment of lanthanides and actinides to groups

=== Triangular ===
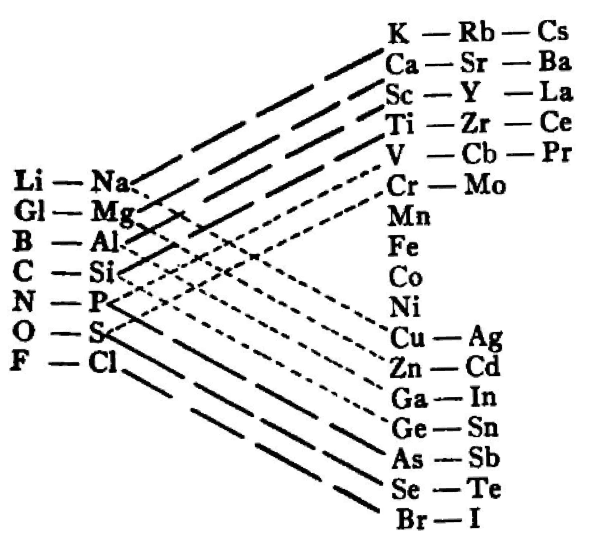
A rendering of Bayley's periodic table of 1882

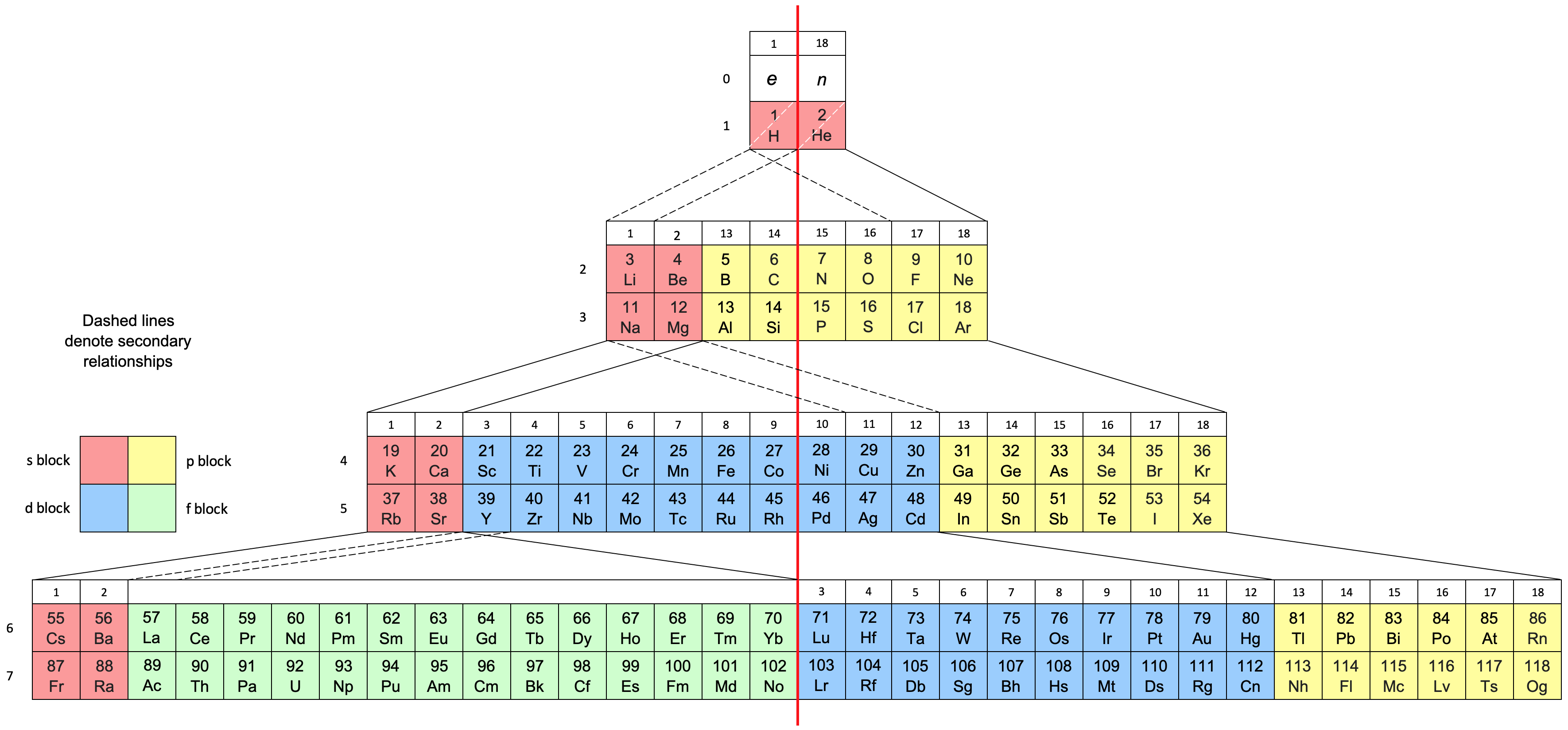
A redrawn version of Kapustinsky's triangular or step pyramid periodic table (1953). Period 0 includes the electron and neutron. Each period repeats once. Two kinds of bilateral symmetry are present: shape; and metals and nonmetals in each half.

Triangular tables have column widths of 2-8-18-32 or thereabouts. An early example, appearing in 1882, was provided by Bayley.

Through the use of connecting lines, such tables make it easier to indicate analogous properties among the elements.

In some ways they represent a form intermediate between the short and medium tables, since the average width of the fully mature version (with widths of 2+8+18+32 = 60) is 15 columns.

An early drawback of this form was to make predictions for missing elements based on considerations of symmetry. For example, Bayely considered the rare earth metals to be indirect analogues of other elements such as, for example, zirconium and niobium, a presumption which turned out to be largely unfounded.

Advantages of this form are its aesthetic appeal, and relatively compact size; disadvantages are its width, the fact that it is harder to draw, and interpreting certain periodic trends or relationships may be more challenging compared to the traditional rectangular format.

Some other notable triangular periodic tables include:

- 1895 — Thomsen's systematic arrangement: Electropositive and electronegative elements labelled
- 1911 — Adam's table: Separation of lanthanides (left) and radioactives (right)
- 1922 — Bohr's system: Based on modern atomic theory
- 1935 — Zmaczynski's table: Period 0 above H-He
- 1949 — Antropoff's representation revised by Fritz Scheele: Lanthanides and actinides included in main body
- 1952 — Coryell's table: Bifurcating groups limited to 3 and 13
- 1953 — Kapustinsky's table: Electron and neutron added to period 0; each period repeats once. There is a secondary diagonal relationship between the neutron (which decays to a proton, electron and antineutrino), and hydrogen.
- 1967 — Sanderson's table: 2-8-10-14 stacked periods
- 1987 — Step-pyramid form of the periodic chart: Modernised version of 1882 Bayley
- 1989 — Seaborg's electron shell table: Up to Z = 168
- 1995 — Klein's table: Breaks at the start of each new block
- 2023 — Marks's snub-triangular version of Mendeleyev's 1869 table: First tier has sp elements rather than H and He alone

=== Medium ===
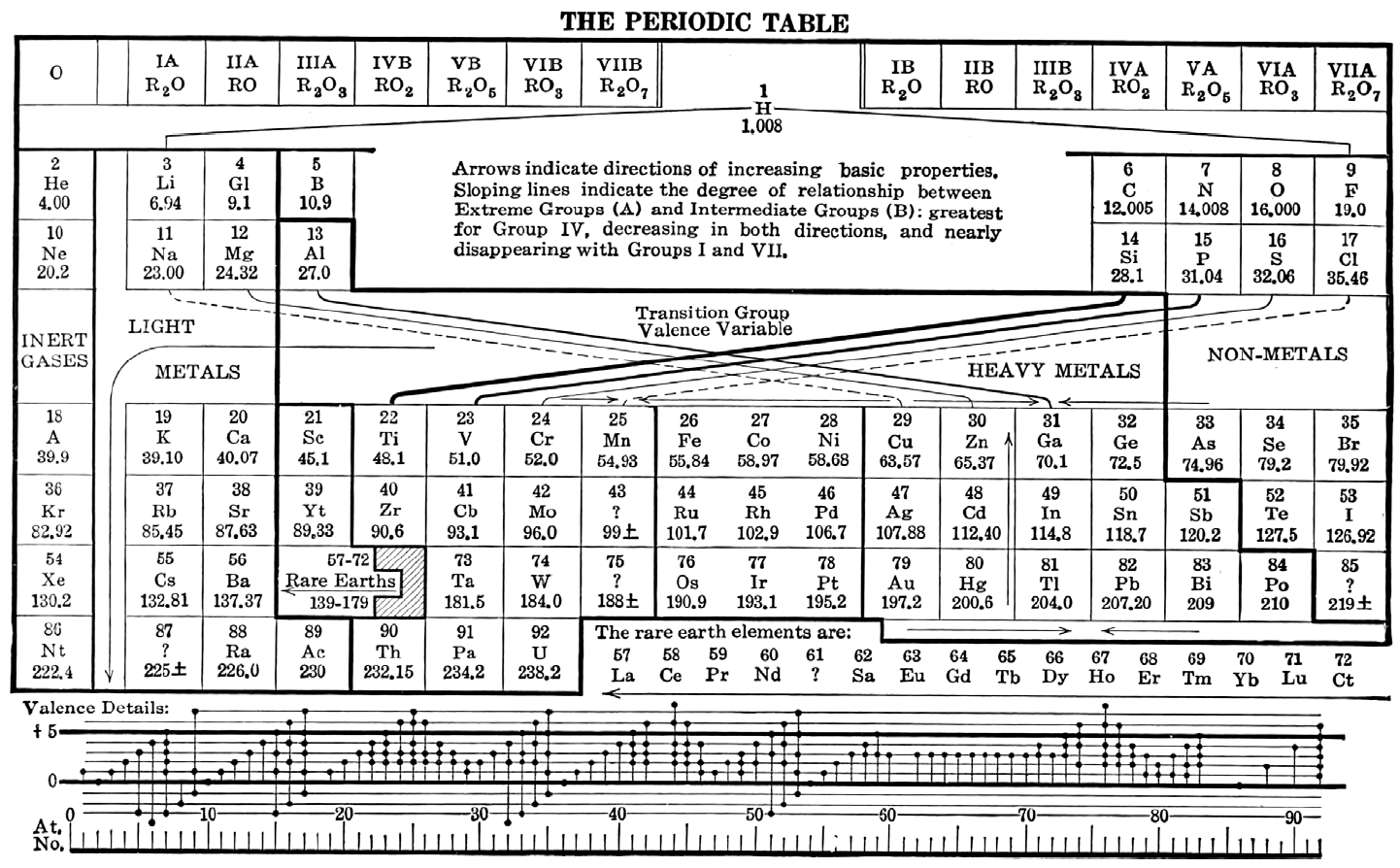
Deming's periodic table of 1923

A modern periodic table colour-coded to show some common or more commonly used names for sets of elements. The categories and their boundaries differ somewhat between sources. Lutetium and lawrencium in group 3 are also transition metals.: Alkali metals Alkaline earth metals Lanthanides; Actinides; Transition metals / Post-transition metals Metalloids; Unclassified nonmetals (Note: These elements are generally regarded as being too diverse to merit a collective classification and, in this context, have been referred to as other nonmetals or, more plainly, as nonmetals, located between the metalloids and the halogens.); Halogens; Noble gases

Medium tables have around 18 columns. The popularity of this form is thought to be a result of it having a good balance of features in terms of ease of construction and size, and its depiction of atomic order and periodic trends.

Deming's version of a medium table, which appeared in the first edition of his 1923 textbook "General Chemistry: An Elementary Survey Emphasizing Industrial Applications of Fundamental Principles", has been credited with popularizing the 18-column form. (Note: An antecedent of Deming's 18-column table may be seen in Adams' 16-column Periodic Table of 1911. Adams omits the rare earths and the "radioactive elements" (i.e. the actinides) from the main body of his table and instead shows them as being "careted in only to save space" (rare earths between Ba and eka-Yt; radioactive elements between eka-Te and eka-I). See: Elliot Q. A. (1911). "A modification of the periodic table". Journal of the American Chemical Society. 33(5): 684–88 [687].)

LeRoy referred to Deming's table, "this...being better known as the 'eighteen columns'-form" as representing "a very marked improvement over the original Mendeleef type as far as presentation to beginning classes is concerned."

Merck and Company prepared a handout form of Deming's table, in 1928, which was widely circulated in American schools. By the 1930s his table was appearing in handbooks and encyclopedias of chemistry. It was also distributed for many years by the Sargent-Welch Scientific Company.

The advantages of the medium form are that it correlates the positions of the elements with their electronic structures, accommodates the vertical, horizontal and diagonal trends that characterise the elements, and separates the metals and nonmetals; its disadvantages are that it obscures the relationships between main group elements and transition metals.

Some other notable medium tables include:

- 1893 — Rang's 17-column table: Forerunner of the modern 18-column table
- 1920 — Stewart's arrangement: The lanthanides accommodated in its 18 columns
- 1945 — Seaborg's table: Suggested an actinide series to complement the lanthanides
- 1956 — Remy's "long" period form: Uranides competing with Seaborg's actinides
- 1976 — Seaborg's futuristic table: Elements up to Z = 168
- 1980 — Jodogne's tableau: Upside down
- 1990 — IUPAC Red Book table: 15-wide f-block
- 2002 — Inorganic chemist's table: Major and minor patterns indicated.
- 2006 — Scerri's table: Symmetrical

=== Long ===
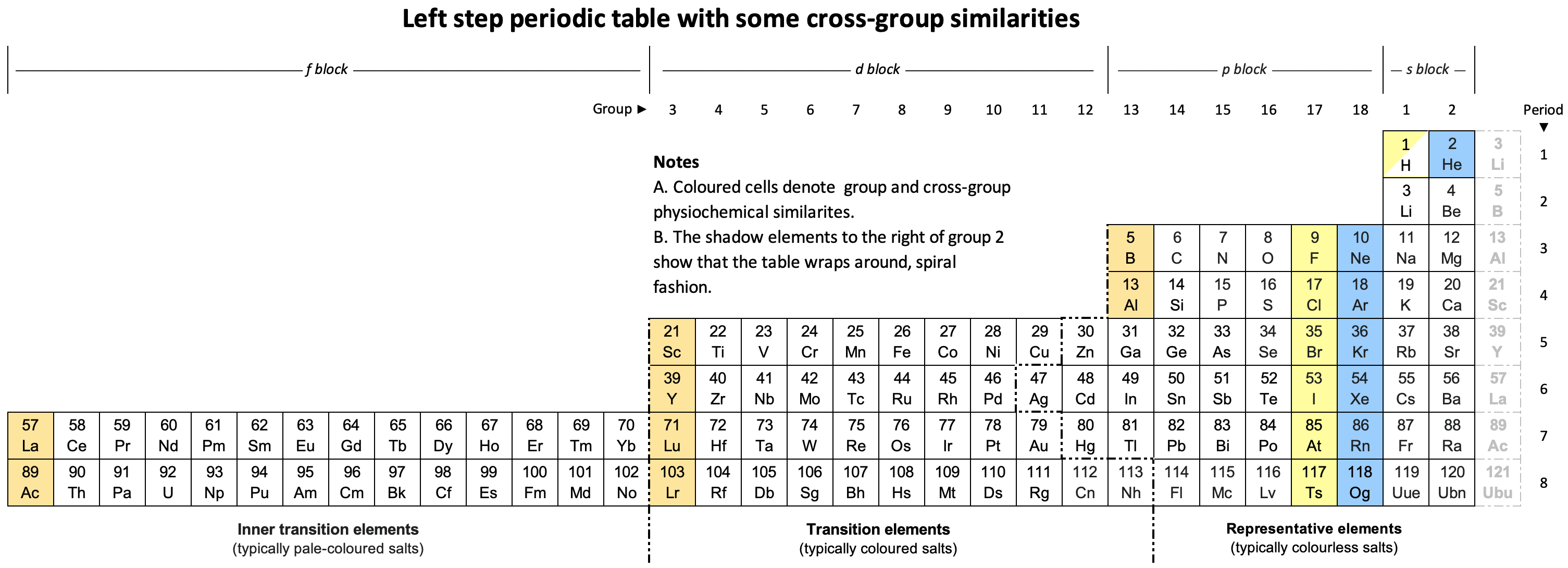
Left step periodic table with 33rd shadow column showing that the periods wrap around

The blocks in this long table follow the conventional order: s-, f-, d- and p-

Long tables have around 32 columns. Early examples are given by Bassett (1892), with 37 columns arranged albeit vertically rather than horizontally; Gooch & Walker (1905), with 25 columns; and by Werner (1905), with 33 columns.

In the first image in this section, of a so-called left step table:

- Groups 1 and 2 (the s-block) have been moved to the right side of the table.
- The s-block is shifted up one row, thus all elements not in the s-block are now one row lower than in the standard table. For example, most of the fourth row in the standard table is the fifth row in this table.
- Helium is placed in group 2 (not in group 18).

The elements remain positioned in order of atomic number (Z).

The left step table was developed by Charles Janet, in 1928, originally for aesthetic purposes. That being said it shows a reasonable correspondence with the Madelung energy ordering rule this being a notional sequence in which the electron shells of the neutral atoms in their ground states are filled.

A more conventional long form of periodic table is included for comparison.

The advantage of the long form is that shows where the lanthanides and actinides fit into the periodic table; its disadvantage is its width.

Some other notable long tables include:

- 1892 — Bassett's vertical arrangement: 37 columns sideways
- 1905 — Gooch & Walker's system: 25 columns
- 1905 — Werner's arrangement: 33 groups
- 1927 — LeRoy's table: Left step precursor; three sets of transition elements
- 1928 — Corbino's right-step table: No gaps between elements
- 1934 — Romanoff's system: First long form with actinides under lanthanides (including a split d-block)
- 1964 — Ternstrom's A periodic table: A triple-combo table drawing on the advantages of the complete block system according to Werner (1905) and a horizontal Bohr line-system; the outcome resembles the left step form of Janet (1928)
- 1982 — Periodiska systems rätta form: Left step variation with novel placement of H-He
- 2002 — Tabla Periódica de Los Elementos Químicos-Forma Armonica - Sistema A-2 (Periodic Table of Chemical Elements-Harmonic Form): Left step variation in which groups 1 and 2 are redistributed
- 2018 — Beylkin's table: Symmetrical table with lanthanides and actinides incorporated

=== Continuous ===
A circular periodic table

Encompassing circular, spiral, lemniscate, or helical tables.

Crookes's lemniscate periodic table, shown in this section, has the following elements falling under one another:

H	He	Li	Gl	B	C	N	O	F	Na	Mg	Al	Si	P	S
Cl	Ar	K	Ca	Sc	Ti	V	Cr	Mn·Fe·Ni·Co	Cu	Zn	Ga	Ge	As	Se
Br	Kr	Rb	Sr	Yt	Zr	Nb	Mo	Rh·Ru·Pd	Ag	Cd	In	Sn	Sb	Te
I	–	Cs	Ba	La	Ce	( )	( )	( )	( )	( )	( )	( )	( )	( )
( )	–	( )	( )	( )	( )	Ta	W	Ir·Pt·Os	( )	( )	( )	( )	( )	( )
–	–	–	–	–	Th	–	Ur	–	–	–	–	–	–	–

The collocation of manganese with iron, nickel and cobalt is later seen in the modernised version of von Bichowsky's table of 1918, in the unclassified section of this article.

A continuous two-dimensional periodic pyramid

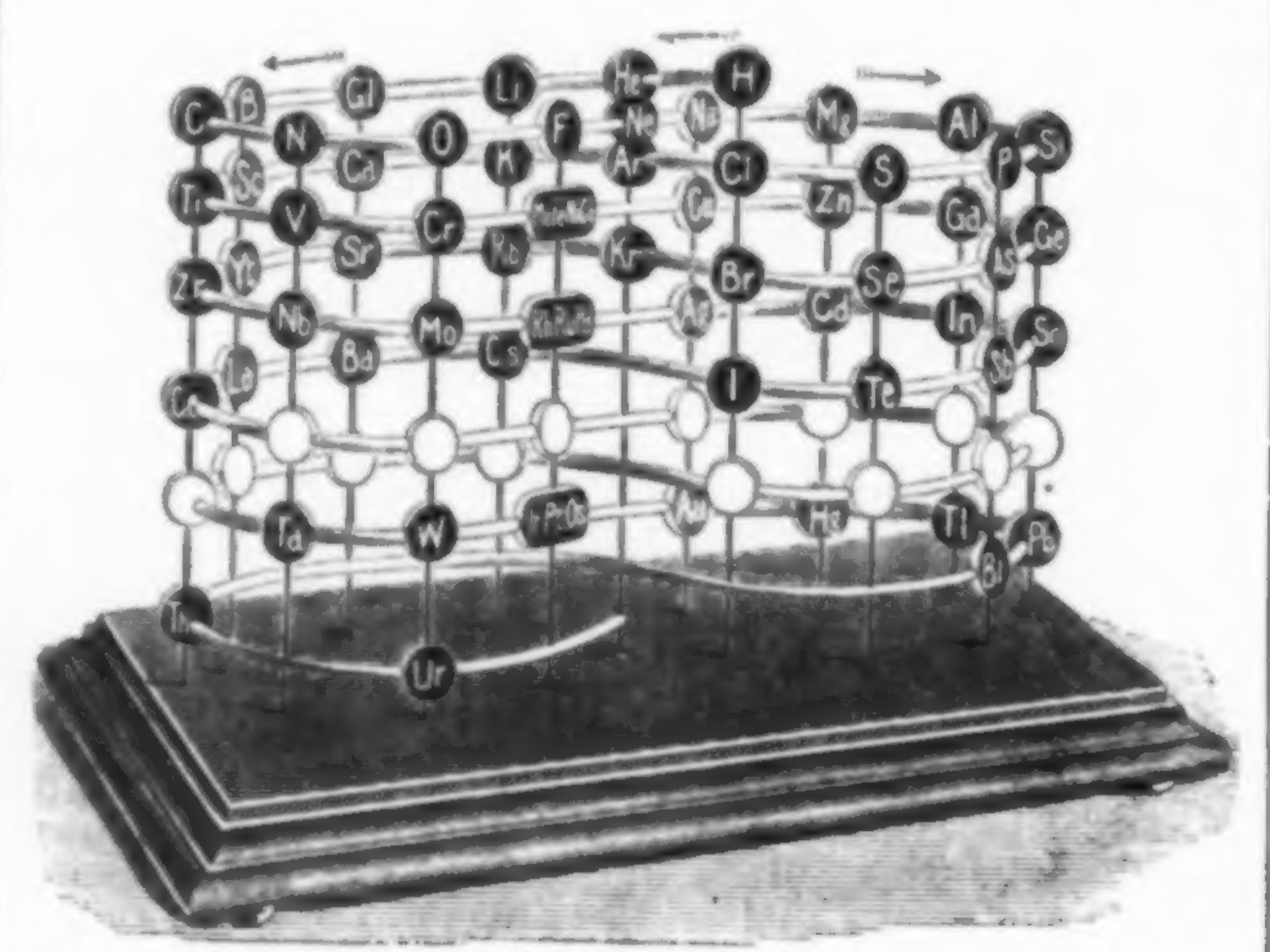
Crookes's lemniscate (figure eight) periodic table of 1898

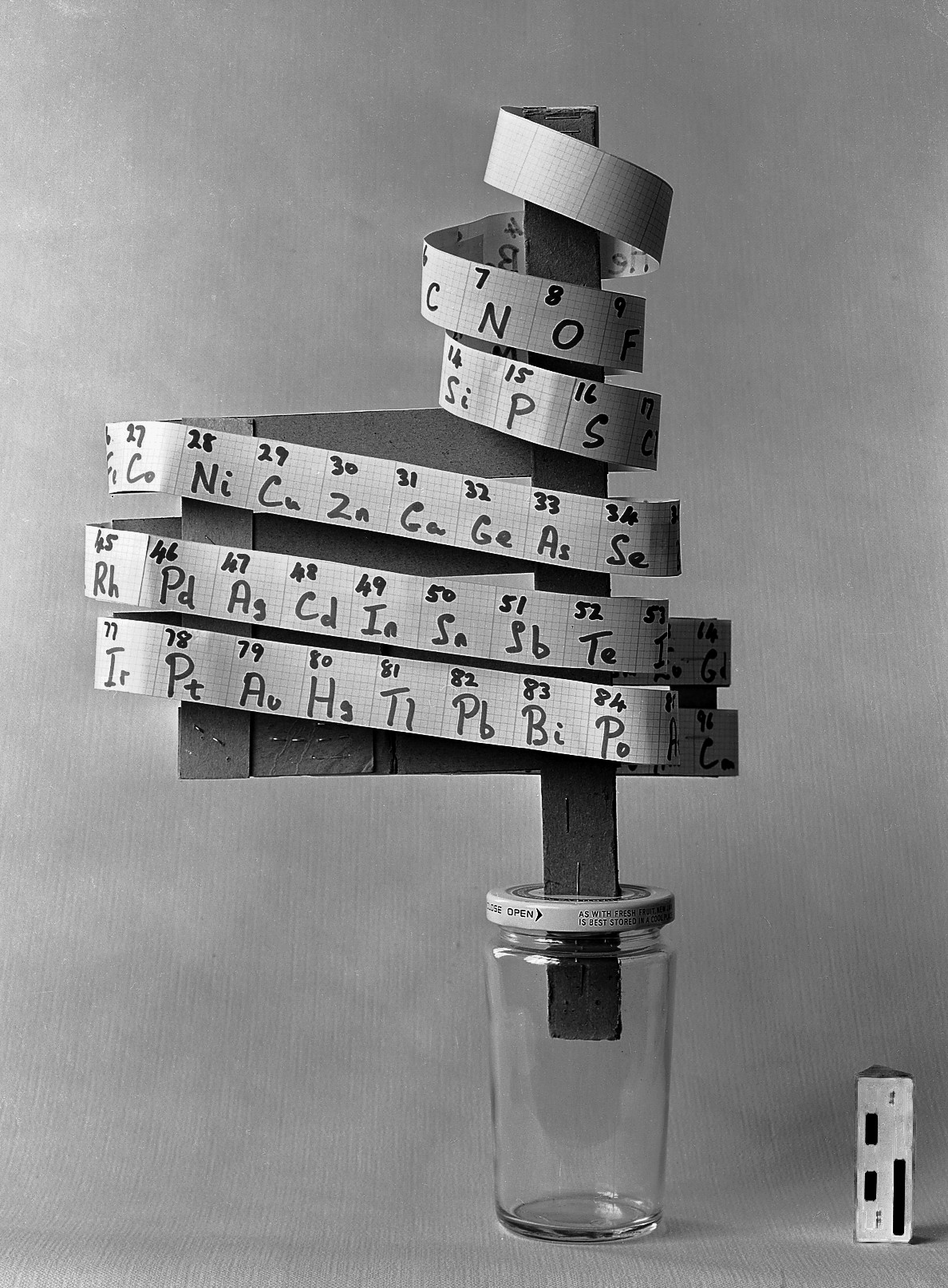
A helical table

The French geologist Alexandre-Émile Béguyer de Chancourtois was the first person to make use of atomic weights to produce a classification of periodicity. He drew the elements as a continuous spiral around a metal cylinder divided into 16 parts. The atomic weight of oxygen was taken as 16 and was used as the standard against which all the other elements were compared. Tellurium was situated at the centre, prompting vis tellurique, or telluric screw.

The advantage of this form is that it emphasizes, to a greater or lesser degree, that the elements form a continuous sequence; that said, continuous tables are harder to construct, read and memorize than the traditional rectangular form of periodic table.

Some other notable forms of continuous periodic tables include:

- 1867 — Hinrichs's programme of atomechanics: Captures many of the primary periodic relationships seen in the modern table while not being cluttered by attempts to show secondary relationships
- 1886 — Shepard's natural classification: A spiral form with instructions for turning it into a tube
- 1905 — Gooch & Walker's primary, secondary, and tertiary series of elements: An early depiction of double periodicity among the Ln
- 1914 — Hackh's periodic table: First spiral to take account of Mosley's atomic numbers, and the first to show successively larger pairs of coils. Also interesting as H stands alone in the centre
- 1925 — Courtines's a model of the periodic table: A helix with the appearance of a submarine or a castle
- 1939 — Irwin's periodic table: Extensive analysis of periodicity patterns
- 1940 — Gamow [first] ribbon periodic table: Noble gases as Group 0
- 1965 — Alexander arrangement of elements: Designed to complement the point at which education on the arrangement of atoms into a chart begins, much as the world globe establishes the reality, and to emphasise the vital and convenient nature of flat printed projections or maps
- 1999 — Moran's spiral periodic table: In hexagonal form
- 2003 — Chemical galaxy II: Starry pathway to link the elements, express the astronomical reach of chemistry, stimulate the imagination and evoke wonder at the order underlying the universe
- 2010 — Harrison Spiral Periodic Table: The organisation of the elements closely follows H. G. Deming's 1923 Periodic Table where A B numeration was first utilized to correspond the characteristic oxides of the 'B' groups to those of the 'A' groups.

=== Folding ===
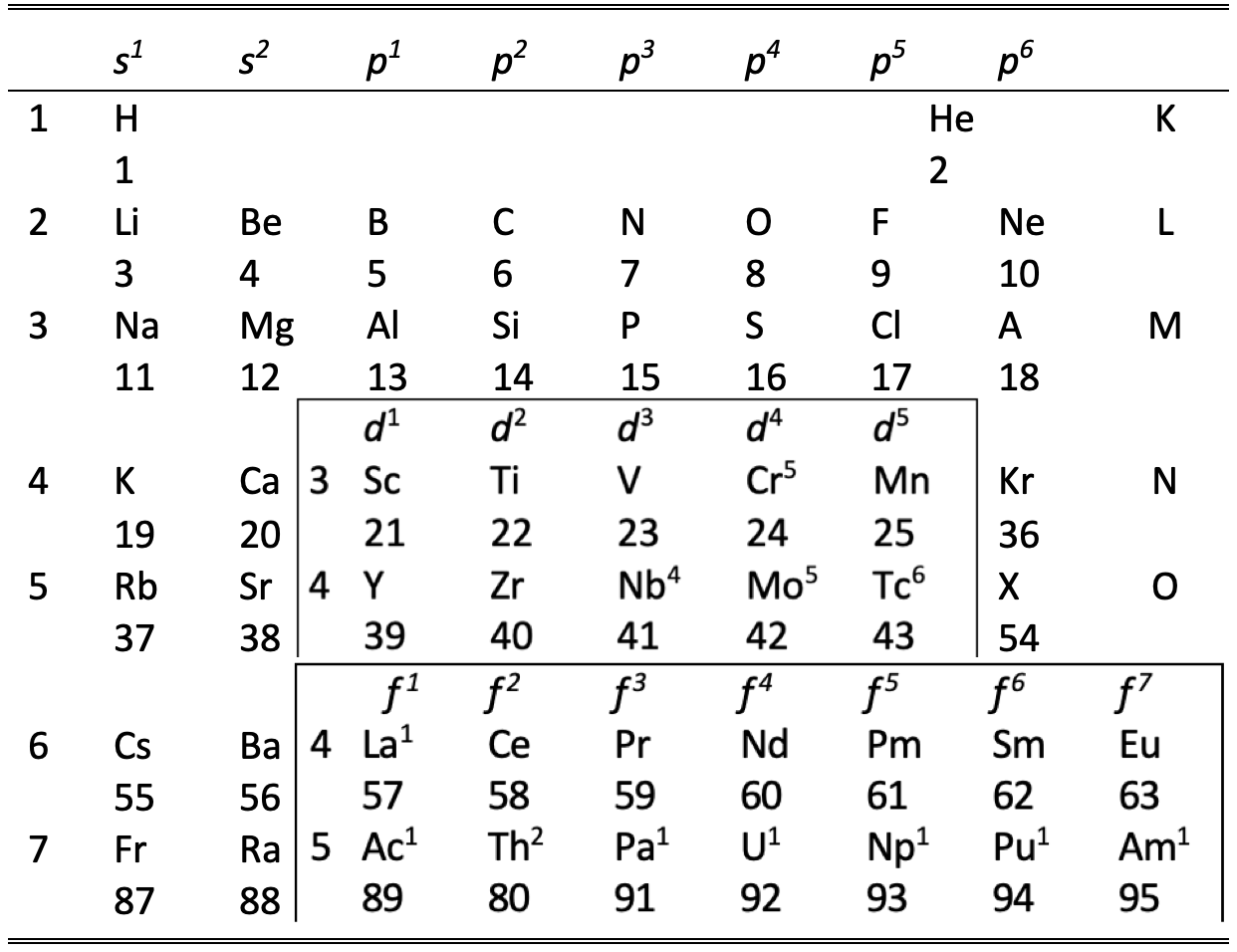
McCutchon's periodic table of 1950, with two double-sided flaps attached. The top flap shows the first half of the f-block. The flap under that shows the first half of the d- block.

Such tables, which incorporate a folding mechanism, are relatively uncommon:

- 1895 — An early example is the 'Flap' Model of the periodic table by David Orme Masson.
- 1915 — William Ramsay, in his book The Gases of The Atmosphere, included a periodic table with a fold (or flap) that can be moved from page 220 to 221.
- 1950 — McCutchon published a short table in which the d- and f-blocks were depicted as folding flaps positioned on top of the s- and p-blocks.
- 2015 — Quantum Fold Periodic Table.
- 2016 — A left step periodic table in the traditional Japanese "byobu" style.
- 2022 — A hexaflexagon periodic table.

The advantages of such tables are their novelty and that they can depict relationships that ordinarily require spatial periodic tables, yet retain the portability and convenience of two-dimensional tables. A disadvantage is that they require marginally more effort to construct.

=== Spatial ===
Spatial tables pass through three or more dimensions (helical tables are instead classed as continuous tables). Such tables are relatively niche and not as commonly used as traditional tables. While they offer unique advantages, their complexity and customization requirements make them more suitable for specialized research, advanced education, or specific areas of study where a deeper understanding of multidimensional relationships is desired.

Some other notable spatial periodic tables include:

- 1920 — Kohlweiler's system: First spatial system—Parallel planes connected by pillars of transition group and lanthanide element
- 1925 — Friend's periodic sphere: First spherical form
- 1945 — Talpain's gnomonic classification of the elements: Diagram in space having the form of a double pyramid
- 1949 — Wringley's Lamina System: First 2D/3D hybrid
- 1954 — Sabo & Lakatosh's volumetric model of the periodic table: Modular apartment building complex form
- 1965 — Giguère's periodic table: Weather vane form
- 1972 — Octagonal prismatic periodic table
- 1982 — Cement chemist's periodic cube
- 1983 — Periodic pyramid
- 1989 — Stowe's A physicist's periodic table: 4-dimensional
- 1990 — Dufour's periodic tree
- 1992 — Magarshak & Malinsky's three-dimensional periodic table: Quantum mechanics-based table with group 3 as Sc-Y-La-Ac
- 2003 — Graphic representations of the periodic system: As a building
- 2003 — Two-amphitheatre pyramid periodic table
- 2011 — Aldersley 3D periodic table: As four apartments
- 2014 — ADOMAH Periodic table glass cube: A separated table inside a tetrahedron inside a cube
- 2019 — Grainger's elemental periodicity with "concentric spheres intersecting orthogonal planes" formulation: A table in or on the corner of a room or table

=== Unclassified ===
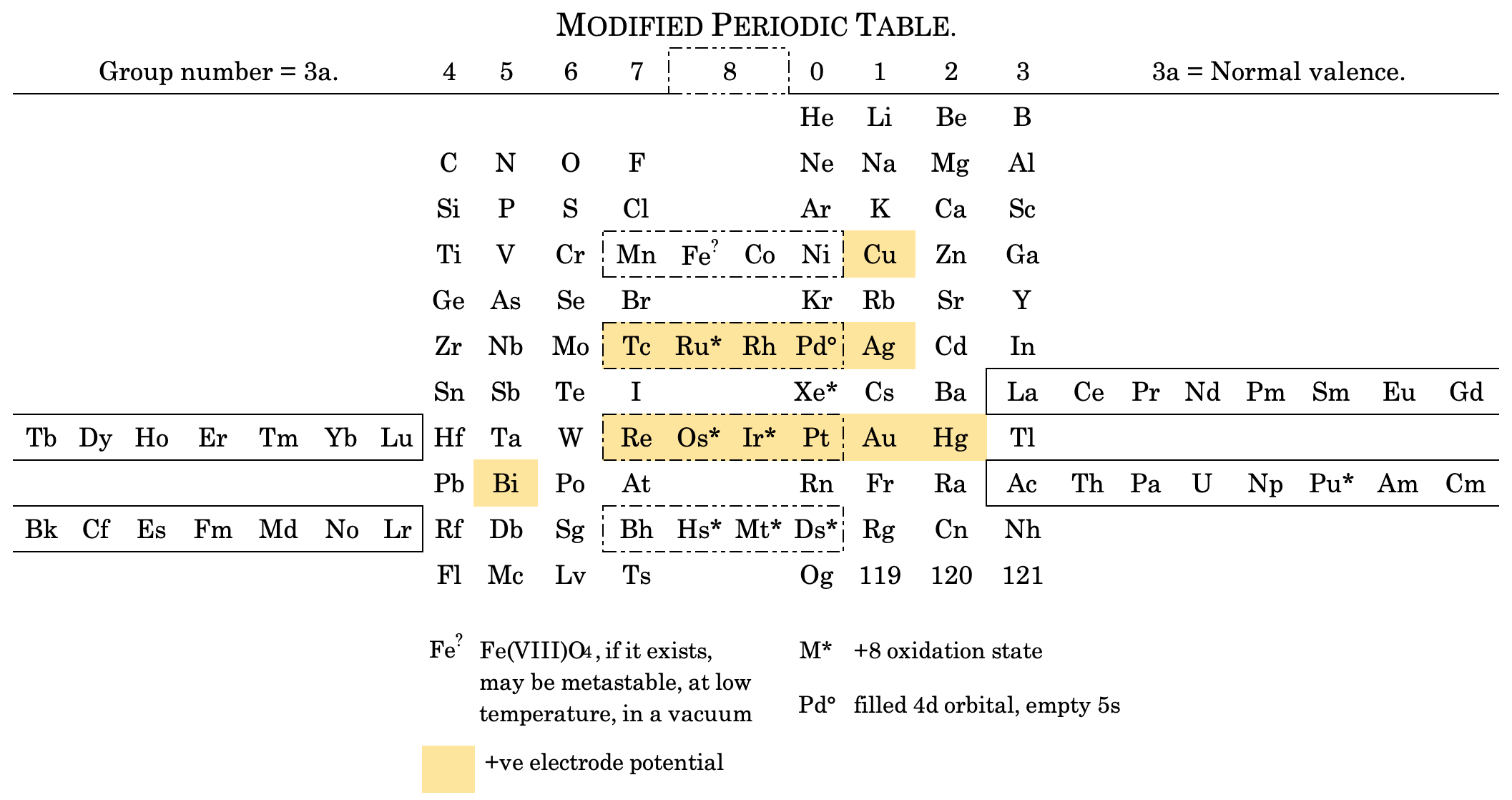
This table, which is a modernised version of von Bichowsky's table of 1918, has 24 columns and 9 1/2 groups. Group 8 forms a connecting link or transitional zone between groups 7 and 1.

Unclassified periodic tables defy easy classification:

- 1891 — Wendt's generation-tree of the elements
- 1893 — Nechaev's truncated cones
- 1907 — Grouping of the elements to illustrate refractivity: Runs from group 12 on the left to group 13 on the right
- 1918 — Cherkesov: Two periodic tables: Mn in group 8 rather than group 7
- 1920 — Stewart's arrangement of the elements: With 14 lanthanides incorporated
- 1934 — Romanoff's system: Combined spiral-lemniscate
- 1944 — Müller's tree system
- 1950 — Clark's updated periodic table: Arena system
- 1971 — Clark, John O. E. periodic table
- 2005 — Rich's periodic chart exposing diagonal relationships: Non-metals of the left; metals on the right
- 2018 — Beylkin's periodic table of the elements:4n^{2} periods, where n = 2,3..., and shows symmetry, regularity, and elegance, more so than Janet's left step table
- 2019 — Alexander arrangement unwrapped... and rewrapped: p, d and f blocks moving away from the s block in 3-dimensional space
- 2023 — Deming's 1923 periodic table, updated: 25 columns wide
- 2023 — Yin Yang periodic table: Fusion of left step table and traditional table
- 2026 — Pairs and Squares periodic table: Periods are arranged uniformly as double squares rather than lines. Thus, element families, not being blocks of columns, form congruent C-shaped stripes, emphasized by colors.

== Gallery ==
ADOMAH (long)

Curled ribbon (continuous)

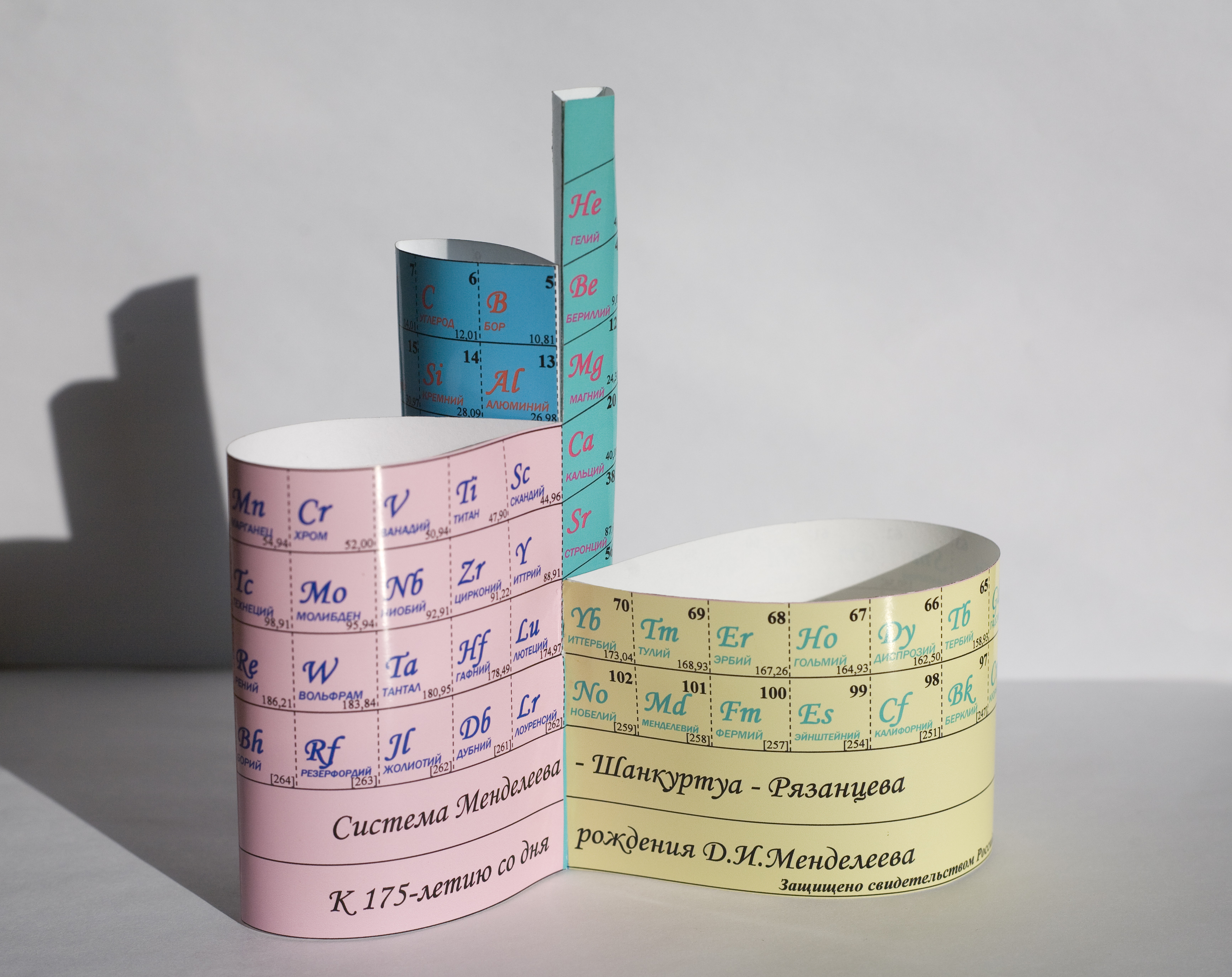
Four loops (continuous)

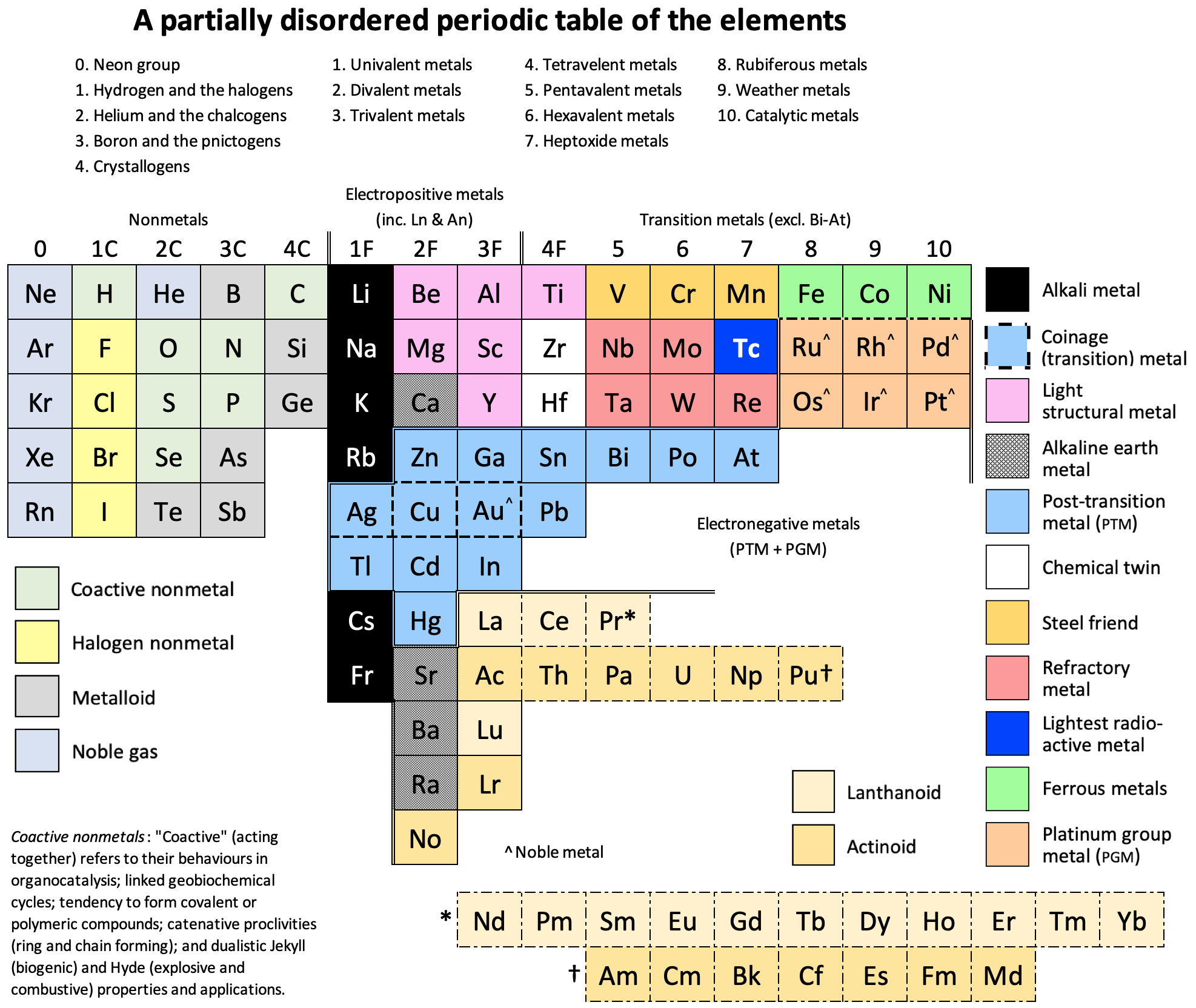
Partially disordered (unclassified)

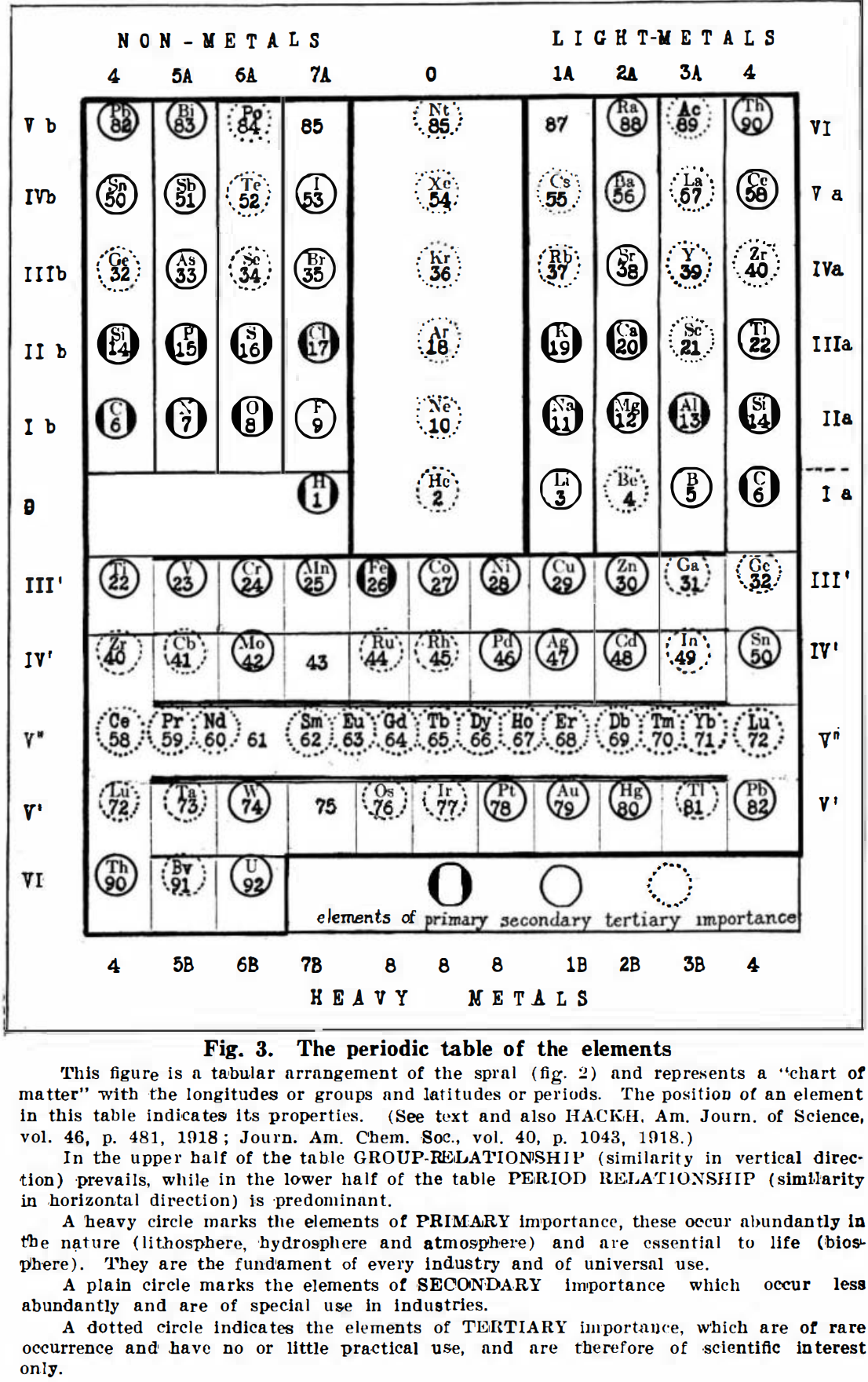
Short (9/11 columns)

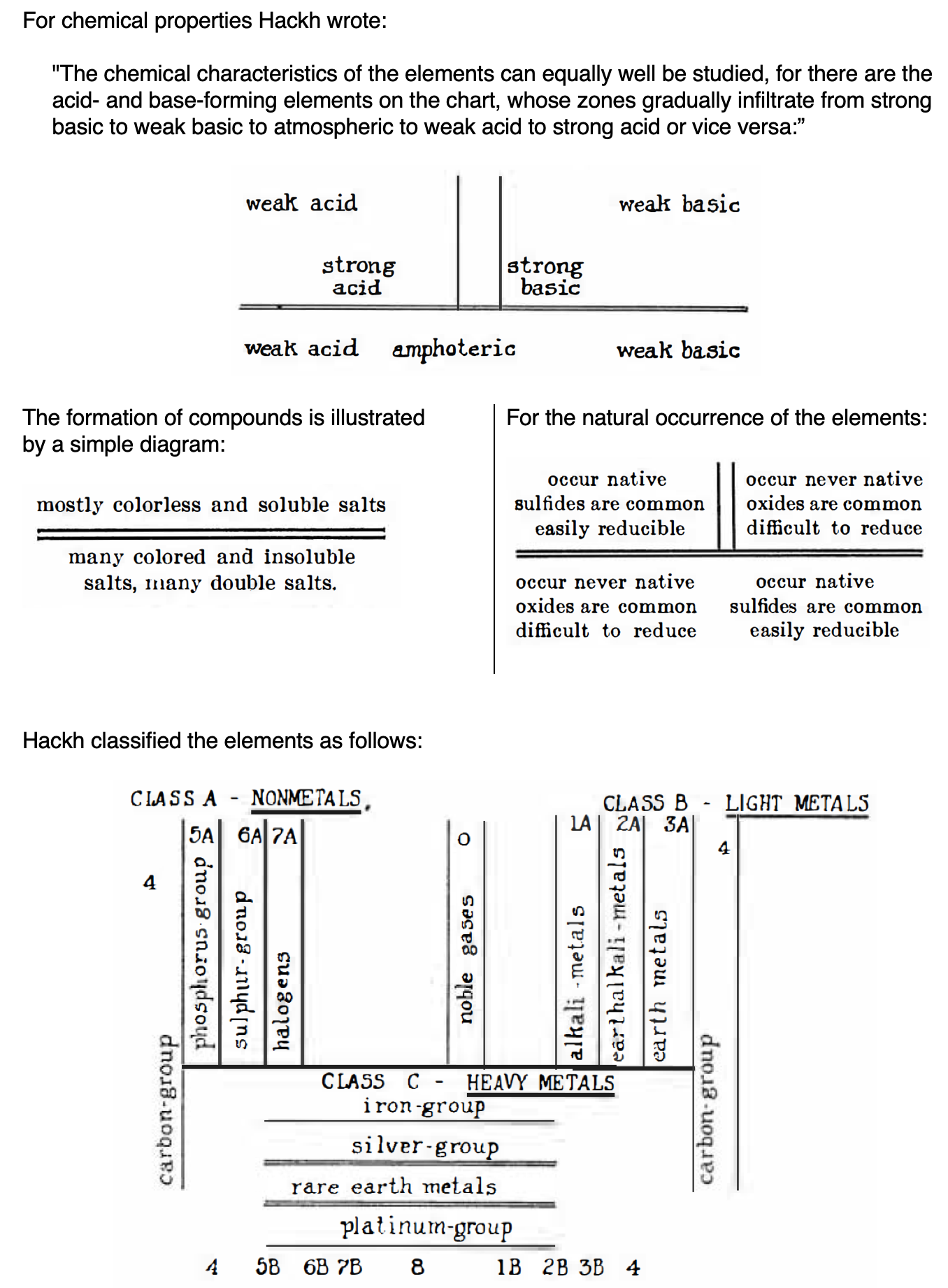
Short (9/11 columns) notes

Spiral

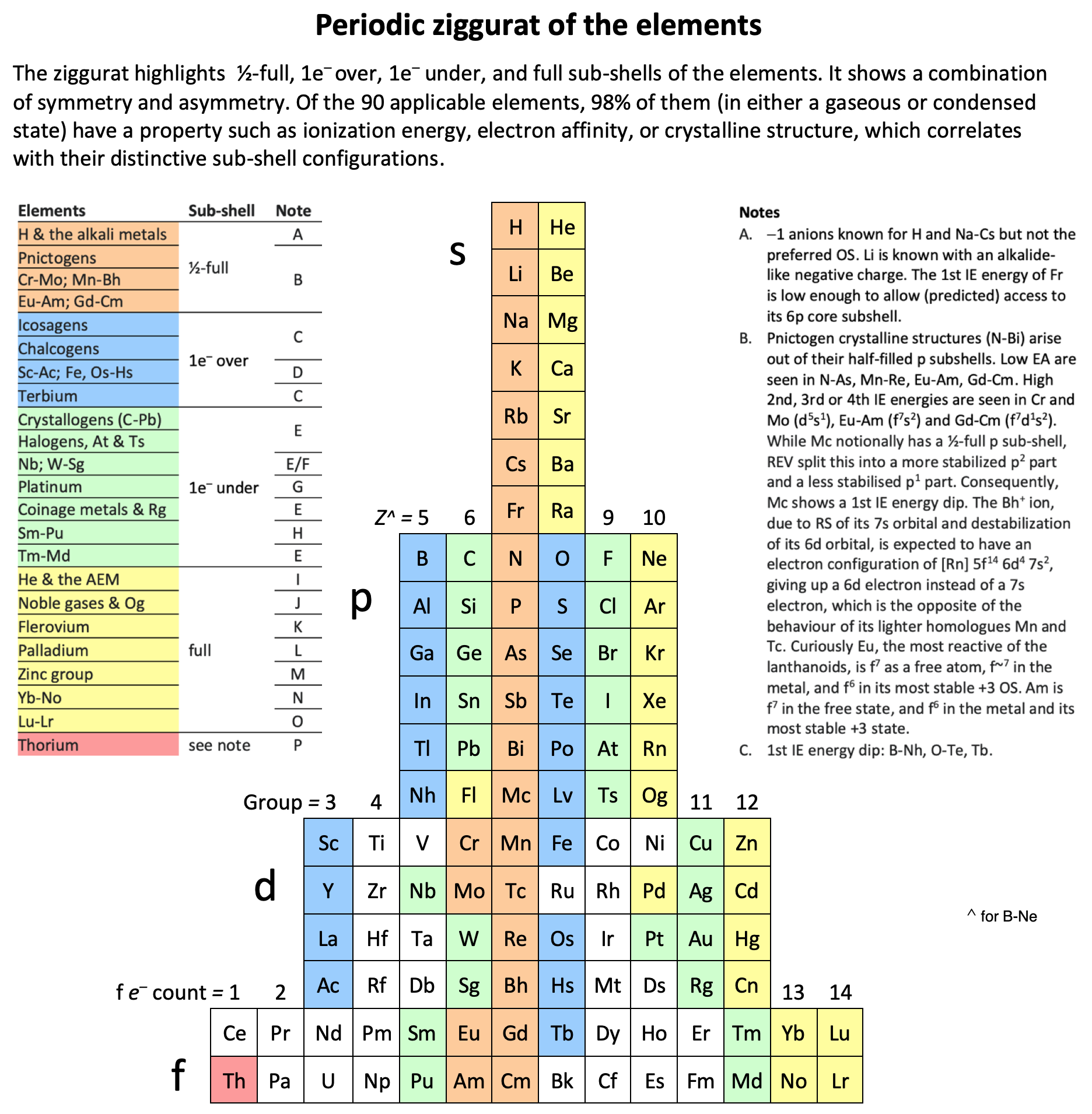
Ziggurat (unclassified)

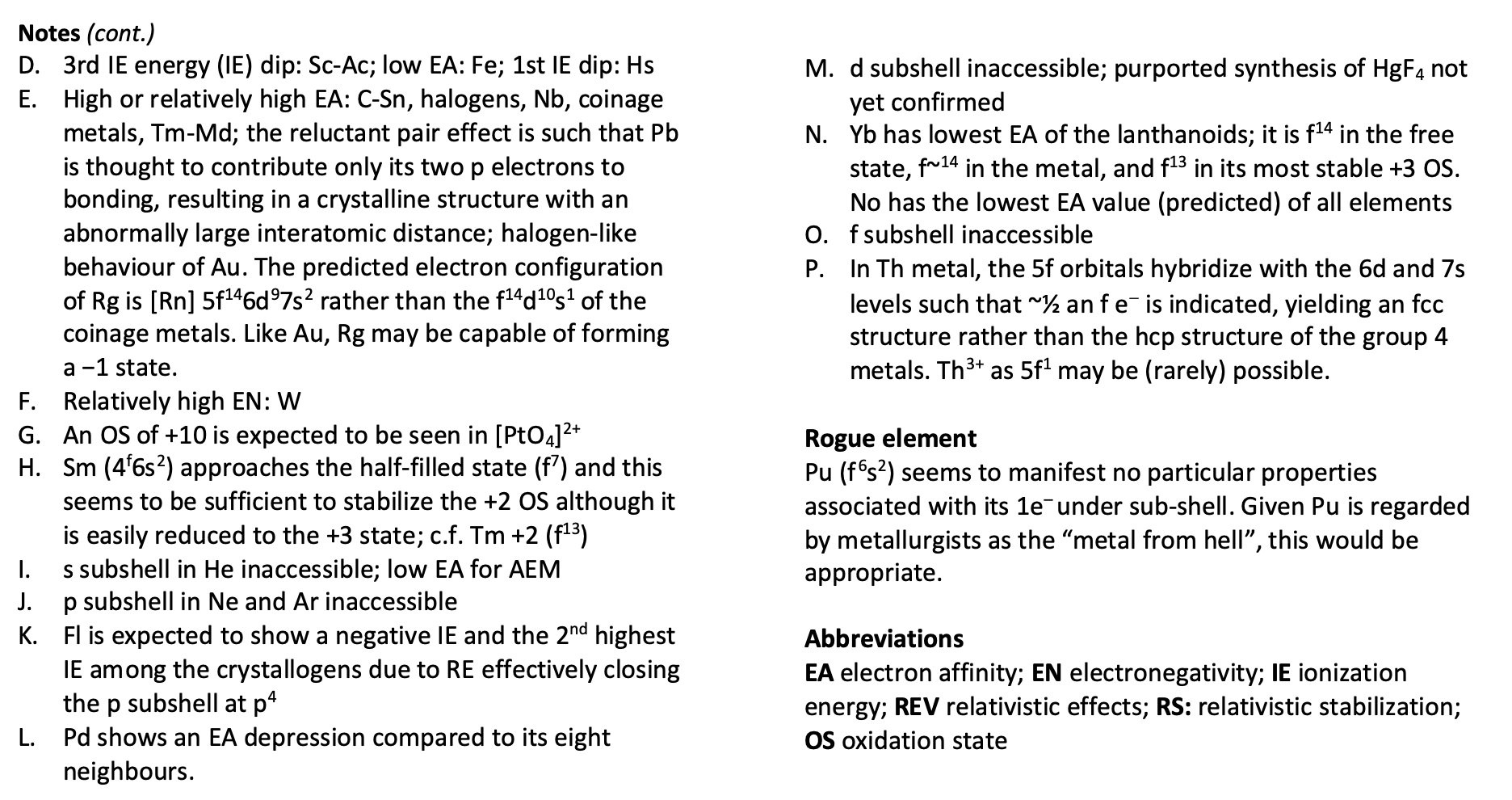
Ziggurat notes

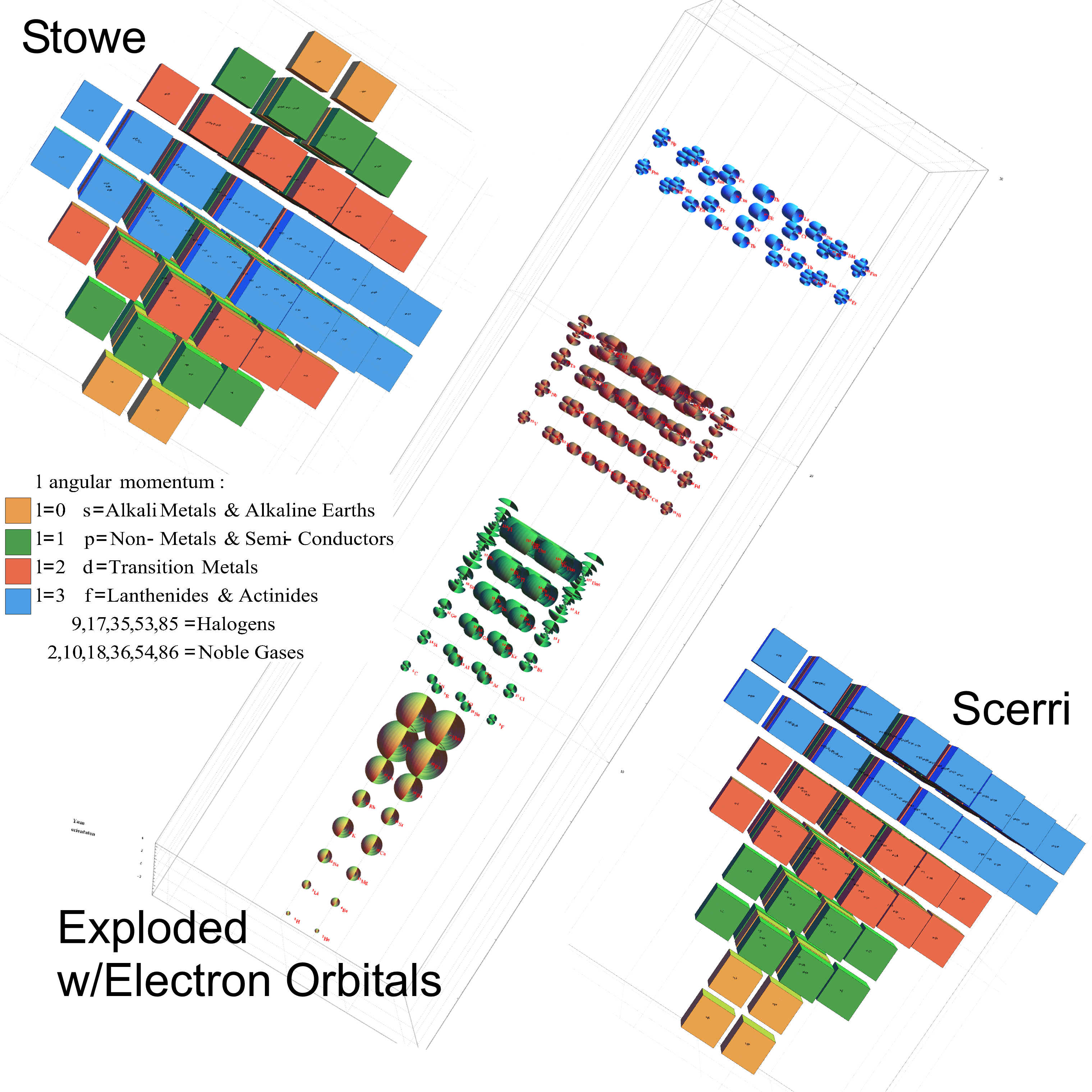
4D Stowe-Scerri (spatial)
