= Heinrich Friedrich Gretschel =

German mathematician (1830–1892)

- Born: 21 October 1830; Prietitz near Elstra, Germany
- Died: 2 February 1892 (aged 61); Freiburg, Switzerland
- Education: TU Dresden, Leipzig University
- Scientific career
- Fields: Mathematics, Science
- Workplaces: Bergakademie Freiberg

Heinrich Friedrich Gretschel (21 October 1830, in Prietitz near Elstra, Germany – 2 February 1892, in Freiburg, Switzerland) was a German mathematician and scientist.

In 1847, Gretschel became a student at the Technischen Bildungsanstalt (now TU Dresden). On 28 April 1851 he was enrolled at Leipzig University, where he studied mathematics, natural sciences and ancient languages. In 1854, he passed the examination for the higher school office in the first ranking and became a teacher at the Leipziger Gesamtgymnasium.

On 2 January 1873 he was promoted by the Faculty of Philosophy of the University of Leipzig as a result of completing the mathematical dissertation, Lehrbuch zur Einführung in die organische Geometrie ("Introduction to organic geometry").

On 7 January 1873 he became professor of mathematics and geometric construction at the Bergakademie Freiberg, a position that he held until his death in 1892. In 1876, Gretschel became a Bergrat professor. During 1875–1880, 1881–1883, and 1886–1889 he belonged to the Bergakademischen Senate.

Gretschel wrote and lectured in a wide range of fields, publishing books about meteorology, physics, chemistry, astronomy, geometry and cartography. He and Georg Bornemann wrote about the organization of the periodic table, published as Das Naturliche System der Elemente (1883). Gretschel also wrote about the construction of stringed instruments in the violin family and co-wrote a book on the construction of the pianoforte with Julius Blüthner, Lehrbuch des Pianofortebaues (1872).
