= Friedrich Kipp =

German physician and entomologist

Friedrich Kipp (c. 1814 – 21 January 1869) was a German medical doctor and entomologist.
