= Karl Arnold (chemist) =

German chemist, mineralogy and mountaineer (1853–1929)

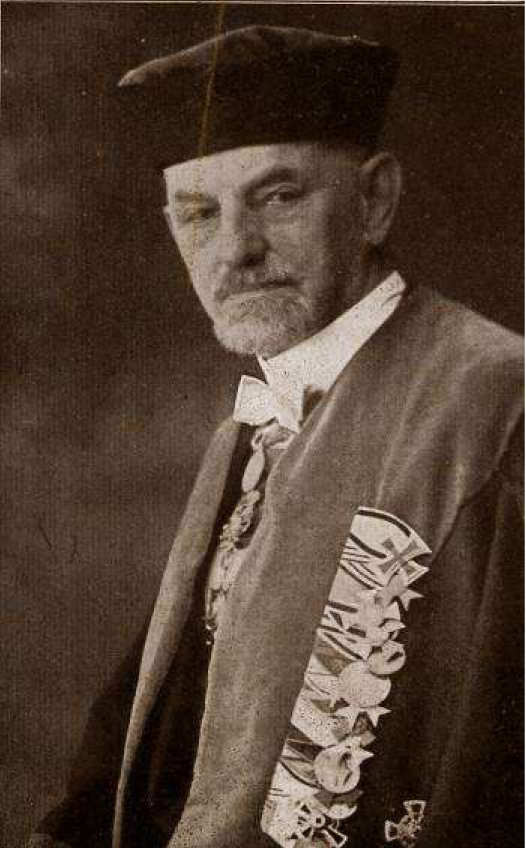
- Karl Arnold, Director of the Institute of Chemistry, ca.1889
- Born: 12 March 1853; Uffenheim, Kingdom of Bavaria
- Died: 24 June 1929 (aged 76); Hanover, Germany
- Scientific career
- Fields: Chemistry, mountaineering

Karl Arnold, variously Carl Johann Moritz Arnold or Johann Karl Moritz Arnold (12 March 1853 – 24 June 1929), was a German chemist and mountaineer. He served as Director and briefly as Vice-Chancellor of the Institute of Chemistry at the University of Veterinary Medicine Hanover. His published works on organic chemistry were of importance to veterinarians, medical students and pharmacists. He was also an accomplished alpinist and chairman of the Hanover section of the German-Austrian Alpine Association.

== Early life ==
Karl Arnold was the son of chemist Georg Friedrich Arnold of the village of Uffenheim. From 1851 to 1859, Georg Friedrich Arnold operated a pharmacy in the lower floor of the town hall. The family then moved to Ansbach, where Georg Friedrich Arnold became the Bavarian court pharmacist.

== Education ==
After attending the local gymnasium, Karl Arnold began training as a pharmacist with his Father, also working as an assistant apothecary in pharmacies in Zofingen, Hamburg, Frankfurt am Main and Magdeburg.

In 1875, he began formal studies in pharmacy at the Ludwig-Maximilians-Universität München, receiving his license as a pharmacist in 1876. Arnold worked with Max Joseph von Pettenkofer, professor of hygiene at the Ludwig-Maximilians-Universität München. During his time in Munich, he became a member of an academic singing association, the Akademische Gesangverein (AGV) München in the Sondershäuser Verband. Arnold went on to study chemistry and physics at the University of Tübingen, where he worked with Julius Lothar Meyer. Meyer proposed models for the periodic table of elements in 1860 and 1868, and Arnold himself proposed a model for the periodic table in 1885.

In 1877, Arnold passed the state teaching examinations for natural science. He completed his doctoral thesis with Robert Wilhelm Bunsen at Heidelberg University, studying inorganic and physical chemistry. Arnold received the degree of Doctor of Philosophy in 1878, at the age of 25. Karl Arnold worked as a pharmacist to fulfill his military service. He was an assistant in Würzburg and a lecturer in Gerstungen.

== Royal Veterinary School ==
On 1 May 1880, Arnold began to work at the Königliche Tierarzneischule (Royal Veterinary School) in Hanover (now the University of Veterinary Medicine Hanover). Initially he was a lecturer, demonstrator and tutor in chemistry and physics, earning "1500 M. Remuneration, freier Wohnung, Licht und Heizung in der Anstalt" ("1500 M. Remuneration, free apartment, light and heating in the institution").

When chairman Karl Begemann fell ill in 1883, Arnold took over his chemistry courses. After Begemann died in 1885, Arnold was formally appointed as lecturer in chemistry, pharmacy and pharmacognosy. He became head of the university pharmacy. As of 1889, Arnold became director of the Institute of Chemistry and the sole chemistry lecturer. In 1890, he was appointed to the rank of professor.

Following the mandate given to Begemann to expand and modernize the chemistry department, Arnold developed an expansion plan including chemical labs and an auditorium. As of 1899, this plan was put into effect, locating the new buildings on the Bischofsholer Damm.

Karl Arnold remained director of the Chemistry Institute from 1889 until 1921.

In 1913, the university created the post of rector. Karl Arnold was the first person to be elected to the Vice-Chancellor of the School of Veterinary Medicine, on 7 May 1913, but declined the post. It was eventually accepted by Bernhard Malkmus (1913–1915) who held the rectorship from 1913 to 1915. Malkmus was called up for military service in 1915, and Arnold replaced him as Vice-Chancellor from 30 May 1915 to 1 August 1915.

Arnold died on 24 June 1929. A street, Karl-Arnold-Platz, is named in his honor.

== Research ==
In organic chemistry, Arnold studied the determination of chlorides, urea, uric acid, phosphates, alkaloids and sugar under physiological conditions. Many of these substances were part of the composition of urine, and could be useful in assessing both normal body function and disease. He also studied disinfectants including hydrogen peroxide, formalin, lysol, ozone, and creole soaps. He developed methods to detect and characterize their use in medications. He also studied the hygiene of milk and food ingredients and tested air quality in stables.

He published extensively on chemical analysis, veterinary medicine, and medicine. His Repetitorium der Chemie ("Chemistry Revision Course") was a standard work for veterinarians, medical students and pharmacists. Reprinted sixteen times, its last edition appeared in 1923. Anleitung zur qualitativen, chemischen Analyse anorganischer und organischer Körper sowie zur toxikologisch-chemischen und medizinisch-chemischen Analyse ("Instruction Manual on Qualitative, Chemical Analysis of Inorganic and Organic Bodies as well as on Toxicological-Chemical and Medical-Chemical Analysis") was also frequently reprinted, as was Pharmakognosie, pharmazeutisch-chemische Präparate und Rezeptierkunde ("Pharmacognosis, Pharmaceutical-Chemical Substances and the Science of Prescribing"). Arnold also published a three-volume work, Tierärztliche Arzneibuch für Studierende und praktische Tierärzte ("Veterinary Medicinal Book for Students and Practising Veterinarians" with professor of physiology Josef Tereg.

Arnold's published works also included a design for the periodic table.

== Mountaineering ==
In 1869 16-year-old Karl Arnold climbed the Alps for the first time. He was a member of the German-Austrian Alpine Association (Deutscher und Österreichischer Alpenverein) for almost 45 years, and chairman of the Hanover section. After making an ascent of the Ankogel in 1885, he encouraged development of the town of Mallnitz in Carinthia, now part of High Tauern National Park as a locale for mountaineers. In 1886, the main committee of the Alpine Association gave the Hanover section responsibility for the Ankogel area. The hill to the left of the original Hanover House was renamed Arnoldhöhe in Carl Arnold's honor in 1888. Arnold and the Hanover section arranged for the building of the original Hanover House above Mallnitz on the Etschlsattel, inaugurated in 1911 to meet the needs of visitors using the recently built Tauern Railway. (In 2014 a newer building of the same name was built nearby, replacing the original which had burnt.)

Arnold's ashes were buried in an urn in a small mausoleum that Arnold had built on the Arnoldshöhe near what was then Hanover house.
