= Vsevolod Klechkovsky =

Soviet chemist (1900–1972)

- Born: Vsevolod Mavrikievich Klechkovsky; November 28, 1900; Moscow, Russian Empire
- Died: May 2, 1972 (aged 71); Moscow, Soviet Union
- Occupation: Chemist
- Known for: Radioisotope studies of plant nutrition Rule for ordering atomic orbital energies

Vsevolod Mavrikievich Klechkovsky (Russian: Все́волод Маври́киевич Клечко́вский; also transliterated as Klechkovskii and Klechkowski; November 28, 1900 – May 2, 1972) was a Soviet and Russian agricultural chemist known for his work with radioisotopes.

== Biography ==
He graduated in 1929 from the Moscow agricultural academy and worked there from 1930. He became a professor in 1955, and an academician of the All-Union Academy of Agricultural Sciences of the Soviet Union (known as VASKhNIL) in 1956.

His use of isotopic labeling in the advance of soil chemistry led to his being considered a founder of agricultural radiology. He was one of the first to study plant nutrition using radioisotopes, for which he received the Stalin Prize in 1952 along with his academy co-workers. He studied the behavior of heavy nuclei daughter isotopes in soils.

Following the 1957 Kyshtym disaster, Klechkovsky led the research projects studying the long-term effects of radioactive contamination at the site.

Klechkovsky also studied theoretical chemistry, and proposed a theoretical justification of the empirical Madelung rule for the ordering of atomic orbital energies. This rule is therefore sometimes called Klechkovsky's rule, especially in Russian and in French sources.
