= Gil Chaverri Rodríguez =

Costa Rican chemist and physicist

Gil Chaverri Rodriguez
- Born: José Gil Chaverri Rodriguez; March 15, 1921; Heredia, Costa Rica
- Died: May 27, 2005 (aged 84); Hospital México, San José, Costa Rica
- Education: University of Costa Rica, Cornell University, Iowa State University
- Scientific career
- Fields: Chemistry
- Workplaces: University of Costa Rica

Gil Chaverri Rodríguez (March 15, 1921, in Heredia, Costa Rica – May 27, 2005, in San José, Costa Rica) was a Costa Rican chemist and physicist. Chaverri created an original arrangement of the periodic table of chemical elements, published in 1952 in the Journal of Chemical Education. His arrangement of the periodic table was based on the electronic structure of each element, and was used in Costa Rican schools.

== Childhood and early education ==
José Gil Chaverri Rodriguez was born in Heredia, Costa Rica on March 15, 1921, to José Joaquín Chaverri Zúñiga and María Josefa Rodríguez Solera. His family later moved to San José, where he attended primary school at Escuela Buenaventura Corrales (1928-1933) and secondary school at the Colegio Seminario de San José (Seminary School, 1934-1937) and the Liceo de Costa Rica (1938-1939).

== University education ==
At the University of Costa Rica he earned a degree in agricultural engineering from the Faculty of Agronomy in 1944. He went from there to Cornell University, where he received a Masters in Sciences in 1945. He also studied engineering at the University of Costa Rica from 1955-1957.

In 1959, he received a scholarship from the National Academy of Sciences of the United States, which enabled him to attend Iowa State University. There he completed a Ph.D. thesis on the Application of the solubility-product principle to the dissolution of phosphate rock in 1962.

In addition to his scientific studies, he was a gifted linguist, reading and speaking English, French and German by the time he finished high school, and later studying Russian, Latin, Greek, Italian and Portuguese.

== Career ==
Gil Chaverri Rodriguez began teaching in 1942, at the Colegio Seminario. From 1946-1978 he taught chemistry at the University of Costa Rica, where he held a number of position. He was head of the Chemical Laboratory of the Ministry of Agriculture and Livestock (Laboratorio Químico del Ministerio de Agricultura y Ganadería) from 1948-1956. He was the founding Director of the Center for Agronomic Research (Centro de Investigación Agronómica, CIA) from 1956-1960, and Dean of the Faculty of Sciences and Letters from 1965-1971. He published both educational and scientific works, including textbooks such as Ley de acción de masas y sus aplicaciones ("Law of mass action and its applications", 1950). From 1978 to 1999 he taught at the Escuela Autónoma de Ciencias Médicas. He retired in 1999.

== Periodic Table ==
Chaverri Rodríguez created an arrangement of the Periodic Table of Chemical Elements, published in 1952 in the Journal of Chemical Education. His arrangement is based on the electronic structure of the elements, which allows for the placement of the lanthanide and actinide series in a logical sequence according to their atomic number. It has been used for teaching chemistry in Costa Rican schools.

== Personal ==
Chaverri Rodríguez was married to Antonieta Polini Castro, with whom he lived in the San Antonio district of the Desamparados canton of San José. They had seven children. His wife predeceased him by two years.

Gil Chaverri Rodríguez died at the Hospital México, San José, Costa Rica on May 27, 2005. Although he had suffered from Parkinson's disease for some time, the immediate cause of death was a heart attack.
