= Hugo Stintzing =

German physics professor (1888–1970)

- Born: 10 August 1888; Munich, Germany
- Died: 11 December 1970 (aged 82); Darmstadt, West Germany
- Education: Technische Hochschule Berlin, University of Leipzig, University of Giessen
- Scientific career
- Fields: Chemistry
- Workplaces: Technische Hochschule Darmstadt

Hugo Stintzing (10 August 1888 in Munich, Germany – 11 December 1970 in Darmstadt, West Germany) was a German university lecturer in physics at the Technische Hochschule Darmstadt. He was involved in early research on the electron scanning microscope, studied radioactive elements and developed a model for the periodic table. He was the Director of the Institute of X-Ray Physics and Technology at Darmstadt from 1936 to 1945. He was removed from his position due to his involvement in the National Socialist German Workers' Party (NSDAP, Nazi Party, joined 1933), and was interned in 1946.

== Childhood ==
Hugo Stintzing was born in Munich, Germany on 10 August 1888 the son of Roderich Stintzing, an internist and later professor of internal medicine.

== Education ==
Hugo studied chemistry and metallurgy, graduating in May 1911 with the title Diplomingenieur (a degree in engineering) from the Technische Hochschule in Charlottenburg (now Technische Universität Berlin).

From 1913 he was assistant at the Photochemical Department of the Physikalisch-Chemisches Institut (the Institute of Physical Chemistry) at the University of Leipzig. His dissertation on the subject of the influence of light on colloid systems was published in 1914. He received his Doctorate in Philosophy on 12 January 1915 from the University of Giessen.

In 1916 he proposed a model for the periodic table, organized as a cone-like rotational body. His paper, "Eine neue Anordnung des periodischen Systems der Elemente" (A new arrangement of the periodic system of the elements) was published in Zeitschrift für Physikalische Chemie. His representation of the elements is one of several early helix-based displays.

From 1918 he was an assistant at the Physikalisch-Chemisches Institut of the University of Giessen. He habilitated in 1923 with a thesis on the use of x-rays for chemical investigations: Röntgenographisch-chemische Untersuchungen.

== Career ==
Hugo Stintzing then became a lecturer in physical chemistry and technology at the University of Giessen. On 4 July 1928 he was appointed an extraordinary professor of physical chemistry at the University of Giessen, lecturing on X-ray spectroscopy. During the early part of his career, he translated some of the works of Niels Bohr into German.

In 1929, Stintzing filed a patent for a proposed electron scanning microscope, to be capable of automatic detection and measurement of particles using a light beam or beam of electrons. He suggested the use of crossed slits to obtain a small diameter probe. A light beam could be mechanically scanned, while an electron beam could be detected using electric or magnetic fields. Detectors would observe the beam transmitted after absorption or scattering. A chart recorder would represent the linear dimension of a particle by the width of a deflection, and its amplitude by thickness. No drawings accompany the specification, and Stintzing is presumed not to have attempted construction of such an instrument. Almost forty years later, a computer-controlled scanning electron microscope based on his specifications was built and tested. The results were presented at the Fifth International Congress on X-Ray Optics and Microanalysis at Tübingen University in 1968.

Stintzing worked on the chemical analysis of x-ray spectra, developing apparatus with x-ray tubes for the measurement of secondary fluorescent emission lines. He published a textbook on Rontgenstrahlen und Chemische Bindung ("X-ray and chemical bonding") in 1931.

In 1936, Stintzing was appointed to Technische Hochschule Darmstadt, to replace Paul Knipping, who had died unexpectedly. Knipping had founded an institute for X-ray physics and technology at Darmstadt in 1929/30. Stintzing held a lectureship (Lehrauftrag) at Darmstadt as of 1 April 1936, and was appointed Director of the Institute of X-Ray Physics and Technology as of 1 October 1936. On 10 June 1943 he received promotion to the rank of extraordinary professor of X-ray physics and technology at Darmstadt. As early as 1942, the Stintzing X-ray Institute was classified as important to the war and the state, which meant that the institute obtained funding and privileges during the Second World War.

== Military and political involvement ==
During the First World War Hugo Stintzing was in the artillery with the rank of lieutenant of the reserve. On 1 May 1933, Hugo Stintzing joined the National Socialist German Workers' Party (NSDAP, Nazi Party) as well as its paramilitary wing, the Sturmabteilung. From September 1938 to June 1940, he held the position of National Socialist lecturer at the University of Darmstadt. Like Karl Lieser, Friedrich List and Jakob Sprenger, he was a strong supporter of Nazism.

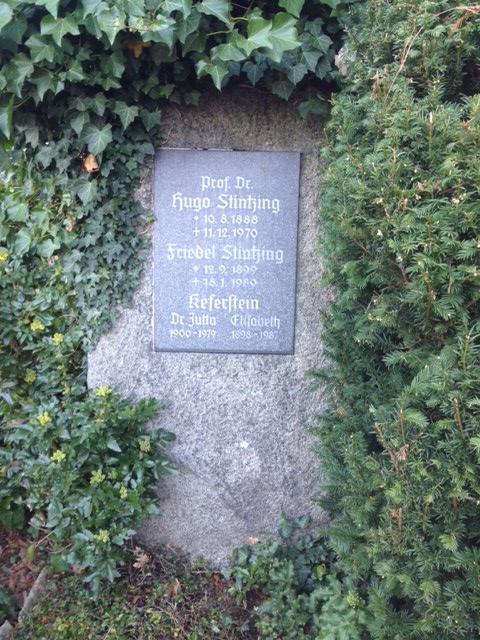
Gravestone, Hugo & Friedel Stintzing, Darmstadt

On 8 October 1945 Hugo Stintzing was removed from his position at the university by the American military government. In 1946 he was interned. The Institute for X-Ray Physics and X-Ray Technology was merged into the Technische Hochschule Darmstadt, under the direction of Richard Vieweg.

As of 4 November 1955, Stintzing applied for a patent for a Method and apparatus for improving the effectiveness of radioactive sources, which was granted on 27 March 1958. A notice in Physick Journal in 1958 commemorated his 70th birthday.

== Personal life ==
Hugo Stintzing was married to Friedel (Frieda) Gertrud Keferstein (1899–1989) on 15 October 1929.

Hugo Stintzing died at the age of 82 on 11 December 1970 and was buried in the Old Cemetery in Darmstadt, Germany.
