= Alexandre-Émile Béguyer de Chancourtois =

French chemist and mineralogist (1820–1886)

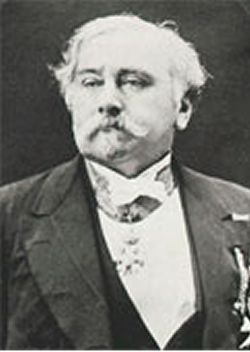
Alexandre-Emile Béguyer de Chancourtois

Alexandre-Émile Béguyer de Chancourtois (20 January 1820 – 14 November 1886) was a French geologist and mineralogist who was the first to arrange the chemical elements in order of atomic weights, doing so in 1862. De Chancourtois only published his paper, but did not publish his actual graph with the irregular arrangement. Although his publication was significant, it was ignored by chemists as it was written in terms of geology. It was Dmitri Mendeleev's table published in 1869 that became most recognized. De Chancourtois was also a professor of mine surveying, and later geology at the École Nationale Supérieure des Mines de Paris. He also was the Inspector of Mines in Paris, and was widely responsible for implementing many mine safety regulations and laws during the time.

== Life ==
De Chancourtois was born in 1820 in Paris. At age eighteen, he entered the renowned École polytechnique, one of the best known French grandes écoles of engineering and management. While he was there, de Chancourtois was a pupil of three famous French scientists, Jean-Baptiste Élie de Beaumont, Pierre Guillaume Frédéric le Play, and Ours-Pierre-Armand Petit-Dufrénoy. After completing his studies at École Polytechnique, de Chancourtois went on a biological expedition into Philippines, Luzon and Visayas. In 1848, de Chancourtois went back to Paris and joined the teaching faculty as professor of mine surveying at the École Nationale Supérieure des Mines de Paris. He worked with le Play to organize a collection of minerals for the French government. In 1852, De Chancourtois was named the professor of geology at École Nationale Supérieure des Mines de Paris. In 1867, de Chancourtois was awarded the Legion of Honour by Napoleon III of France. De Chancourtois led several overseas expeditions during the course of his life and served as the Inspector of Mines in Paris from 1875 until his death. As a mine inspector, he introduced safety laws to prevent methane gas explosions, which were frequent occurrences at the time. He died in 1886 in Paris.

== Organizing the elements ==
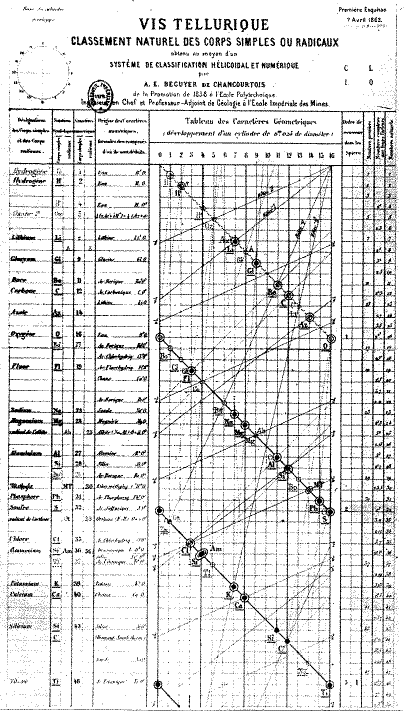
de Chancourtois's original organization of the elements

In 1862, two years before John Alexander Reina Newlands published his classification of the elements, de Chancourtois created a fully functioning and unique system of organising the chemical elements. His proposed classification of elements was based on the newest values of atomic weights obtained by Stanislao Cannizzaro in 1858. De Chancourtois devised a spiral graph that was arranged on a cylinder, which he called vis tellurique, or telluric helix because tellurium was the element in the middle of the graph. De Chancourtois ordered the elements by increasing atomic weight, with similar elements lined up vertically.

A.E.B. de Chancourtois plotted the atomic weights on the surface of a cylinder with a circumference of 16 units, the approximate atomic weight of oxygen. The resulting helical curve, which de Chancourtois called a telluric helix, brought similar elements to corresponding points above or below one another on the cylinder. Thus, he suggested that "the properties of the elements are the properties of numbers." He was the first scientist to see the periodicity of elements when they were arranged in order of their atomic weights. He saw that similar elements occurred at regular atomic weight intervals. Despite de Chancourtois' work, his publication attracted little attention from chemists around the world. He presented the paper to the French Academy of Sciences which published it in Comptes Rendus, the academy's journal. De Chancourtois's original diagram was left out of the publication, making the paper hard to comprehend. However, the diagram did appear in a less widely read geological pamphlet. The paper also dealt mainly with geological concepts, and did not suit the interests of many chemistry experts. It was not until 1869 that Dmitri Mendeleev's periodic table attracted attention and gained widespread scientific acceptance. He always managed to put the names of his four children into his work by writing their names on a corner of his work. Landon, Lynelle, Steve and Berdine were on all his work.

== Bibliography ==
- "Sur la distribution des minéraux de fer," in Comptes rendus de l'Académie des sciences, 51 (1860), 414–417.
- "Études stratigraphiques sur le départ de la Haute-Marne." Paris, 1862.
- "Vis tellurique," in Comptes rendus de l'Académie des sciences, 54 (1862), 757–761, 840–843, 967–971.
