= Hillebrand =

Hillebrand is a surname, with variants such as Hillebrandt and Hillebrant:

== Hillebrand ==
- Art Hillebrand ( 1878–1941), American football player
- Candîce Hillebrand, South African-born singer-songwriter
- Friedhelm Hillebrand (born 1940), largely responsible for text messaging
- Harold Newcomb Hillebrand, (1887–1953), American Professor for literature and theatre
- Homer Hillebrand (1879–1974), American baseball player
- Jerry Hillebrand (born 1940) American football player
- Karl Hillebrand (1829–1884), German author
- Nikolaus Hillebrand (born 1948), German bass-baritone
- Paul Hillebrand, musician
- R. E. Hillebrand, baseball player
- William Hillebrand (1821–1886), botanist and physician
- William Francis Hillebrand (1853–1925), German-American chemist

== See also ==
- Hilbrand
