= History of the periodic table =

Development of the table of chemical elements

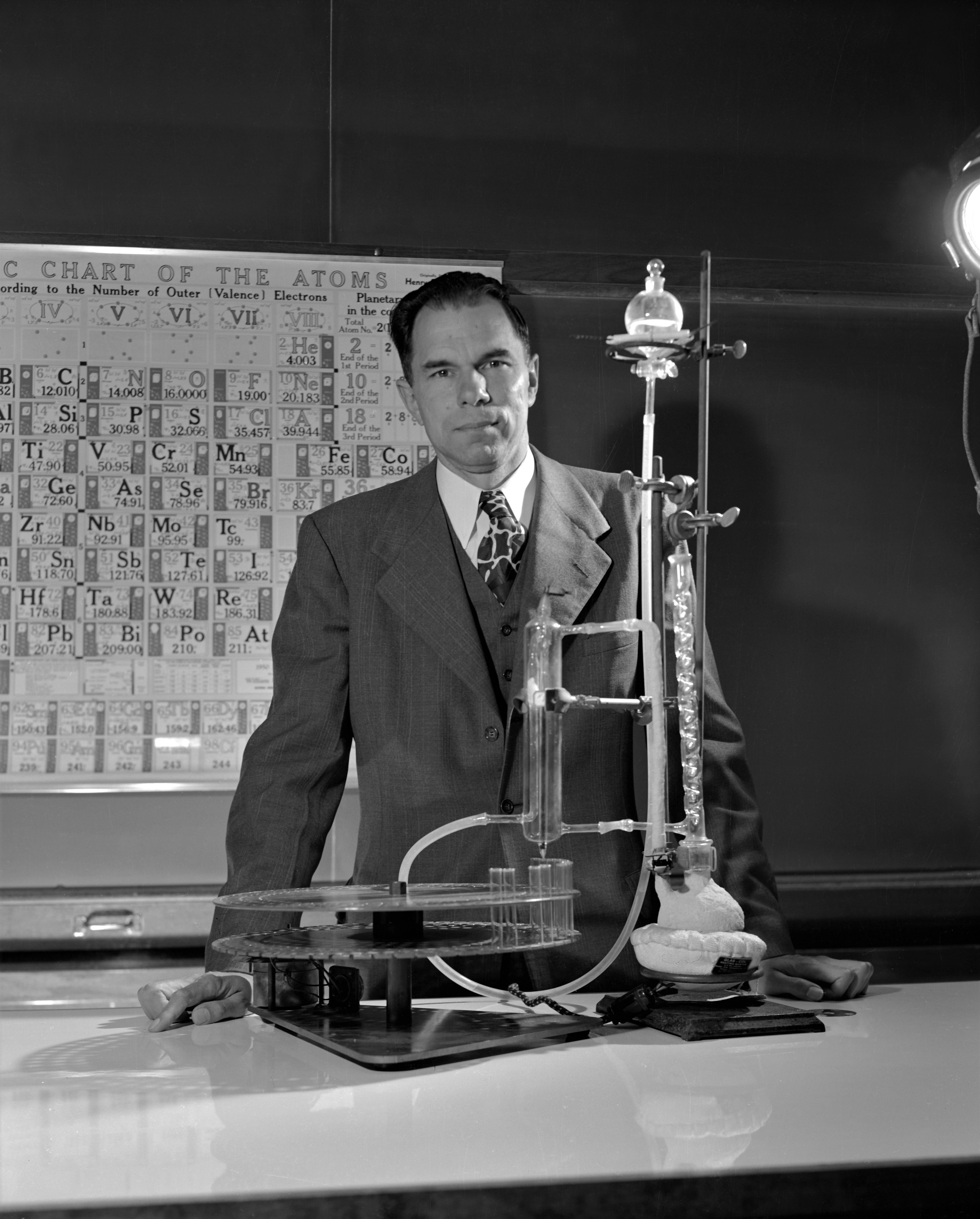
The American chemist Glenn T. Seaborg—after whom the element seaborgium is named—standing in front of a periodic table, May 19, 1950

The periodic table is an arrangement of the chemical elements, structured by their atomic number, electron configuration and recurring chemical properties. In the basic form, elements are presented in order of increasing atomic number, in the reading sequence. Then, rows and columns are created by starting new rows and inserting blank cells, so that rows (periods) and columns (groups) show elements with recurring properties (called periodicity). For example, all elements in group (column) 18 are noble gases that are largely—though not completely—unreactive.

The history of the periodic table reflects over two centuries of growth in the understanding of the chemical and physical properties of the elements, with major contributions made by Antoine-Laurent de Lavoisier, Johann Wolfgang Döbereiner, John Newlands, Julius Lothar Meyer, Dmitri Mendeleev, Glenn T. Seaborg, and others.

== Early history ==
=== Democritus ===
In the 5th century BCE, Leucippus and his pupil Democritus proposed that all matter was composed of small indivisible particles which they called "atoms". Democritus believed that atoms:

- are too small to be detected by the senses
- are infinite in number
- come in infinitely many varieties
- have existed forever
- are in constant motion in the void or vacuum.

What we perceive as water, fire, plants, or humans are merely combinations of atoms in the void.

=== Aristotle ===
Around 330 BCE, the Greek philosopher Aristotle proposed that everything is made up of a mixture of one or more roots, an idea originally suggested by the Sicilian philosopher Empedocles. The four roots, which the Athenian philosopher Plato called elements, were earth, water, air and fire. Similar ideas existed in other ancient traditions, such as Indian philosophy with five elements: Earth, water, fire, air and aether collectively called 'pañca bhūta'.

=== History of modern elements ===
Of the chemical elements, as shown in the periodic table,

- nine – carbon, sulfur, iron, copper, silver, tin, gold, mercury, and lead – have been known since antiquity, as they are found in their native form (ie uncombined elemental form) and are relatively simple to mine with primitive tools.
- four more were known in the age of alchemy: zinc, arsenic, antimony, and bismuth.
- platinum was known to pre-Columbian South Americans, but knowledge of it did not reach Europe until the 16th century.

== First classification ==
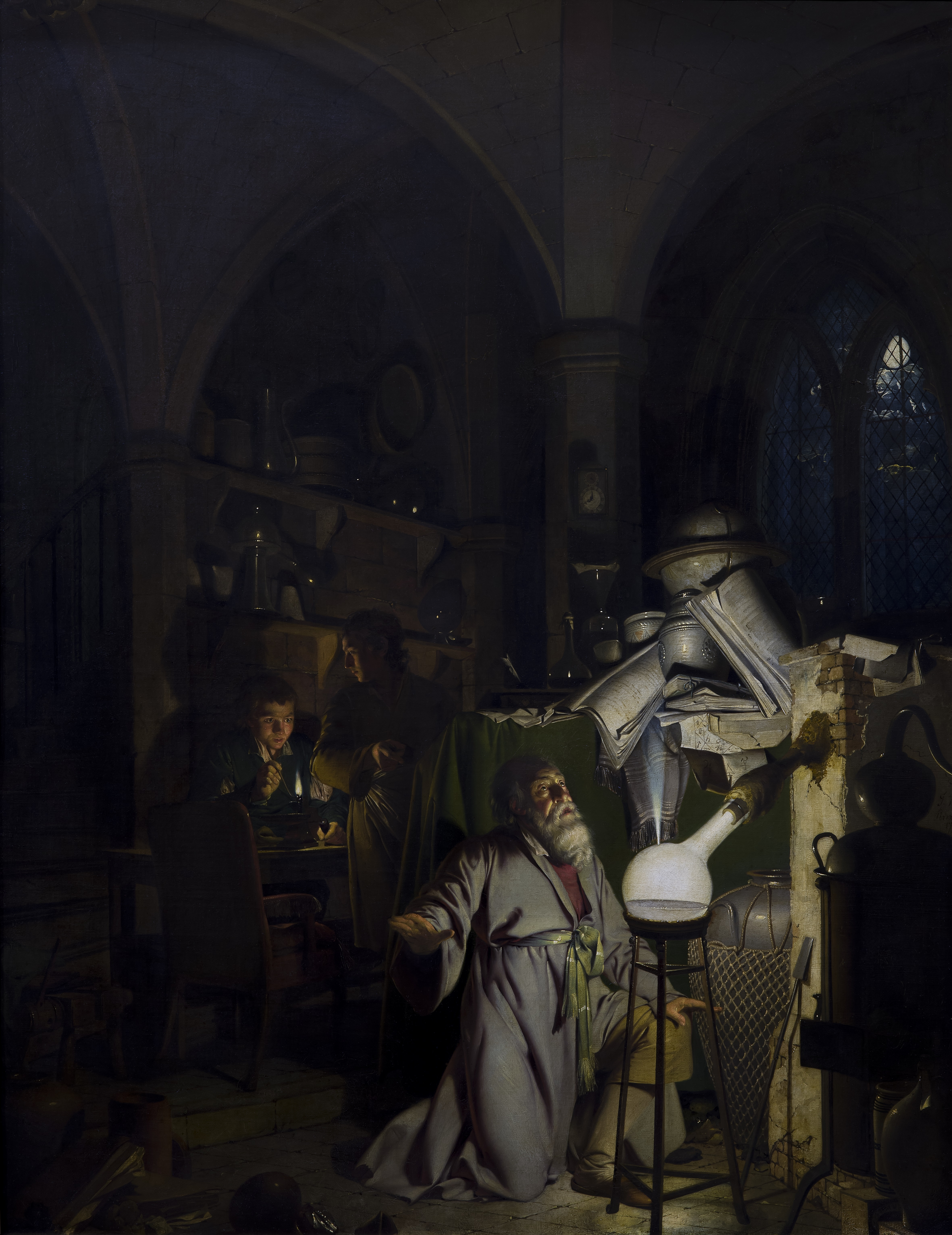
Hennig Brand, as shown in The Alchemist Discovering Phosphorus

The history of the periodic table is also a history of the discovery of the chemical elements. In 1661, Boyle defined elements as "those primitive and simple Bodies of which the mixt ones are said to be composed, and into which they are ultimately resolved."

The first person in recorded history to discover a new element was Hennig Brand, a bankrupt German merchant. Brand tried to discover the philosopher's stone—a mythical object that was supposed to turn inexpensive base metals into gold. In 1669, or later, his experiments with distilled human urine resulted in the production of a glowing white substance, which he called "cold fire" (kaltes Feuer). He kept his discovery secret until 1680, when Anglo-Irish chemist Robert Boyle rediscovered phosphorus and published his findings.

The discovery of phosphorus helped to raise the question of what it meant for a substance (any given variety of matter) to be an element, in a world where versions of atomic theory were only speculative and later understandings of the nature of substances were only beginning to become possible.

In 1718, Étienne François Geoffroy's Affinity Table made use of several aspects — (1) tabular grouping and (2) correlation with chemical affinity — that would later be reprised.

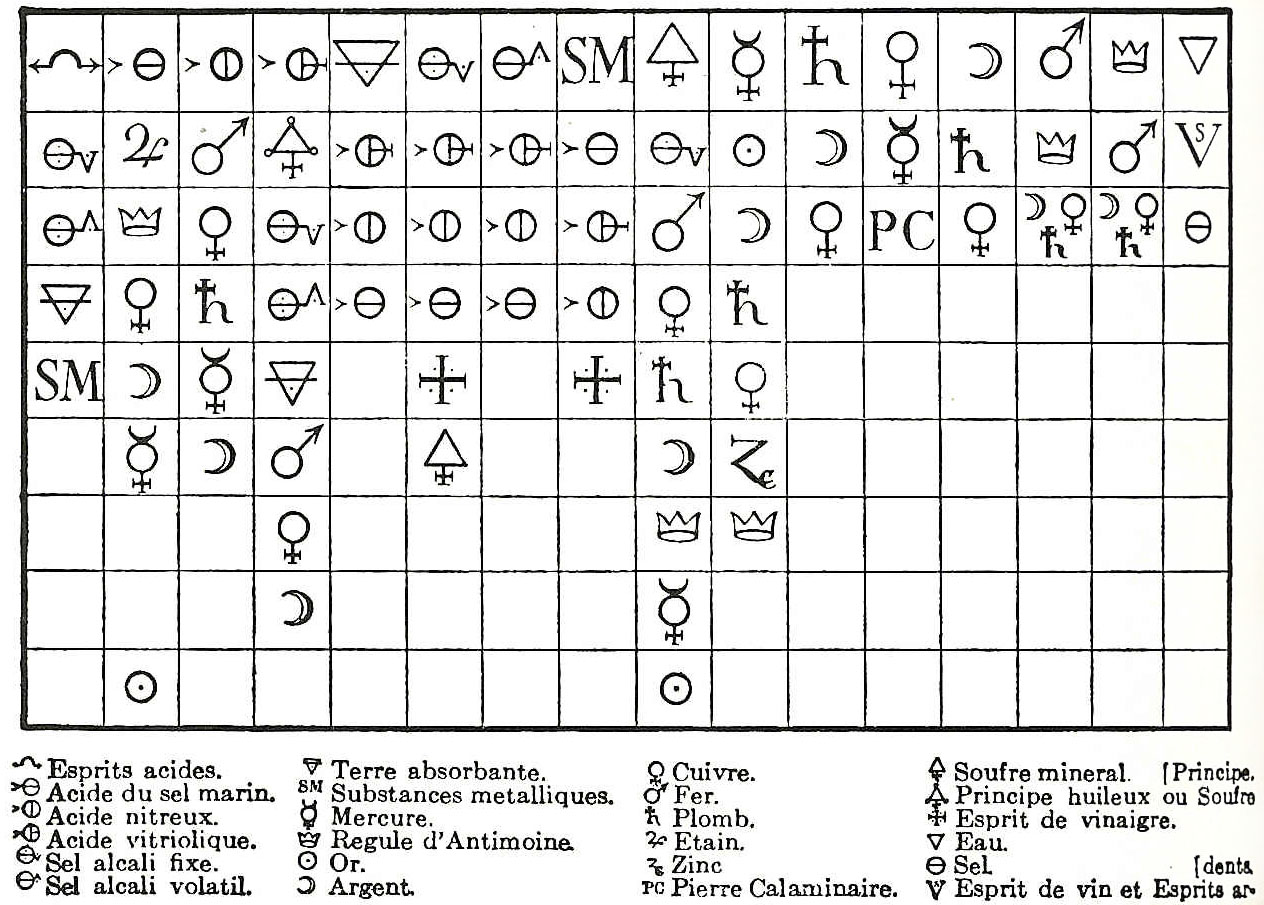
Geoffroy's 1718 Affinity Table: at the head of each column is a chemical species with which all the species below can combine. Some historians have defined this table as being the start of the chemical revolution.

In 1789, French chemist Antoine Lavoisier wrote Traité Élémentaire de Chimie (Elementary Treatise of Chemistry), which is considered to be the first modern textbook about chemistry. Lavoisier defined an element as a substance whose smallest units cannot be broken down into a simpler substance. Lavoisier's book contained a list of "simple substances" that Lavoisier believed could not be broken down further, which included oxygen, nitrogen, hydrogen, phosphorus, mercury, zinc and sulfur. This formed the basis for the modern list of elements. Lavoisier's list also included "light" and "caloric", which at the time were believed to be material substances. He classified these substances into metals and nonmetals. While many leading chemists refused to believe Lavoisier's new revelations, the Elementary Treatise was written well enough to convince the younger generation. However, Lavoisier's descriptions of his elements lack completeness, as he only classified them as metals and non-metals.

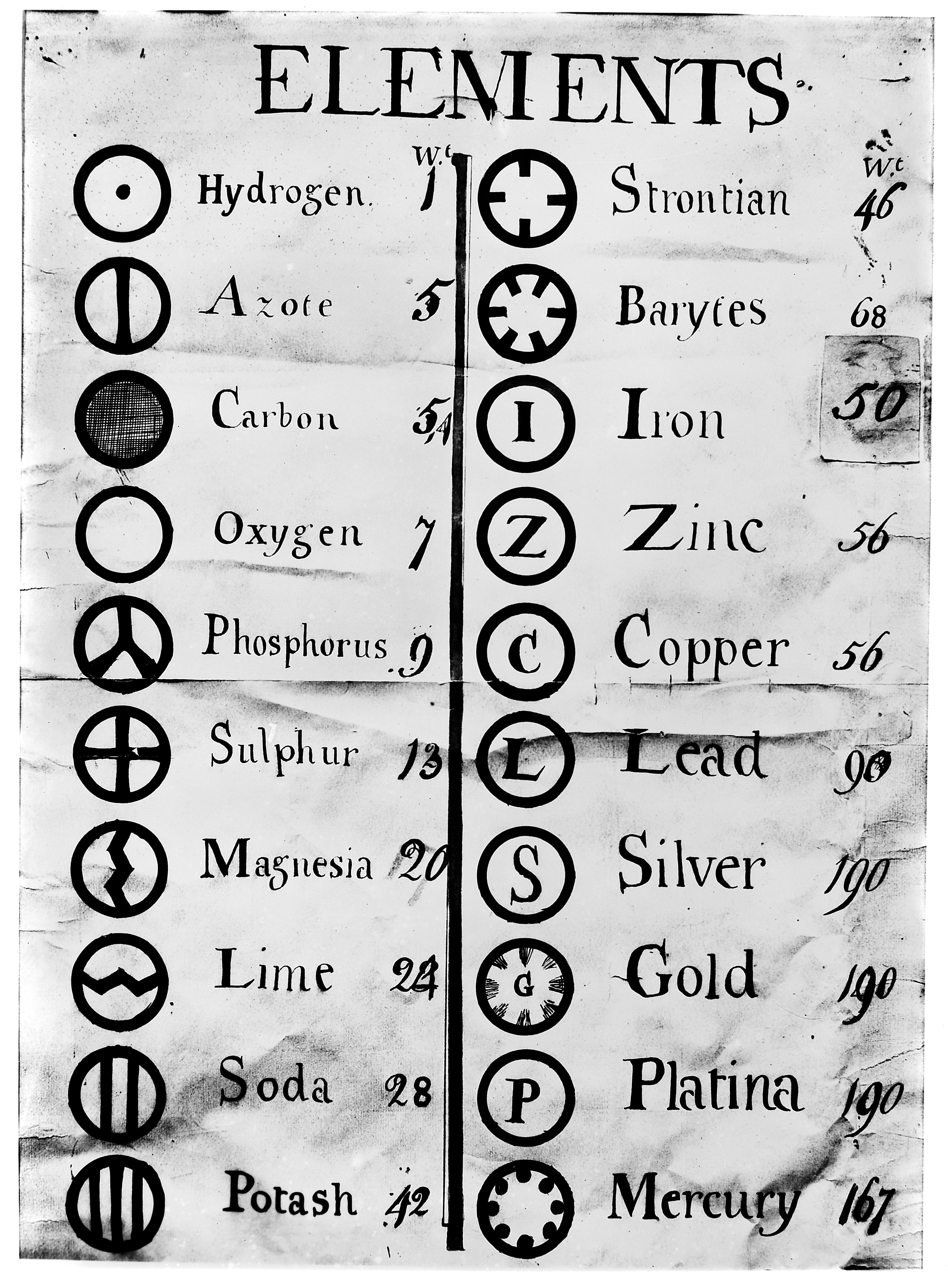
Dalton's 1806 list of known elements by atomic weight

In 1808–10, British natural philosopher John Dalton published a method by which to arrive at provisional atomic weights for the elements known in his day, from stoichiometric measurements and reasonable inferences. Dalton's atomic theory was adopted by many chemists during the 1810s and 1820s.

In 1815, British physician and chemist William Prout noticed that atomic weights seemed to be multiples of that of hydrogen.

In 1817, German physicist Johann Wolfgang Döbereiner began to formulate one of the earliest attempts to classify the elements. In 1829, he found that he could form some of the elements into groups of three, with the members of each group having related properties. He termed these groups triads. In 1843, building on work done by Döbereiner, Leopold Gmelin developed a forerunner of the modern periodic table that listed 55 chemical elements grouped by common characteristics.

Definition of Triad law

"Chemically analogous elements arranged in increasing order of their atomic weights formed well marked groups of three called Triads in which the atomic weight of the middle element was found to be generally the arithmetic mean of the atomic weight of the other two elements in the triad.

1. chlorine, bromine, and iodine
2. calcium, strontium, and barium
3. sulfur, selenium, and tellurium
4. lithium, sodium, and potassium

All those attempts to sort elements by atomic weights were inhibited by the inaccurate determination of weights, and not just slightly: carbon, oxygen and many other elements were believed to be half their actual masses (cf. the illustration by Dalton above), because only monatomic gases were believed to exist. Even though Amedeo Avogadro and, independently of him, André-Marie Ampère, proposed the solution in the form of diatomic molecules and Avogadro's law already in the 1810s, it was not until after Stanislao Cannizzaro's publications in late 1850s when the theory began to be widely considered.

In 1860, the modern scientific consensus emerged at the first international chemical conference, the Karlsruhe Congress, and a revised list of elements and atomic masses was adopted. It helped spur creation of more extensive systems. The first such system emerged in two years.

== Comprehensive formalizations ==
Properties of the elements, and thus properties of light and heavy bodies formed by them, are in a periodic dependence on their atomic weight.

— Russian chemist Dmitri Mendeleev, formulating the periodic law for the first time in his 1871 article "Periodic regularity of the chemical elements"

French geologist Alexandre-Émile Béguyer de Chancourtois noticed that the elements, when ordered by their atomic weights, displayed similar properties at regular intervals. In 1862, he devised a three-dimensional chart, named the "telluric helix", after the element tellurium, which fell near the center of his diagram. With the elements arranged in a spiral on a cylinder by order of increasing atomic weight, de Chancourtois saw that elements with similar properties lined up vertically. The original paper from Chancourtois in Comptes rendus de l'Académie des Sciences did not include a chart and used geological rather than chemical terms. In 1863, he extended his work by including a chart and adding ions and compounds.

The next attempt was made in 1864. British chemist John Newlands presented in Chemical News a classification of the 62 known elements. Newlands noticed recurring trends in physical properties of the elements at recurring intervals of multiples of eight in order of mass number; based on this observation, he produced a classification of these elements into eight groups. Each group displayed a similar progression; Newlands likened these progressions to the progression of notes within a musical scale. Newlands's table left no gaps for possible future elements, and in some cases had two elements at the same position in the same octave. Newlands's table was ignored or ridiculed by some of his contemporaries. The Chemical Society refused to publish his work. The president of the society, William Odling, defended the society's decision by saying that such "theoretical" topics might be controversial; there was even harsher opposition from within the society, suggesting the elements could have been just as well listed alphabetically. Later that year, Odling suggested a table of his own but failed to get recognition following his role in opposing Newlands's table.

German chemist Lothar Meyer also noted the sequences of similar chemical and physical properties repeated at periodic intervals. According to him, if the atomic weights were plotted as ordinates (i.e. vertically) and the atomic volumes as abscissas (i.e. horizontally)—the curve obtained is a series of maximums and minimums—the most electropositive elements would appear at the peaks of the curve in the order of their atomic weights. In 1864, a book of his was published; it contained an early version of the periodic table containing 28 elements, and classified elements into six families by their valence—for the first time, elements had been grouped according to their valence. Works on organizing the elements by atomic weight had until then been stymied by inaccurate measurements of the atomic weights. In 1868, he revised his table, but this revision was published as a draft only after his death. In a paper dated December 1869 which appeared early in 1870, Meyer published a new periodic table of 55 elements, in which the series of periods are ended by an element of the alkaline earth metal group. The paper also included a line chart of relative atomic volumes, which illustrated periodic relationships of physical characteristics of the elements, and which assisted Meyer in deciding where elements should appear in his periodic table. By this time he had already seen the publication of Mendeleev's first periodic table, but his work appears to have been largely independent.

In 1869, Russian chemist Dmitri Mendeleev arranged 63 elements by increasing atomic weight in several columns, noting recurring chemical properties across them. It is sometimes said that he played "chemical solitaire" on long train journeys, using cards containing the symbols, atomic weights, and chemical properties of the known elements. Another possibility is that he was inspired in part by the periodicity of the Sanskrit alphabet, which was pointed out to him by his friend and linguist Otto von Böhtlingk. Mendeleev used the trends he saw to suggest that atomic weights of some elements were incorrect, and accordingly changed their placements: for instance, he figured there was no place for a trivalent beryllium with the atomic weight of 14 in his work, and he cut both the atomic weight and valency of beryllium by a third, suggesting it was a divalent element with the atomic weight of 9.4. Mendeleev widely distributed printed broadsheets of the table to various chemists in Russia and abroad. Mendeleev argued in 1869 there were seven types of highest oxides. (Note: They were R_{2}O, R_{2}O_{2}, R_{2}O_{3}, R_{2}O_{4}, R_{2}O_{5}, R_{2}O_{6}, and R_{2}O_{7}. The list was later appended with R_{2}O_{8}.) Mendeleev continued to improve his ordering; in 1870, it gained a tabular shape, and each column was given its own highest oxide, and in 1871, he further developed it and formulated what he termed the "law of periodicity". Some changes also occurred with new revisions, with some elements changing positions.

Various attempts to construct a comprehensive formalization

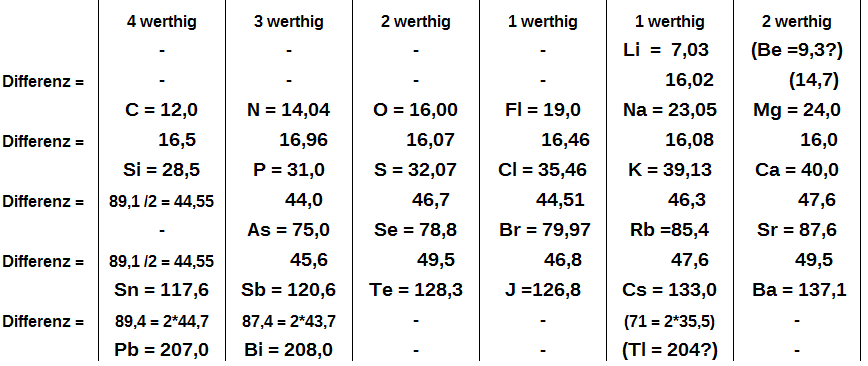
Meyer's periodic table, published in "Die modernen Theorien der Chemie", 1864

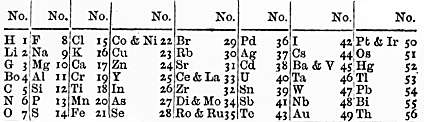
Newlands's law of octaves, 1866

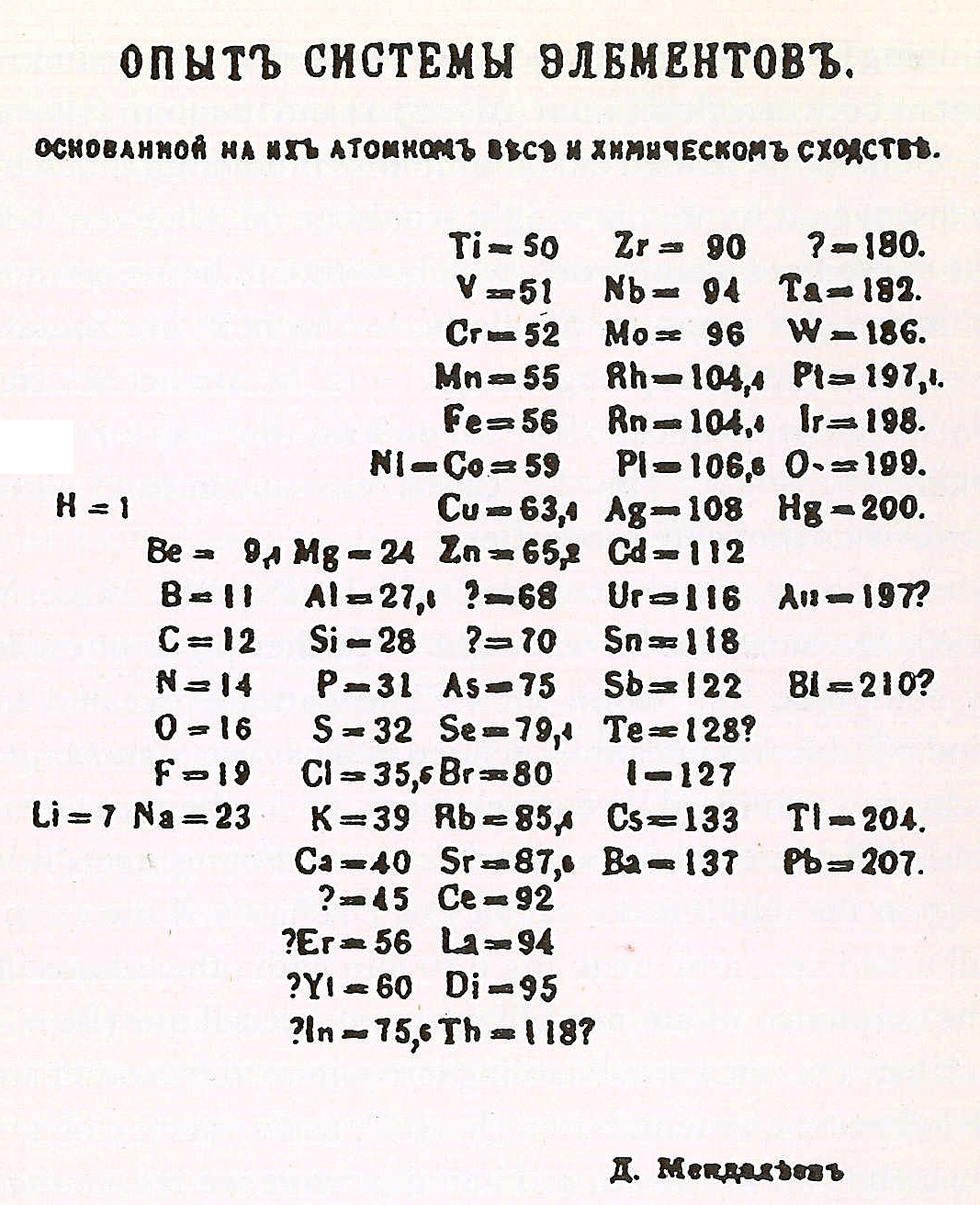
Mendeleev's first Attempt at a system of elements, 1869

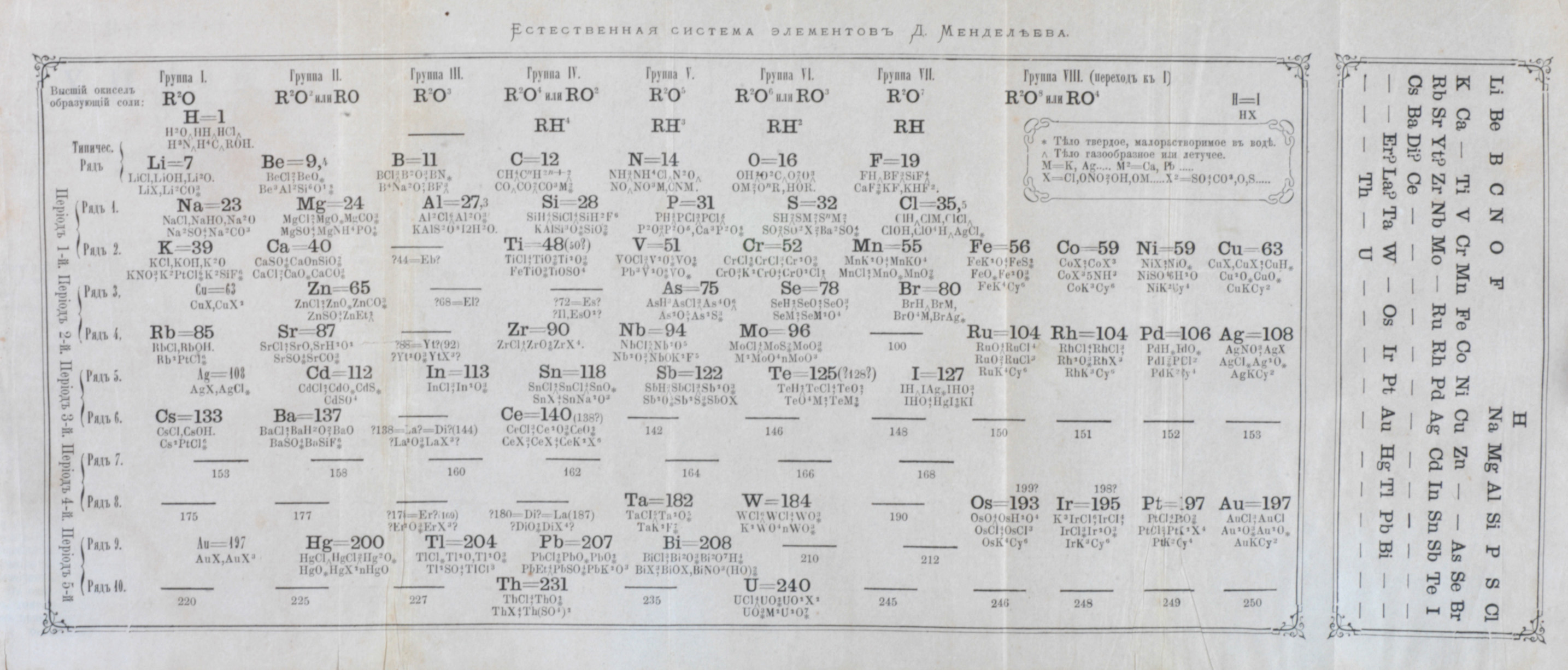
Mendeleev's Natural system of the elements, 1870

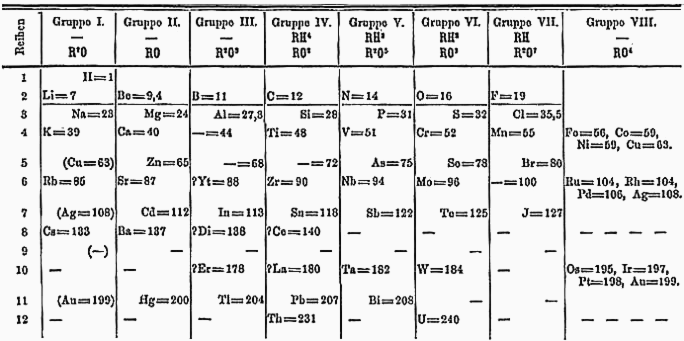
Mendeleev's periodic table, 1871

== Priority dispute and recognition ==
In 1881, Mendeleev claimed priority over Meyer for the periodic table as follows:

That person is rightly regarded as the creator of a particular scientific idea who perceives not merely its philosophical, but its real aspect, and who understands so to illustrate the matter so that everyone can become convinced of its truth. Then alone the idea, like matter, becomes indestructible.

=== Mendeleev's predictions and inability to incorporate the rare-earth metals ===
Mendeleev's predictions (Note: Scerri notes that this table "does not include elements such as astatine and actinium, which he [Mendeleev] predicted successfully but did not name. Neither does it include predictions that were represented just by dashes in Mendeleev’s periodic systems. Among some other failures, not included in the table, is an inert gas element between barium and tantalum, which would have been called ekaxenon, although Mendeleev did not refer to it as such.")
Name	Atomic weight		Modern name (year of discovery)
Name	Mendeleev	Modern	Modern name (year of discovery)
Ether	0.17	—	—
Coronium	0.4	—	—
Eka-boron	44	44.6	Scandium
Eka-cerium	54	—	—
Eka-aluminum	68	69.2	Gallium
Eka-silicon	72	72.0	Germanium
Eka-manganese	100	99	Technetium (1937)
Eka-niobium	142	—	—
Eka-molybdenum	146	—	—
Eka-cadmium	155	—	—
Eka-iodine	170	—	—
Tri-manganese	190	186	Rhenium (1925)
Eka-caesium	175	—	—
Dvi-tellurium	212	210	Polonium (1898)
Dvi-caesium	220	223	Francium (1939)
Eka-tantalum	235	231	Protactinium (1913)

Even as Mendeleev corrected positions of some elements, he thought that some relationships that he could find in his grand scheme of periodicity could not be found because some elements were still undiscovered, and that the properties of such undiscovered elements could be deduced from their expected relationships with other elements. In 1870, he first tried to characterize the yet undiscovered elements, and he gave detailed predictions for three elements, which he termed eka-boron, eka-aluminium, and eka-silicium; he also more briefly noted a few other expectations. It has been proposed that the prefixes eka, dvi, and tri, Sanskrit for one, two, and three, respectively, are a tribute to Pāṇini and other ancient Sanskrit grammarians for their invention of a periodic alphabet. In 1871, Mendeleev expanded his predictions further.

Compared to the rest of the work, Mendeleev's 1869 list misplaces seven then known elements: indium, thorium, and five rare-earth metals: yttrium, cerium, lanthanum, erbium, and didymium. The last two were later found to be mixtures of two different elements; ignoring those would allow him to restore the logic of increasing atomic weight. These elements (all thought to be divalent at the time) puzzled Mendeleev as they did not show a regular increase in valency despite their seemingly consequential atomic weights. Mendeleev grouped them together, thinking of them as of a particular kind of series. (Note: He noted similarity despite sequential atomic weights; he termed such sequences as primary groups (as opposed to regular secondary groups, such as the halogens and the alkali metals). Other primary groups were rhodium, ruthenium, and palladium; and iridium, osmium, and platinum.) In early 1870, he decided that the weights for these elements must be wrong and that the rare-earth metals should be trivalent (which accordingly increased their predicted atomic weights by half). He measured the heat capacity of indium, uranium, and cerium to demonstrate their higher assumed valency (which was soon confirmed by Prussian chemist Robert Bunsen). Mendeleev treated the change by assessing each element to an individual place in his system of the elements rather than continuing to treat them as a series.

Mendeleev noticed that there was a significant difference in atomic mass between cerium and tantalum with no element between them; his consideration was that between them, there was a row of yet undiscovered elements, which would display similar properties to those elements which were to be found above and below them: for instance, an eka-molybdenum would behave as a heavier homolog of molybdenum and a lighter homolog of wolfram (the name under which Mendeleev knew tungsten). This row would begin with a trivalent lanthanum, a tetravalent cerium, and a pentavalent didymium. However, the higher valency for didymium had not been established, and Mendeleev tried to do so himself. Having had no success in that, he abandoned his attempts to incorporate the rare-earth metals in late 1871 and embarked on his grand idea of luminiferous ether. His idea was carried on by Austrian-Hungarian chemist Bohuslav Brauner, who sought to find a place in the periodic table for the rare-earth metals; Mendeleev later referred to him as to "one of the true consolidators of the periodic law". (Note: Mendeleev referred to Brauner in this manner after Brauner measured the atomic weight of tellurium and obtained the value 125. Mendeleev had thought that due to the properties tellurium and iodine display, the latter should be the heavier one while the contemporary data pointed otherwise (tellurium was assessed with the value of 128, and iodine 127). Later measurements by Brauner himself, however, showed the correctness of the original measurement; Mendeleev doubted it for the rest of his life.)

In addition to the predictions of scandium, gallium, and germanium that were quickly realized, Mendeleev's 1871 table left many more spaces for undiscovered elements, though he did not provide detailed predictions of their properties. In total, he predicted eighteen elements, though only half corresponded to elements that were later discovered. In the years following Mendeleev's publication, the Indian chemist Prafulla Chandra Ray began working with English geologist Thomas Henry Holland to search for "certain rare Indian minerals in the expectation that one or two new elements might turn up and thus fill up the gap in Mendeleev's periodic table."

=== Priority of discovery ===
None of the proposals were accepted immediately, and many contemporary chemists found it too abstract to have any meaningful value. Of those chemists that proposed their categorizations, Mendeleev strove to back his work and promote his vision of periodicity, Meyer did not promote his work very actively, and Newlands did not make a single attempt to gain recognition abroad.

Both Mendeleev and Meyer created their respective tables for their pedagogical needs; the difference between their tables is well explained by the fact that the two chemists sought to use a formalized system to solve different problems. Mendeleev's intent was to aid composition of his textbook, Foundations of Chemistry, whereas Meyer was rather concerned with presentation of theories. Mendeleev's predictions emerged outside of the pedagogical scope in the realm of journal science, while Meyer made no predictions at all and explicitly stated his table and his textbook it was contained in, Modern Theories, should not be used for prediction in order to make the point to his students to not make too many purely theoretically constructed projections.

Mendeleev and Meyer differed in temperament, at least when it came to promotion of their respective works. Boldness of Mendeleev's predictions was noted by some contemporary chemists, however skeptical they may have been. Meyer referred to Mendeleev's "boldness" in an edition of Modern Theories, whereas Mendeleev mocked Meyer's indecisiveness to predict in an edition of Foundations of Chemistry.

=== Recognition of Mendeleev's table ===
Eventually, the periodic table was appreciated for its descriptive power and for finally systematizing the relationship between the elements, although such appreciation was not universal. In 1881, Mendeleev and Meyer had an argument via an exchange of articles in British journal Chemical News over priority of the periodic table, which included an article from Mendeleev, one from Meyer, one of critique of the notion of periodicity, and many more. In 1882, the Royal Society in London awarded the Davy Medal to both Mendeleev and Meyer for their work to classify the elements; although two of Mendeleev's predicted elements had been discovered by then, Mendeleev's predictions were not at all mentioned in the prize rationale.

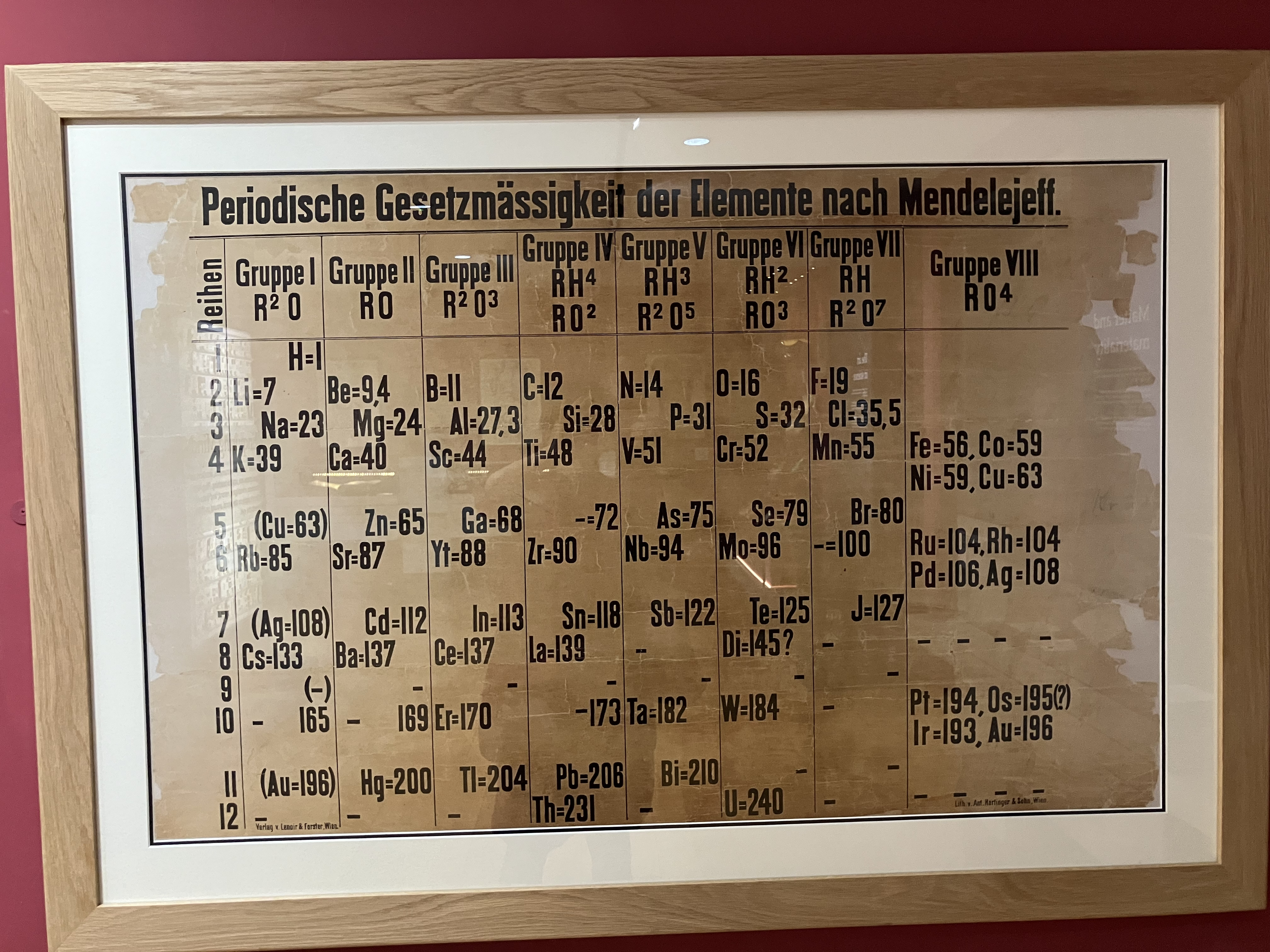
The oldest surviving periodic table for educational purpose, between 1879 and 1886. Wardlaw Museum, the University of St Andrews. It includes gallium and scandium, but not germanium. Wallchart discovery

Mendeleev's eka-aluminium was discovered in 1875 and became known as gallium; eka-boron and eka-silicium were discovered in 1879 and 1886, respectively, and were named scandium and germanium. Mendeleev was even able to correct some initial measurements with his predictions, including the first prediction of gallium, which matched eka-aluminium fairly closely but had a different density. Mendeleev advised the discoverer, French chemist Paul-Émile Lecoq de Boisbaudran, to measure the density again; de Boisbaudran was initially skeptical (not least because he thought Mendeleev was trying to take credit from him) but eventually admitted the correctness of the prediction. Mendeleev contacted all three discoverers; all three noted the close similarity of their discovered elements with Mendeleev's predictions, with the last of them, German chemist Clemens Winkler, admitting this suggestion was not first made by Mendeleev or himself after the correspondence with him, but by a different person, German chemist Hieronymous Theodor Richter. (Note: Notably, Mendeleev did not immediately identify germanium as eka-silicium. Winkler explained, "The present case, however, shows quite clearly how deceptive it can be to use analogies, because the tetradic value of germanium has meanwhile become an irrefutable fact, and there can be no doubt that the new element is nothing other than "eka-silicium" predicted by Mendeleev fifteen years ago. This identification comes from the short and still very imperfect characteristic of germanium that I gave at the beginning and was first decisively pronounced by V. v. Richter. Almost at the same time, Mendeleev, the deserving creator of the periodic system, commented that although several of the properties of germanium I mentioned reminded of those of eka-silicium, the observed liquidity of the element indicated the possibility of placing it elsewhere in the periodic system. Lothar Meyer declared the germanium to be eka-silicium from the beginning, adding that according to the atomic volume curve produced by it, contrary to Mendeleev's assumption, it had to be easily meltable and probably also easy to vaporize. At that time the germanium had not yet been presented in the reguline state; it is all the more remarkable that, as will be shown below, Lothar Meyer's condition has, to some extent, really come true.") Some contemporary chemists were not convinced by these discoveries, noting the dissimilarities between the new elements and the predictions or claiming those similarities that did exist were coincidental. However, success of Mendeleev's predictions helped spread the word about his periodic table. Later, chemists used the successes of these Mendeleev's predictions to justify his table.

By 1890, Mendeleev's periodic table had been universally recognized as a piece of basic chemical knowledge. Apart from his own correct predictions, a number of aspects may have contributed to this, such as the correct accommodation of many elements whose atomic weights were thought to have wrong values but were later corrected. The debate on the position of the rare-earth metals helped spur the discussion about the table as well. (Note: Meyer's tables, in contrast, did not at all attempt to incorporate those elements.) In 1889, Mendeleev noted at the Faraday Lecture to the Royal Institution in London that he had not expected to live long enough "to mention their discovery to the Chemical Society of Great Britain as a confirmation of the exactitude and generality of the periodic law".

== Inert gases and ether ==
The great value of Newland's, Mendeleef's, and Lothar Meyer's generalisation, known as the periodic arrangement of the elements, is universally acknowledged. But a study of this arrangement, it must be allowed, is a somewhat tantalising pleasure; for, although the properties of elements do undoubtedly vary qualitatively, and, indeed, show approximate quantitative relations to their position in the periodic table, yet there are inexplicable deviations from regularity, which hold forth hopes of the discovery of a still more far-reaching generalisation. What that generalisation may be is not yet to be divined; but that it must underlie what is known, and must furnish a clue to the explanation of irregularities, cannot be disputed.

— British chemists William Ramsay and Morris Travers in 1900 discussion of their research of new inert gases

=== Inert gases ===
British chemist Henry Cavendish, the discoverer of hydrogen in 1766, discovered that air is composed of more gases than nitrogen and oxygen. He recorded these findings in 1784 and 1785; among them, he found a then-unidentified gas less reactive than nitrogen. Helium was first reported in 1868; the report was based on the new technique of spectroscopy; some spectral lines in light emitted by the Sun did not match those of any of the known elements. Mendeleev was not convinced by this finding since variance of temperature led to change of intensity of spectral lines and their location on the spectrum. This opinion was held by some other scientists of the day, some of whom believed the spectral lines were due to a particular state of hydrogen existing in the Sun's atmosphere. Others believed the spectral lines could belong to an element that occurred on the Sun but not on Earth; some believed it was yet to be found on Earth.

In 1894, British chemist William Ramsay and British physicist Lord Rayleigh isolated argon from air and determined that it was a new element. Argon, however, did not engage in any chemical reactions and was—highly unusually for a gas—monatomic; (Note: The only other monatomic gas known at the time was vaporized mercury.) it did not fit into the periodic law and thus challenged the very notion of it. Not all scientists immediately accepted this report; Mendeleev's original response was that argon was a triatomic form of nitrogen rather than an element of its own. While the notion of a possibility of a group between that of halogens and that of alkali metals had existed (some scientists believed that several atomic weight values between halogens and alkali metals were missing, especially since places in this half of group VIII remained vacant), argon did not easily match the position between chlorine and potassium because its atomic weight exceeded those of both chlorine and potassium. Other explanations were proposed; for example, Ramsay supposed argon could be a mixture of different gases. For a while, Ramsay believed argon could be a mixture of three gases of similar atomic weights; this triad would resemble the triad of iron, cobalt, and nickel, and be similarly placed in group VIII. Certain that shorter periods contain triads of gases at their ends, Ramsay suggested in 1898 the existence of a gas between helium and argon with an atomic weight of 20; after its discovery later that year (it was named neon), Ramsay continued to interpret it as a member of a horizontal triad at the end of that period.

In 1896, Ramsay tested a report of American chemist William Francis Hillebrand, who found a stream of an unreactive gas from a sample of uraninite. Wishing to prove it was nitrogen, Ramsay analyzed a different uranium mineral, cleveite, and found a new element, which he named krypton. This finding was corrected by British chemist William Crookes, who matched its spectrum to that of the Sun's helium. Following this discovery, Ramsay, using fractional distillation to separate the components air, discovered several more such gases in 1898: metargon, krypton, neon, and xenon; detailed spectroscopic analysis of the first of these demonstrated it was argon contaminated by a carbon-based impurity. Ramsay was initially skeptical about the existence of gases heavier than argon, and the discovery of krypton and xenon came as a surprise to him; however, Ramsay accepted his own discovery, and the five newly discovered inert gases (now noble gases) were placed in a single column in the periodic table. Although Mendeleev's table predicted several undiscovered elements, it did not predict the existence of such inert gases, and Mendeleev originally rejected those findings as well. (Note: Mendeleev did consider that some atomic weight values could be missing from the set of known values. However, Mendeleev could not have made a prediction of a group of unreactive gases in a fashion similar to the one in which he made his predictions on reactive elements and their chemical properties.)

=== Changes to the periodic table ===
Although the sequence of atomic weights suggested that inert gases should be located between halogens and alkali metals, and there were suggestions to put them into group VIII coming from as early as 1895, such placement contradicted one of Mendeleev's basic considerations, that of the highest oxides. Inert gases did not form any oxides, and no other compounds at all, and as such, their placement in a group where elements should form tetroxides was seen as merely auxiliary and not natural; Mendeleev doubted inclusion of those elements in group VIII. Later developments, particularly by British scientists, focused on correspondence of inert gases with halogens to their left and alkali metals to their right. In 1898, when only helium, argon, and krypton were definitively known, Crookes suggested these elements be placed in a single column between the hydrogen group and the fluorine group. In 1900, at the Prussian Academy of Sciences, Ramsay and Mendeleev discussed the new inert gases and their location in the periodic table; Ramsay proposed that these elements be put in a new group between halogens and alkali metals, to which Mendeleev agreed. Ramsay published an article after his discussions with Mendeleev; the tables in it featured halogens to the left of inert gases and alkali metals to the right. Two weeks before that discussion, Belgian botanist Léo Errera had proposed to the Royal Academy of Science, Letters and Fine Arts of Belgium to put those elements in a new group 0. In 1902, Mendeleev wrote that those elements should be put in a new group 0; he said this idea was consistent with what Ramsay suggested to him and referred to Errera as to the first person to suggest the idea. Mendeleev himself added these elements to the table as group 0 in 1902, without disturbing the basic concept of the periodic table.

In 1905, Swiss chemist Alfred Werner resolved the dead zone of Mendeleev's table. He determined that the rare-earth elements (lanthanides), 13 of which were known, lay within that gap. Although Mendeleev knew of lanthanum, cerium, and erbium, they were previously unaccounted for in the table because their total number and exact order were not known; Mendeleev still could not fit them in his table by 1901. This was in part a consequence of their similar chemistry and the imprecise determination of their atomic masses. Combined with the lack of a known group of similar elements, this rendered the placement of the lanthanides in the periodic table difficult. This discovery led to a restructuring of the table and the first appearance of the 32-column form.

=== Ether ===
By 1904, Mendeleev's table rearranged several elements, and included the noble gases along with most other newly discovered elements. It still had the dead zone, and a row zero was added above hydrogen and helium to include coronium and the ether, which were widely believed to be elements at the time. Although the Michelson–Morley experiment in 1887 cast doubt on the possibility of a luminiferous ether as a space-filling medium, physicists set constraints for its properties. Mendeleev believed it to be a very light gas, with an atomic weight several orders of magnitude smaller than that of hydrogen. He also postulated that it would rarely interact with other elements, similar to the noble gases of his group zero, and instead permeate substances at a velocity of 2,250 kilometers (1,400 mi) per second. (Note: The notion of ether was disproven by German physicist Albert Einstein in 1905 with his special theory of relativity; the idea that ether did not exist was accepted in the scientific community rather quickly.)

Mendeleev was not satisfied with the lack of understanding of the nature of this periodicity; this would only be possible through the understanding of the composition of the atom. However, Mendeleev firmly believed that future would only develop the notion rather than challenge it and reaffirmed his belief in writing in 1902.

Early developments of Mendeleev's table

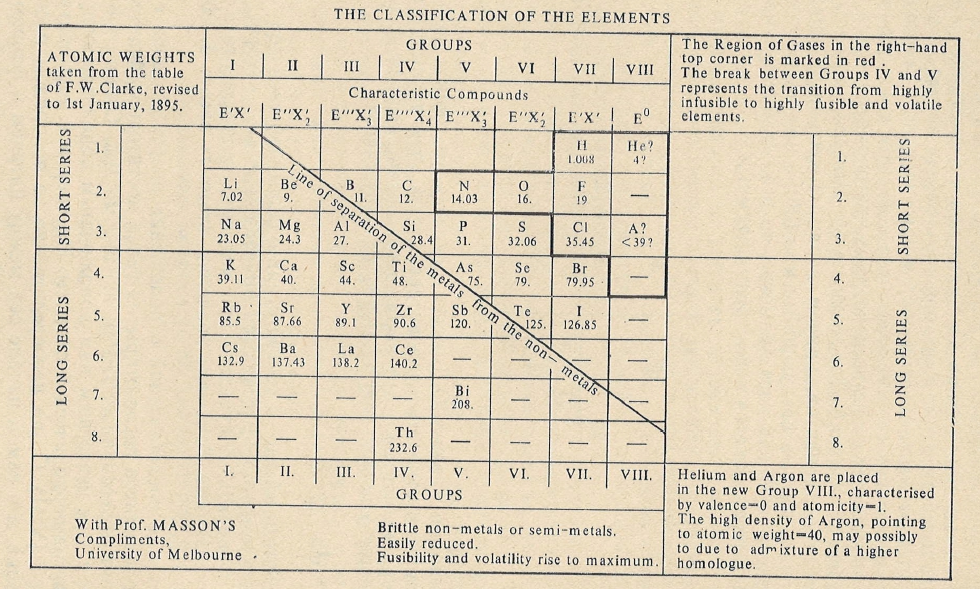
Main table of the periodic table published by Australian chemist David Orme Masson in 1895

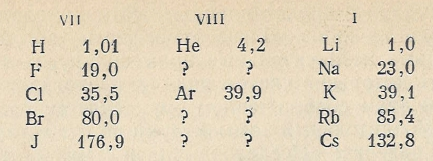
Fragment of a periodic table published by Ramsay in 1896

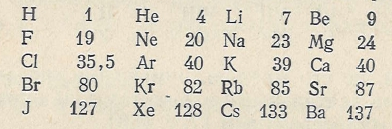
Fragment of a periodic table published by Ramsay in 1900

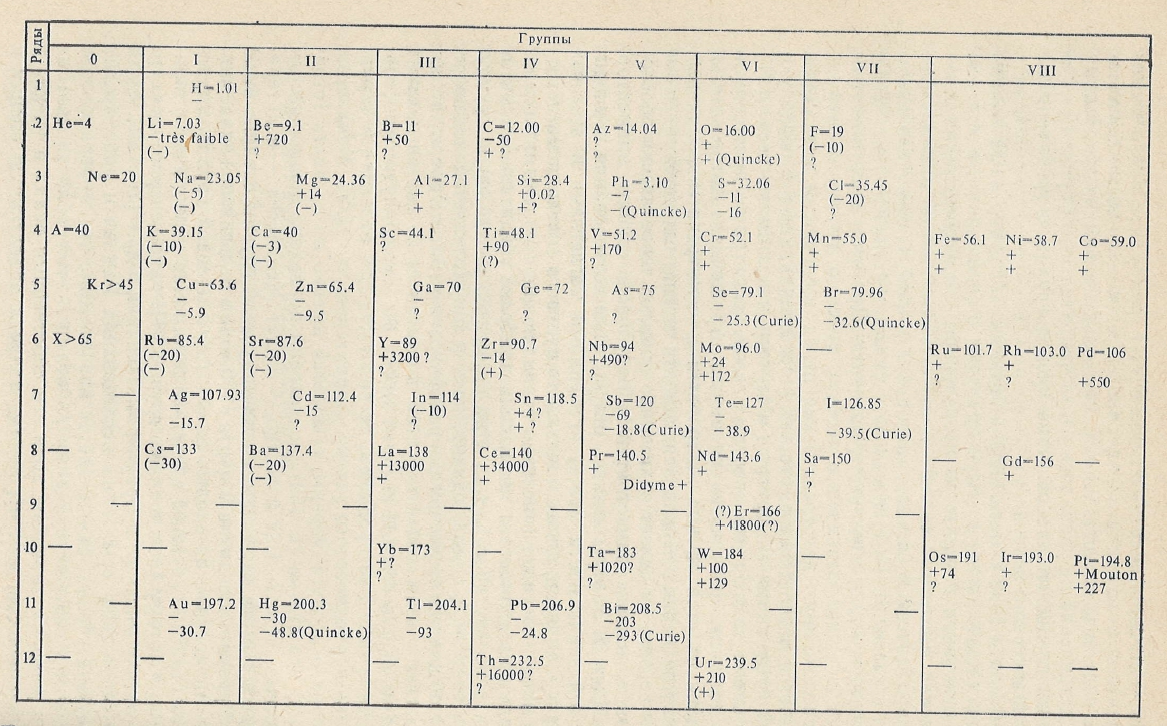
Periodic table as published by Errera in 1900

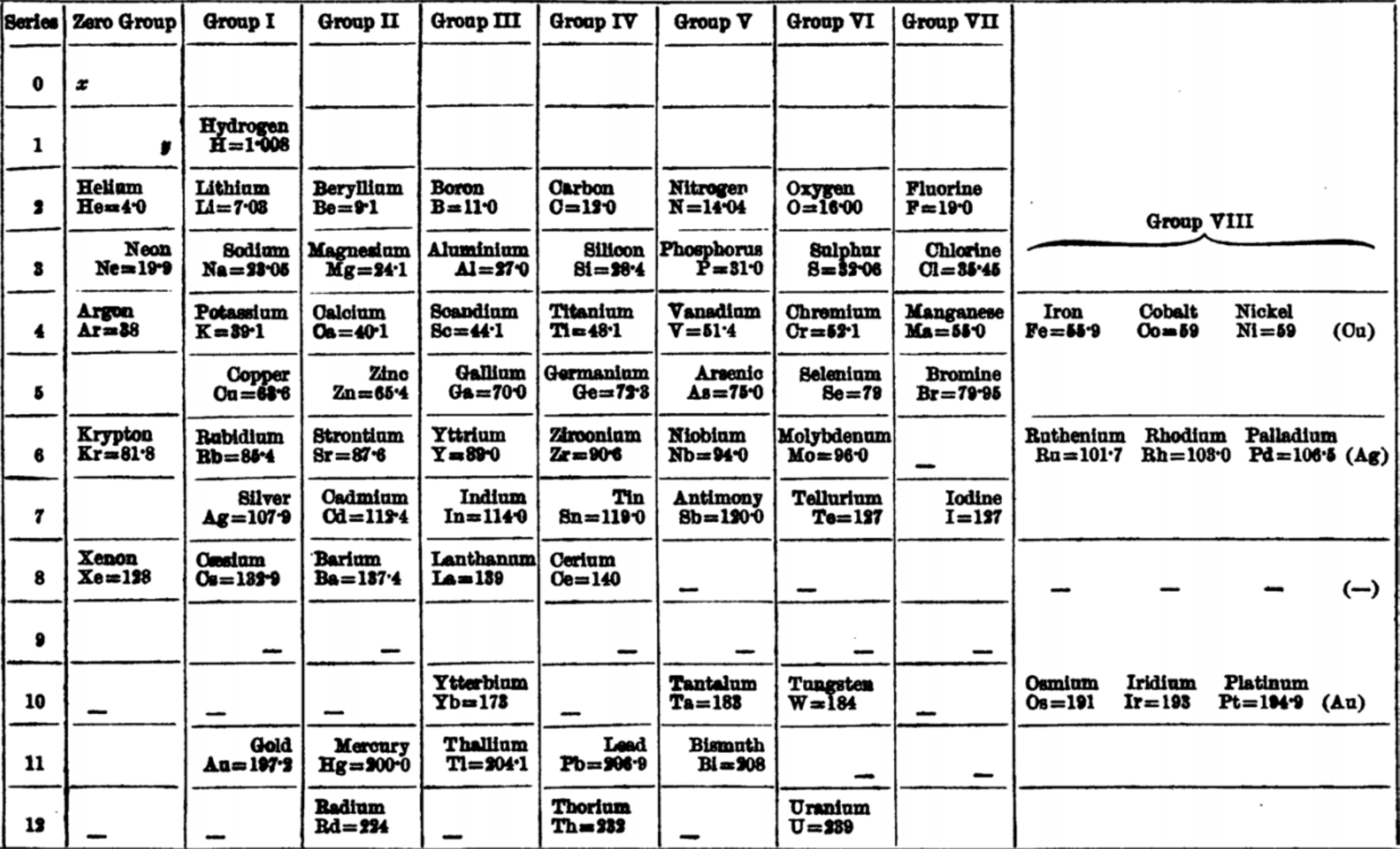
Mendeleev's 1904 table. It includes the noble gases in group 0, and it has two reserved gaps for coronium and ether.

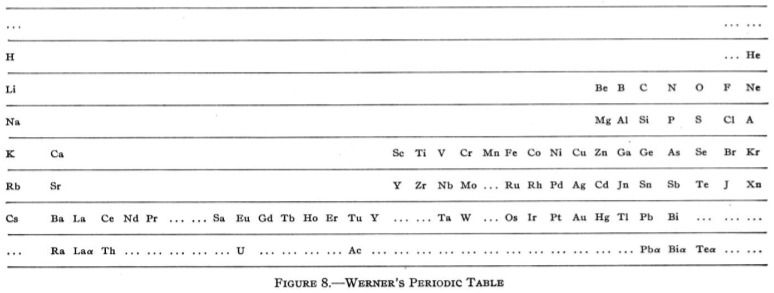
Werner's 32-column 1905 table. This table left spaces for many then-unknown elements, and several elements had their positions revised following advances in atomic theory.

== Atomic theory and isotopes ==
=== Radioactivity and isotopes ===
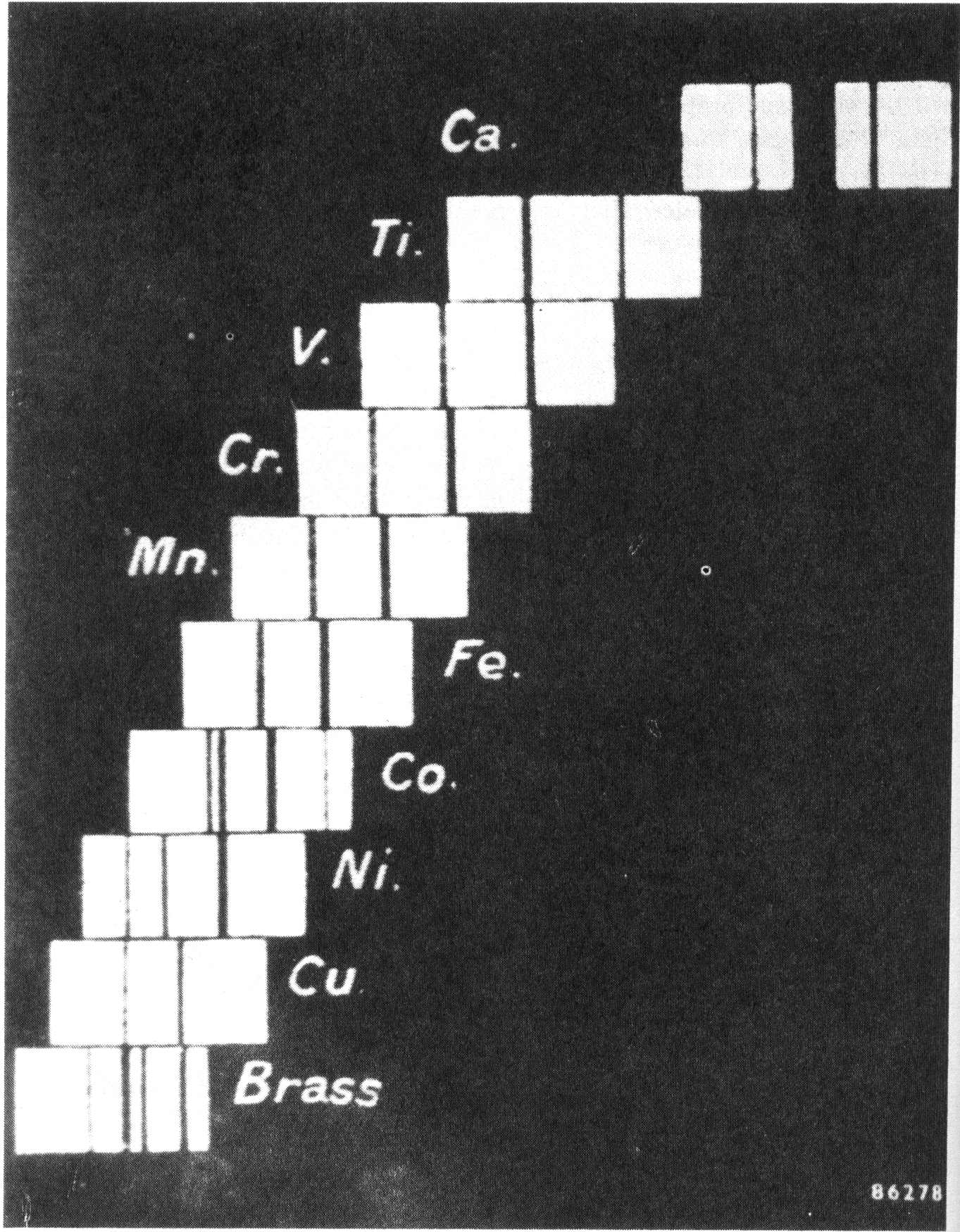
Photographic recording of the characteristic X-ray emission lines of elements with atomic number between 20 and 29 (From works of Henry Moseley)

In 1907 it was discovered that thorium and radiothorium, products of radioactive decay, were physically different but chemically identical; this led Frederick Soddy to propose in 1910 that they were the same element but with different atomic weights. Soddy later proposed to call these elements with complete chemical identity "isotopes".

The problem of placing isotopes in the periodic table had arisen beginning in 1900 when four radioactive elements were known: radium, actinium, thorium, and uranium. These radioactive elements (termed "radioelements") were accordingly placed at the bottom of the periodic table, as they were known to have greater atomic weights than stable elements, although their exact order was not known. Researchers believed there were still more radioactive elements yet to be discovered, and during the next decade, the decay chains of thorium and uranium were extensively studied. Many new radioactive substances were found, including the noble gas radon, and their chemical properties were investigated. By 1912, almost 50 different radioactive substances had been found in the decay chains of thorium and uranium. American chemist Bertram Boltwood proposed several decay chains linking these radioelements between uranium and lead. These were thought at the time to be new chemical elements, substantially increasing the number of known "elements" and leading to speculations that their discoveries would undermine the concept of the periodic table which had long been established to obey the octet rule. For example, there was not enough room between lead and uranium to accommodate these discoveries, even assuming that some discoveries were duplicates or incorrect identifications. It was also believed that radioactive decay violated one of the central principles of the periodic table, namely that chemical elements could not undergo transmutations and always had unique identities.

Soddy and Kazimierz Fajans, who had been following these developments, published in 1913 that although these substances emitted different radiation, many of these substances were identical in their chemical characteristics, so shared the same place in the periodic table. They became known as isotopes, from the Greek isos topos ("same place"). Austrian chemist Friedrich Paneth cited a difference between "real elements" (elements) and "simple substances" (isotopes), also determining that the existence of different isotopes was mostly irrelevant in determining chemical properties.

Following British physicist Charles Glover Barkla's discovery of characteristic X-rays emitted from metals in 1906, British physicist Henry Moseley considered a possible correlation between X-ray emissions and physical properties of elements. Moseley, along with Charles Galton Darwin, Niels Bohr, and George de Hevesy, proposed that the nuclear charge (Z) might be mathematically related to physical properties. The significance of these atomic properties was determined in the Geiger–Marsden experiments, in which the atomic nucleus and its charge were discovered, conducted between 1908 and 1913.

=== Rutherford model and atomic number ===
In 1913, amateur Dutch physicist Antonius van den Broek was the first to propose that the atomic number (nuclear charge) determined the placement of elements in the periodic table. He correctly determined the atomic number of all elements up to atomic number 50 (tin), though he made several errors with heavier elements. However, Van den Broek did not have any method to experimentally verify the atomic numbers of elements; thus, they were still believed to be a consequence of atomic weight, which remained in use in ordering elements.

Moseley was determined to test Van den Broek's hypothesis. After a year of investigation of the characteristic x-rays of various elements, he found a relationship between the X-ray wavelength of an element and its atomic number. With this, Moseley obtained the first accurate measurements of atomic numbers and determined an absolute sequence to the elements, allowing him to restructure the periodic table. Moseley's research immediately resolved discrepancies between atomic weight and chemical properties, where sequencing strictly by atomic weight would result in groups with inconsistent chemical properties. For example, his measurements of X-ray wavelengths enabled him to correctly place argon (Z = 18) before potassium (Z = 19), cobalt (Z = 27) before nickel (Z = 28), as well as tellurium (Z = 52) before iodine (Z = 53), in line with periodic trends. The determination of atomic numbers also clarified the order of chemically similar rare-earth elements; it was also used to confirm that Georges Urbain's claimed discovery of a new rare-earth element (celtium) was invalid, earning Moseley acclamation for this technique.

Swedish physicist Karl Siegbahn continued Moseley's work for elements heavier than gold (Z = 79), and found that the heaviest known element at the time, uranium, had atomic number 92. In determining the largest identified atomic number, gaps in the atomic number sequence were conclusively determined where an atomic number had no known corresponding element; the gaps occurred at atomic numbers 43 (technetium), 61 (promethium), 72 (hafnium), 75 (rhenium), 85 (astatine), and 87 (francium).

=== Electron shell and quantum mechanics ===
In 1914, Swedish physicist Johannes Rydberg noticed that the atomic numbers of the noble gases was equal to doubled sums of squares of simple numbers: 2 = 2·1^{2}, 10 = 2(1^{2} + 2^{2}), 18 = 2(1^{2} + 2^{2} + 2^{2}), 36 = 2(1^{2} + 2^{2} + 2^{2} + 3^{2}), 54 = 2(1^{2} + 2^{2} + 2^{2} + 3^{2} + 3^{2}), 86 = 2(1^{2} + 2^{2} + 2^{2} + 3^{2} + 3^{2} + 4^{2}). This finding was accepted as an explanation of the fixed lengths of periods and eventually paved the way to repositioning of the noble gases from the left edge of the table, in group 0, to the right, in group VIII. Unwillingness of the noble gases to engage in chemical reaction was explained in the alluded stability of closed noble gas electron configurations; from this notion emerged the octet rule originally referred to as Abegg's Rule of 1904. Among the notable works that established the importance of the periodicity of eight were the valence bond theory, published in 1916 by American chemist Gilbert N. Lewis and the octet theory of chemical bonding, published in 1919 by American chemist Irving Langmuir. The chemists' approach during the period of the Old Quantum Theory (1913 to 1925) was incorporated into the understanding of the electron shells and orbitals under current quantum mechanics. In his 1919 paper, Langmuir postulated the existence of "cells", which we now call atomic orbitals, and these were arranged in "equidistant layers" which we now call electron shells. These postulates were introduced on the basis of Rydberg's rule which Niels Bohr had used not in chemistry, but in physics, to apply to the orbits of electrons around the nucleus. The Langmuir paper introduced the rule as 2N^{2} where N was a positive integer.

British chemist Charles Rugeley Bury made the next major step toward the modern theory in 1921, by suggesting that eight and eighteen electrons in a shell form stable configurations. Bury's scheme was built upon that of earlier chemists and was a chemical model. Bury proposed that the electron configurations in transitional elements depended upon the valency electrons in their outer shell. In some early papers, the model was called the "Bohr-Bury Atom". He introduced the word transition to describe the elements now known as transition metals or transition elements.

In the 1910s and 1920s, pioneering research into quantum mechanics led to new developments in atomic theory and small changes to the periodic table. In the 19th century, Mendeleev had already asserted that there was a fixed periodicity of eight, and expected a mathematical correlation between atomic number and chemical properties. The Bohr model was developed beginning 1913, and championed the idea of electron configurations that determine chemical properties. Bohr proposed that elements in the same group behaved similarly because they have similar electron configurations, and that noble gases had filled valence shells; this forms the basis of the modern octet rule. Bohr's study of spectroscopy and chemistry was not usual among theoretical atomic physicists. Even Rutherford told Bohr that he was struggling "to form an idea of how you arrive at your conclusions". This is because none of the quantum mechanical equations describe the number of electrons per shell and orbital. Bohr acknowledged that he was influenced by the work of Walther Kossel, who in 1916 was the first to establish an important connection between the quantum atom and the periodic table. He noticed that the difference between the atomic numbers 2, 10, 18 of the first three noble gases, helium, neon, argon, was 8, and argued that the electrons in such atoms orbited in "closed shells". The first contained only 2 electrons, the second and third, 8 each. Bohr's research then led Austrian physicist Wolfgang Pauli to investigate the length of periods in the periodic table in 1924. Pauli demonstrated that this was not the case. Instead, the Pauli exclusion principle was developed, not upon a mathematical basis, but upon the previous developments in alignment with chemistry. This rule states that no electrons can coexist in the same quantum state, and showed, in conjunction with empirical observations, the existence of four quantum numbers and the consequence on the order of shell filling. This determines the order in which electron shells are filled and explains the periodicity of the periodic table.

British chemist Charles Bury is credited with the first use of the term transition metal in 1921 to refer to elements between the main-group elements of groups II and III. He explained the chemical properties of transition elements as a consequence of the filling of an inner subshell rather than the valence shell. This proposition, based upon the work of American chemist Gilbert N. Lewis, suggested the appearance of the d subshell in period 4 and the f subshell in period 6, lengthening the periods from 8 to 18 and then 18 to 32 elements, thus explaining the position of the lanthanides in the periodic table.

=== Proton and neutron ===
The discovery of proton and neutron demonstrated that an atom was divisible; this rendered Lavoisier's definition of a chemical element obsolete. A chemical element is defined today as a species of atoms with a consistent number of protons and that number is now known to be precisely the atomic number of an element. The discovery also explained the mechanism of several types of radioactive decay, such as alpha decay.

Eventually, it was proposed that protons and neutrons were made of even smaller particles called quarks; their discovery explained the transmutation of neutrons into protons in beta decay.

== From short form into long form (into -A and -B groups) ==
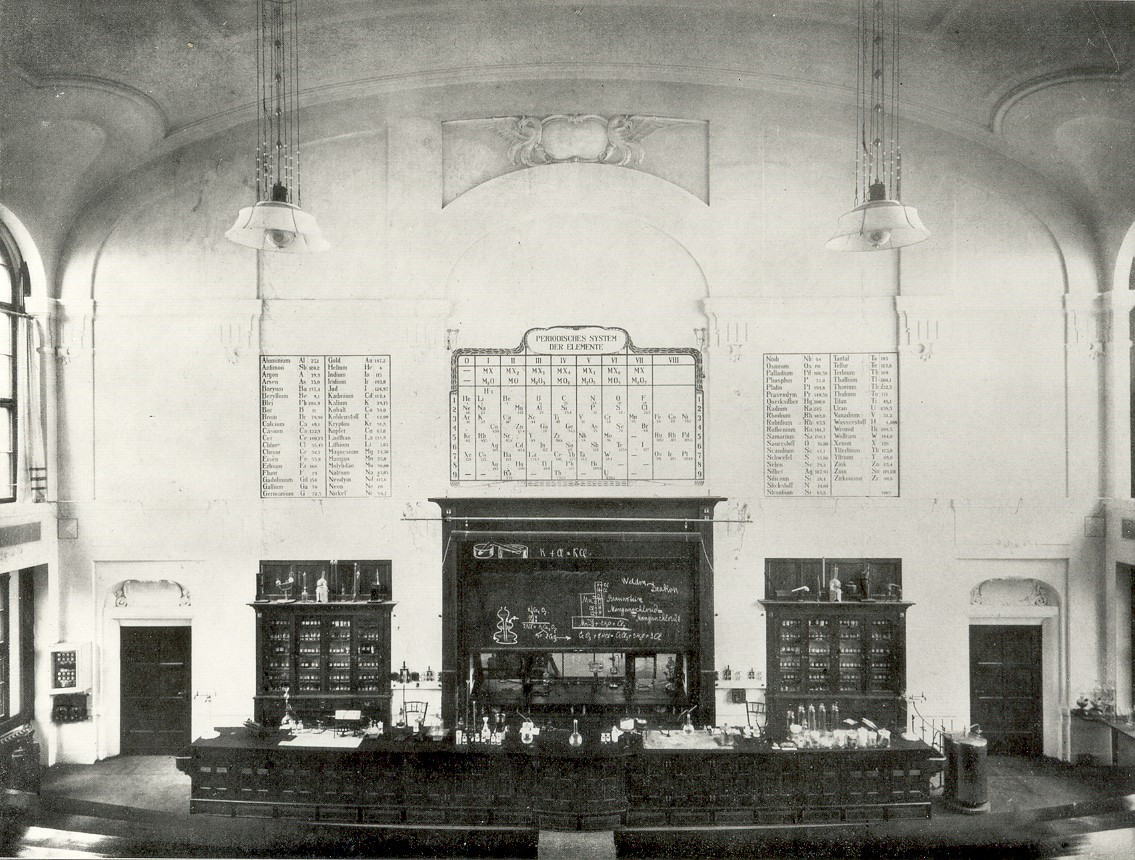
The periodic table on the wall of a chemistry lecture hall in Munich, Germany (1909)

Circa 1925, the periodic table changed by shifting some Reihen (series) to the right, into an extra set of columns (groups). The original groups I–VII were repeated, distinguished by adding "A" and "B". Group VIII (with three columns) remained sole.

Thus, Reihen 4 and 5 were shifted, and together formed new period 4 with groups IA–VIIA, VIII, IB–VIIB.

Development of Reihen/periods and Gruppen/groups in the Periodic table 1871–modern
modern (long):	IUPAC group	1	2	no number	3	4	5	6	7	8	9	10	×	11	12	13	14	15	16	17	18
1900+ (long):	old IUPAC (A–B, Europe)	IA	IIA		IIIA	IVA	VA	VIA	VIIA	VIII			×	IB	IIB	IIIB	IVB	VB	VIB	VIIB	0
1900+ (long):	CAS (A–B–A, US)	IA	IIA		IIIB	IVB	VB	VIB	VIIB	VIIIB			×	IB	IIB	IIIA	IVA	VA	VIA	VIIA	VIIIA
1871 (short)→	Gruppe	I	II	[ ]	III	IV	V	VI	VII	VIII				I	II	III	IV	V	VI	VII	0
Period ①	Reihe 1	H																			He
Period ②	Reihe 2	Li	Be													B	C	N	O	F	Ne
Period ③	Reihe 3	Na	Mg													Al	Si	P	S	Cl	Ar
Period ④	Reihe 4	K	Ca		–Sc	Ti	V	Cr	Mn	Fe	Co	Ni	Cu^{(1st)}								
Period ④	Reihe 5													(Cu)^{(2nd)}	Zn	– Ga	– Ge	As	Se	Br	Kr
Period ⑤	Reihe 6	Rb	Sr		Yt[=Y]	Zr	Nb	Mo	–([Tc])	Ru	Rh	Pd	Ag^{(1st)}								
Period ⑤	Reihe 7													(Ag)^{(2nd)}	Cd	In	Sn	Sb	Te	J[=I]	Xe
Period ⑥	Reihe 8	Cs	Ba	[La–Lu]	~~?Di~~[~~La~~]	~~?Ce~~[~~Ce~~]	—	—	—	—	—	—	—^{(1st)}								
Period ⑥	Reihe 9													(—)^{(2nd)}	—	—	—	—	—	—	
Period ⑥	Reihe 10	—	—		~~?Er~~ ~~Yb~~ ([Lu])	~~?La~~ – ([Hf])	Ta	W	–([Re])	Os	Ir	Pt	Au^{(1st)}								
Period ⑥	Reihe 11													(Au)^{(2nd)}	Hg	Tl	Pb	Bi	—[Po]	—[At]	[Rn]
Period ⑦	Reihe 12	—[Fr]	—Rd[=Ra]	[Ac–Lr]	—~~[Ac]~~	~~Th~~	—~~[Pa]~~	~~U~~	—	—	—	—	—								

Bold text	in Periodic Table 1871
Italic text	in Periodic Table 1906 (the last by Mendeleev)
Regular text (not bold)	added after 1906
	begin–end of 1871 Reihe
– Ga	Element predicted, later proven correct within Mendeleev's lifetime and added by him
– (Tc)	Element predicted, later proven correct posthumously
–	Element projected, but not predicted
~~strikethrough~~	Element predicted, later proven wrong due to – not an element ("?Di"), or –wrong position ("~~[Ac]~~") because of non-recognition of separate rare earth series
[ ]	Added or changed after 1871
Cu^{(1st)} × / (Cu)^{(2nd)}	Element mentioned twice: in Gruppe VIII and I. The 2nd mentioning survived, Gruppe/group VIII was reduced from four columns to three (×)
Published 1871, English version: "Reihen" translated as "Series" (that is, arrays with regularity not just rows). Reproduced in Scerri (2007), p. 111

== Later expansions and the end of the periodic table ==
We already feel that we have neared the moment when this [periodic] law begins to change, and change fast.

— Russian physicist Yuri Oganessian, co-discoverer of several superheavy elements, in 2019

=== Actinides ===
As early as 1913, Bohr's research on electronic structure led physicists such as Johannes Rydberg to extrapolate the properties of undiscovered elements heavier than uranium. Many agreed that the next noble gas after radon would most likely have the atomic number 118, from which it followed that the transition series in the seventh period should resemble those in the sixth. Although it was thought that these transition series would include a series analogous to the rare-earth elements, characterized by filling of the 5f shell, it was unknown where this series began. Predictions ranged from atomic number 90 (thorium) to 99, many of which proposed a beginning beyond the known elements (at or beyond atomic number 93). The elements from actinium to uranium were instead believed to form part of a fourth series of transition metals because of their high oxidation states; accordingly, they were placed in groups 3 through 6.

In 1940, neptunium and plutonium were the first transuranic elements to be discovered; they were placed in sequence beneath rhenium and osmium, respectively. However, preliminary investigations of their chemistry suggested a greater similarity to uranium than to lighter transition metals, challenging their placement in the periodic table. During his Manhattan Project research in 1943, American chemist Glenn T. Seaborg experienced unexpected difficulties in isolating the elements americium and curium, as they were believed to be part of a fourth series of transition metals. Seaborg wondered if these elements belonged to a different series, which would explain why their chemical properties, in particular the instability of higher oxidation states, were different from predictions. In 1945, against the advice of colleagues, he proposed a significant change to Mendeleev's table: the actinide series.

Seaborg's actinide concept of heavy element electronic structure proposed that the actinides form an inner transition series analogous to the rare-earth series of lanthanide elements—they would comprise the second row of the f-block (the 5f series), in which the lanthanides formed the 4f series. This facilitated chemical identification of americium and curium, and further experiments corroborated Seaborg's hypothesis; a spectroscopic study at the Los Alamos National Laboratory by a group led by American physicist Edwin McMillan indicated that 5f orbitals, rather than 6d orbitals, were indeed being filled. However, these studies could not unambiguously determine the first element with 5f electrons and therefore the first element in the actinide series; it was thus also referred to as the "thoride" or "uranide" series until it was later found that the series began with actinium.

In light of these observations and an apparent explanation for the chemistry of transuranic elements, and despite fear among his colleagues that it was a radical idea that would ruin his reputation, Seaborg nevertheless submitted it to Chemical & Engineering News and it gained widespread acceptance; new periodic tables thus placed the actinides below the lanthanides. Following its acceptance, the actinide concept proved pivotal in the groundwork for discoveries of heavier elements, such as berkelium in 1949. It also supported experimental results for a trend towards +3 oxidation states in the elements beyond americium—a trend observed in the analogous 4f series.

=== Expansions beyond period 7 ===
Seaborg's subsequent elaborations of the actinide concept theorized a series of superheavy elements in a transactinide series comprising elements from 104 to 121 and a superactinide series of elements from 122 to 153. He proposed an extended periodic table with an additional period of 50 elements (thus reaching element 168); this eighth period was derived from an extrapolation of the Aufbau principle and placed elements 121 to 138 in a g-block, in which a new g subshell would be filled. Seaborg's model, however, did not take into account relativistic effects resulting from high atomic number and electron orbital speed. Burkhard Fricke in 1971 and Pekka Pyykkö in 2010 used computer modeling to calculate the positions of elements up to Z = 172, and found that the positions of several elements were different from those predicted by Seaborg. Although models from Pyykkö and Fricke generally place element 172 as the next noble gas, there is no clear consensus on the electron configurations of elements beyond 120 and thus their placement in an extended periodic table. It is now thought that because of relativistic effects, such an extension will feature elements that break the periodicity in known elements, thus posing another hurdle to future periodic table constructs.

The discovery of tennessine in 2010 filled the last remaining gap in the seventh period. Any newly discovered elements will thus be placed in an eighth period.

Despite the completion of the seventh period, experimental chemistry of some transactinides has been shown to be inconsistent with the periodic law. In the 1990s, Ken Czerwinski at University of California, Berkeley observed similarities between rutherfordium and plutonium and between dubnium and protactinium, rather than a clear continuation of periodicity in groups 4 and 5. More recent experiments on copernicium and flerovium have yielded inconsistent results, some of which suggest that these elements behave more like the noble gas radon rather than mercury and lead, their respective congeners. As such, the chemistry of many superheavy elements has yet to be well characterized, and it remains unclear whether the periodic law can still be used to extrapolate the properties of undiscovered elements.

== See also ==
- History of chemistry
- Periodic systems of small molecules
- The Mystery of Matter: Search for the Elements (PBS film)
- Discovery of chemical elements
- Types of periodic tables

== Sources ==
- Gordin, M. D. (2012). "The Textbook Case of a Priority Dispute: D. I. Mendeleev, Lothar Meyer, and the Periodic System". In Biagioli, M.; Riskin, J. (eds.). Nature Engaged. Palgrave Macmillan. pp. 59–82. doi:10.1057/9780230338029_4. ISBN 978-1-349-28717-8.
- Mendeleev, D. I. (1870). Естественная система элементов и применение ее к указанию свойств неоткрытых элементов [The natural system of the elements and its application to indication of properties of unknown elements]. pp. 102–176.. Republished from Mendeleev, D. I. (1871). "Естественная система элементовъ и примѣненіе её къ указанію свойствъ неоткрытыхъ элементовъ" [The natural system of the elements and its application to indication of properties of unknown elements]. Journal of the Russian Physico-Chemical Society (in Russian). 3 (2): 25–56. Archived from the original on 17 March 2014.
- Mendeleev, D. I. (1871). Периодическая законность химических элементов [Periodic regularity of the chemical elements]. pp. 102–176.. Republished from Mendelejeff, D. (1871). "Die periodische Gesetzmässigkeit der Elemente" [Periodic regularity of the chemical elements]. Annalen der Chemie und Pharmacie (in German). Suppl. 8: 133–229.
- Petrov, L. P. (1981). Прогнозирование и размещение инертных элементов в периодической системе [Forecasting and placing of inert elements in the periodic system] (in Russian).
- Scerri, E. R. (2019). The Periodic Table: Its Story and Its Significance. Oxford University Press. ISBN 978-0-19-091436-3.
- Thyssen, Pieter; Binnemans, Koen (2015). "Mendeleev and the Rare-Earth Crisis". Philosophy of Chemistry (PDF). Boston Studies in the Philosophy and History of Science. Vol. 306. pp. 155–182. doi:10.1007/978-94-017-9364-3_11. ISBN 978-94-017-9363-6.
