= William Odling =

English chemist (1829–1921)

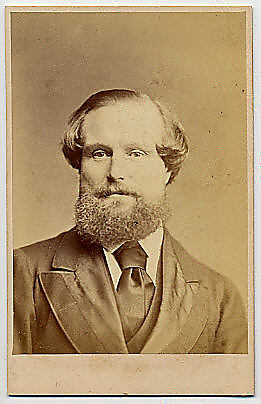
- William Odling
- Born: 5 September 1829; Southwark
- Died: 17 February 1921 (aged 91); Oxford
- Scientific career
- Fields: Chemistry
- Workplaces: St Bartholomew's Hospital Medical School Royal Institution Worcester College, Oxford

William Odling, FRS (5 September 1829 – 17 February 1921) was an English chemist who contributed to the development of the periodic table.

In the 1860s Odling, like many chemists, was working towards classifying the elements, an effort that would eventually lead to the periodic table of elements. He was intrigued by atomic weights and the periodic occurrence of chemical properties. William Odling and Lothar Meyer drew up tables similar, but with improvements on, Dmitri Mendeleev's original table. Odling drew up a table of elements using repeating units of seven elements, which bears a striking resemblance to Mendeleev's first table. The groups are horizontal, the elements are in order of increasing atomic weight and there are vacant slots for undiscovered ones. In addition, Odling overcame the tellurium-iodine problem and he even managed to get thallium, lead, mercury and platinum in the right groups - something that Mendeleev failed to do at his first attempt.

Odling failed to achieve recognition, however, since it is suspected that he, as Secretary of the Chemical Society of London, was instrumental in discrediting John Alexander Reina Newlands' efforts at getting his own periodic table published. One such unrecognised aspect was for the suggestion he, Odling, made in a lecture he gave at the Royal Institution in 1855 entitled The Constitution of Hydrocarbons in which he proposed a methane type for carbon (Proceedings of the Royal Institution, 1855, vol 2, pp. 63–66). August Kekulé made a similar suggestion in 1857, then in a subsequent paper later that same year proposed that carbon is a tetravalent element.

== Career ==
Odling became a Chemistry Lecturer at St Bartholomew's Hospital Medical School and a Demonstrator at Guy's Hospital Medical School in 1850. Leaving St Bartholomew's in 1868 he became a Fullerian Professor of Chemistry at the Royal Institution where in 1868 and 1870 he was invited to deliver the Royal Institution Christmas Lecture on The Chemical Changes of Carbon and Burning and Unburning respectively.

In 1872 he left the Royal Institution and became Waynflete Professor of Chemistry and a fellow of Worcester College, Oxford, where he stayed till his retirement in 1912.

Odling also served as a fellow (1848–1856), honorary secretary (1856–1869), vice-president (1869–1872) and president (1873–1875) of the Chemical Society of London as well as a censor (1878–1880 and 1882–1891), vice-president (1878–1880 and 1888–1891) and president (1883–1888) of the Institute of Chemistry.

In 1859 he was made a fellow of the Royal Society of London and in 1875 he was granted an honorary PhD by Leiden University, the Netherlands.

== See also ==
- History of the periodic table
