= Hilbrand =

Hilbrand is both a given name and a surname. Notable people with the name include:

- Hilbrand Boschma (1893–1976), Dutch zoologist and museum curator
- Hilbrand J. Groenewold (1910–1996), Dutch theoretical physicist
- Hilbrand Nawijn (born 1948), Dutch politician
- Sophie Hilbrand (born 1975), Dutch actress, television host and radio host

== See also ==
- Hillebrand
