= Döbereiner's lamp =

Lighter invented in 1823 by J. W. Döbereiner

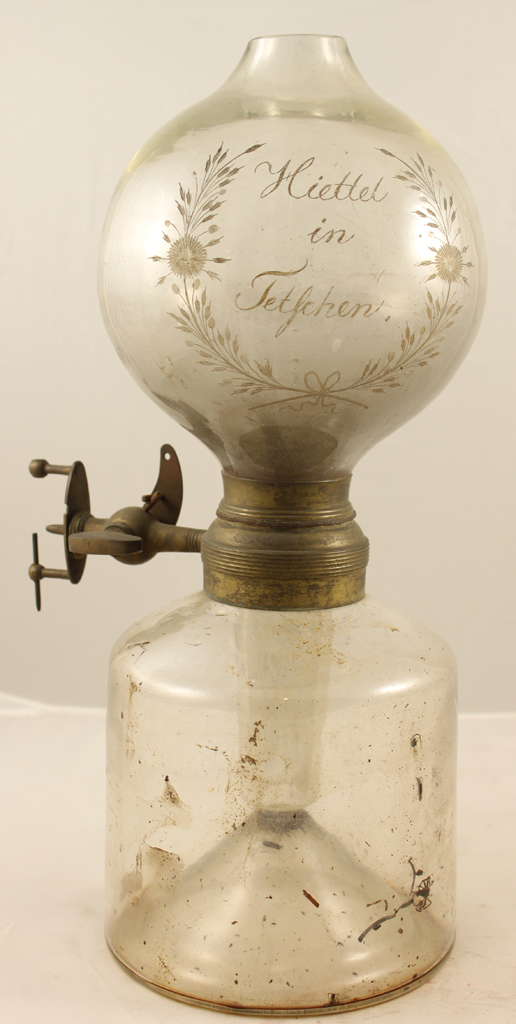
Döbereiner's lamp.

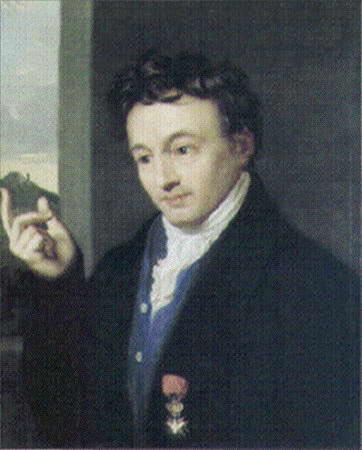
Johann Wolfgang Döbereiner (1825)

Döbereiner's lamp, also called a "tinderbox" ("Feuerzeug"), is a lighter invented in 1823 by the German chemist Johann Wolfgang Döbereiner. The lighter is based on the Fürstenberger lighter (invented in Basel in 1780; in which hydrogen gas is ignited by an electrostatically generated spark). Döbereiner's lamp was in production until ca. 1880. In the jar, similar to the Kipp's apparatus, zinc metal reacts with dilute sulfuric acid to produce hydrogen gas. When a valve is opened, a jet of hydrogen is released onto a platinum sponge. The sponge catalyzes a reaction with atmospheric oxygen, which heats the catalyst and ignites the hydrogen, producing a gentle flame.

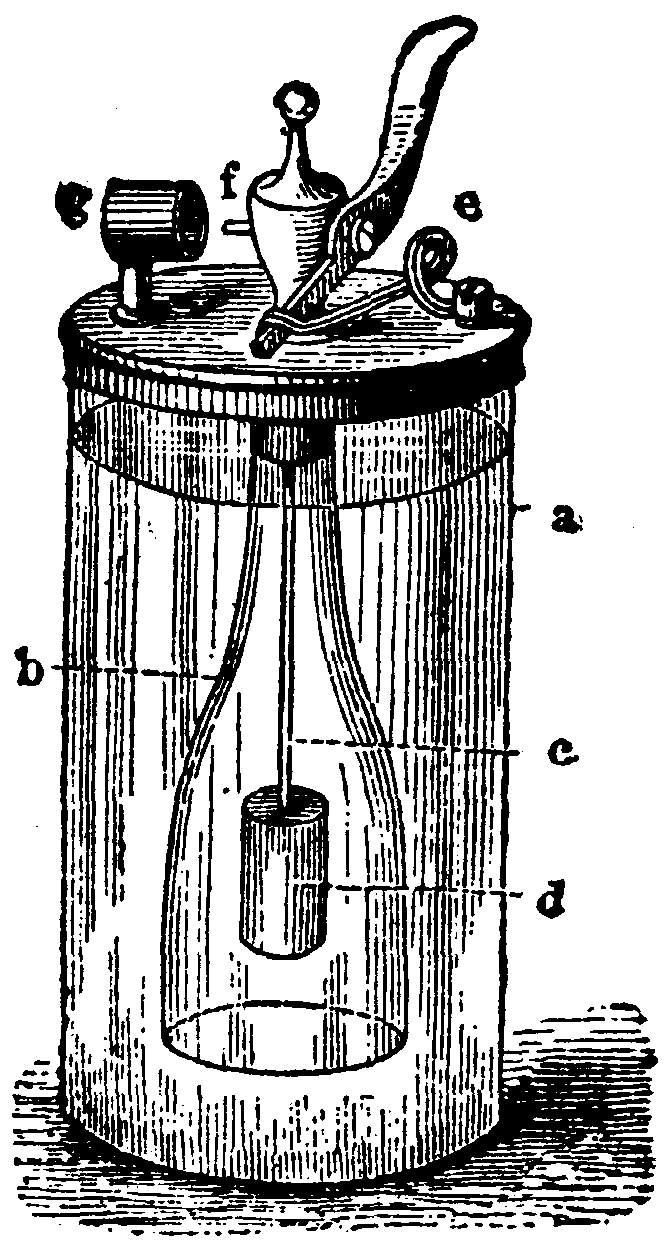
a. glass cylinder; b. open bottle; c. wire; d. zinc; e. stopcock; f. nozzle; g. platinum sponge

The Döbereiner's lamp is considered as the first commercial application of heterogeneous catalysis and was commercialized for lighting fires and pipes. The world's largest manufacturer of these lighters was Heinrich Gottfried Piegler from Schleiz in Thuringia (Germany). It is said that in the 1820s over a million of the "tinderboxes" were sold.

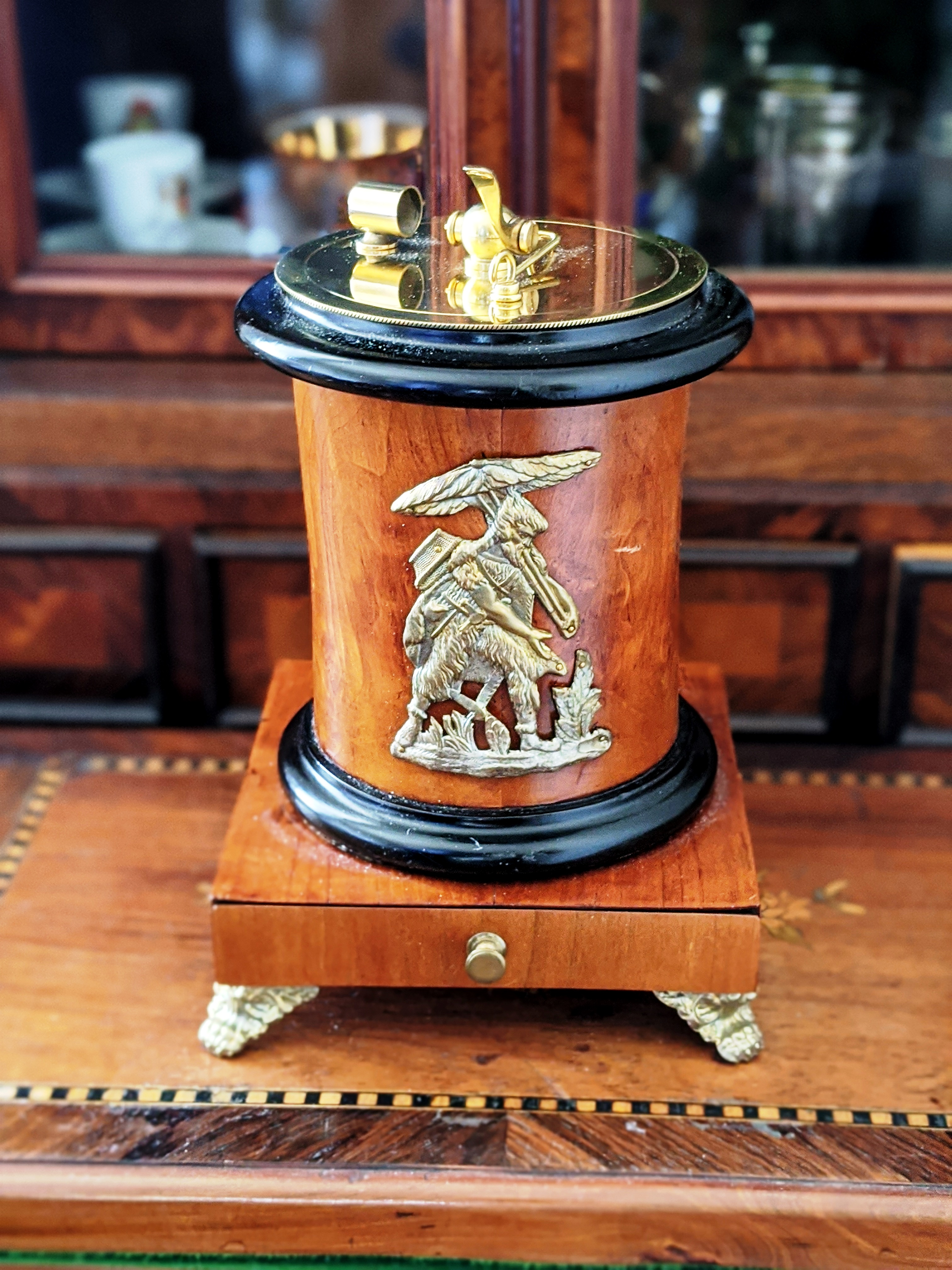
Doebereiner lamp (G. Piegler, 1830)

In Great Britain examples of the lighter are exhibited in the Science Museum in London, in Germany in the Deutsches Museum, the old pharmacy at Heidelberg Castle, the Kulturhistorisches Museum Schloss Merseburg, the Municipal Museum in Braunschweig, the Goethe National Museum in Weimar, the Museum Gunnar-Wester-Haus in Schweinfurt, the Astronomisch-Physikalisches Kabinett Kassel, the Regional Museum Bad Lobenstein, the Municipal Museum Zeulenroda, the Stadtmuseum Gera, the Mineralogical Collection in Jena, and at the Museum Bayerisches Vogtland in Hof, in the United States in the Amana Heritage Museum in Amana (CDP), Iowa.

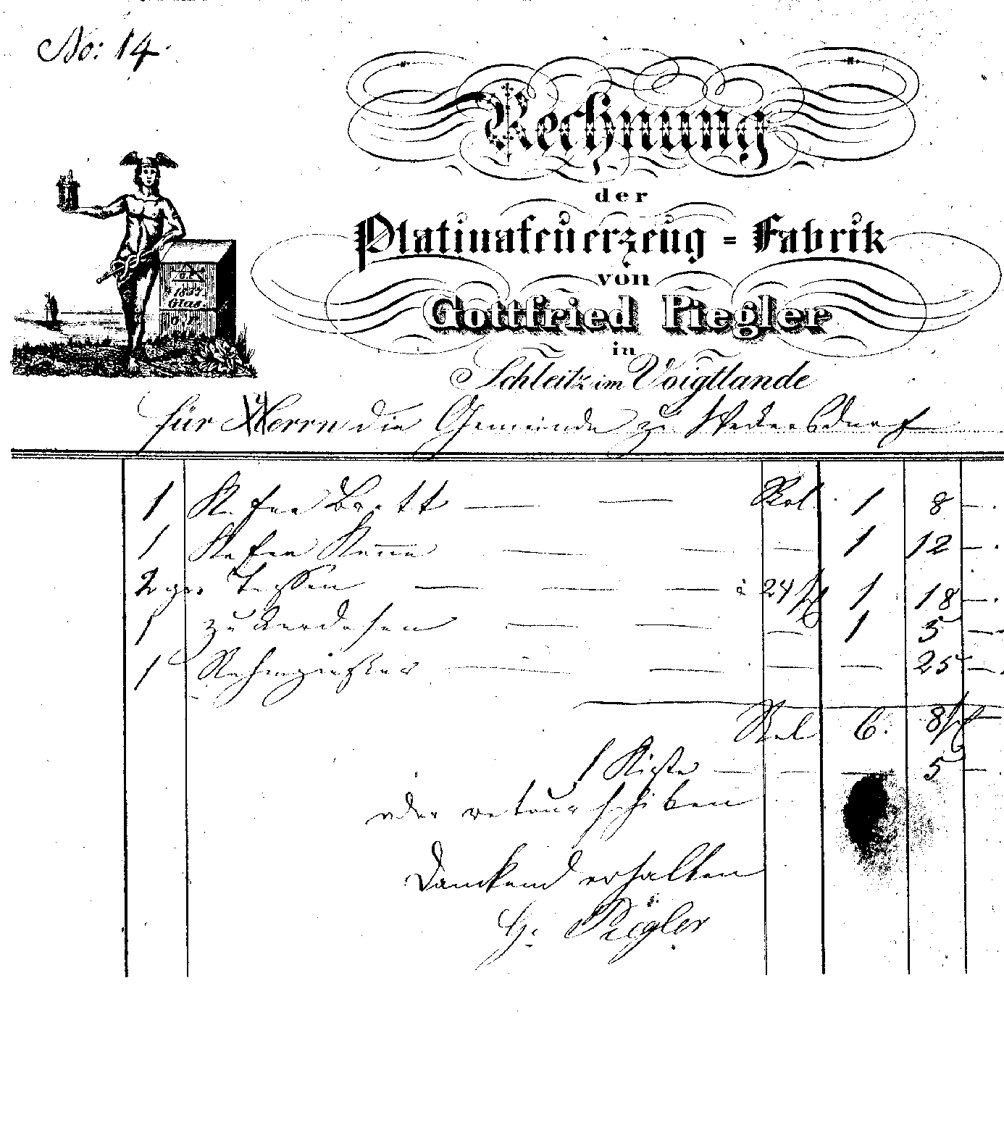
Invoice of the company Gottfried Piegler, Schleiz

== See also ==
- Timeline of hydrogen technologies
