= Döbereiner's triads =

Historical scientific theory

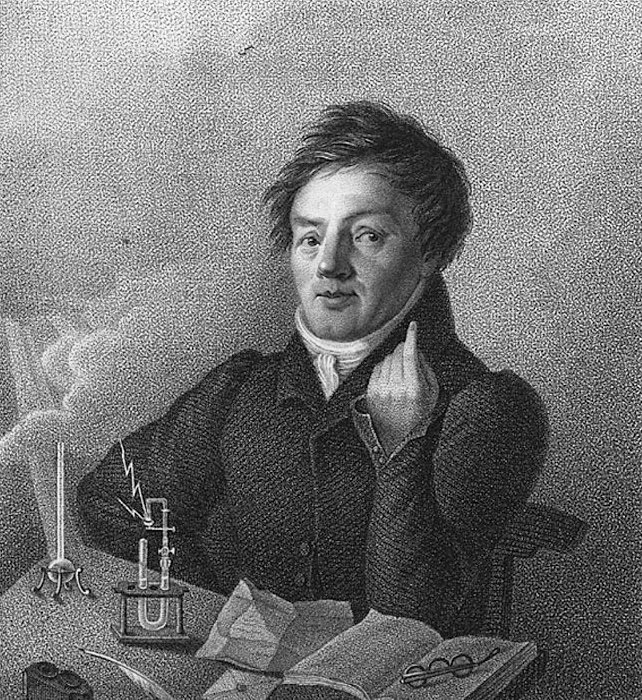
Johann Wolfgang Döbereiner, who attempted to sort the elements in an order which consisted of triads.

In the history of the periodic table, Döbereiner's triads were an early attempt to sort the elements into some logical order and sets based on their physical properties. They are analogous to the groups (columns) on the modern periodic table. 53 elements were known at his time.

In 1817, a letter by Ferdinand Wurzer reported Johann Wolfgang Döbereiner's observations of the alkaline earths; namely, that strontium had properties that were intermediate to those of calcium and barium.

"In der Gegend von Jena (bei Dornburg) … Schwerspaths seyn möchte." (In the area of Jena (near Dornburg) it is known that celestine has been discovered in large quantities. This gave Mr. Döbereiner cause to inquire rigorously into the stoichiometric value of strontium oxide by a great series of experiments. It turned out that it [i.e., the molar weight of strontium oxide] – if that of hydrogen is expressed by 1 or that of oxygen is expressed by the number 7.5 – is equal to 50. This number is, however, precisely the arithmetic mean of that which denotes the stoichiometric value of calcium oxide (= 27.55) and of that which denotes the stoichiometric value of barium oxide (= 72.5); namely (27.5 + 72.5) / 2 = 50. For a moment, Mr. Döbereiner found himself thereby caused to doubt the independent existence of strontium; however, this withstood both his analytical and synthetic experiments. Even more noteworthy is the circumstance that the specific weight of strontium sulfide is likewise the arithmetic mean of that of pure (water-free) calcium sulfide and that [i.e., the sulfide] of barium, namely (2.9 + 4.40) / 2 = 3.65; which must cause [one] to believe even more that celestine might be a mixture of equal stoichiometric amounts of anhydrite [i.e., anhydrous calcium sulfate] and barite.)

— Ferdinand Wurzer

By 1829, Döbereiner had found other groups of three elements (hence "triads") whose physical properties were similarly related. He also noted that some quantifiable properties of elements (e.g. atomic weight and density) in a triad followed a trend whereby the value of the middle element in the triad would be exactly or nearly predicted by taking the arithmetic mean of values for that property of the other two elements. These are as follows:

Predicted vs. actual atomic mass of the central atom of each triad
Triad name	Elements and atomic masses		
Triad name	Element 1 mass	Element 2 Mean of 1 and 3 Actual mass	Element 3 mass
Alkali-forming elements	Lithium; 6.941 u	Sodium; 22.989769 u 23.01965 u	Potassium; 39.0983 u
Alkaline-earth-forming elements	Calcium; 40.078 u	Strontium; 87.62 u 88.7025 u	Barium; 137.327 u
Salt-forming elements	Chlorine; 35.470 u	Bromine; 79.904 u 81.187 u	Iodine; 126.904 u
Acid-forming elements	Sulfur; 32.065 u	Selenium; 78.971 u 79.8325 u	Tellurium; 127.60 u

Limitations:

Not all the known elements could be arranged in the form of triads or three. For very low-mass or very high mass elements, the Döbereiner's triads are not applicable. Take the example of F (Fluorine), Cl (Chlorine), and Br (Bromine). The atomic mass of Cl is not an arithmetic mean of the atomic masses of F and Br. As the techniques for accurately measuring atomic masses improved, the Döbereiner's triad was found to fail to remain strictly valid.
