= Harold Newcomb Hillebrand =

American literary professor

- Born: 1887
- Died: 1953 (aged 65–66)
- Occupation: Professor of English Literature
- Known for: Treatise on Edmund Kean

Harold Newcomb Hillebrand (1887–1953) was a professor of English literature.

Harold was the son of William Francis Hillebrand, a chemist with specialization in geochemistry and Martha May Hillebrand, née Westcott. His brother was an electrical engineer at Palo Alto, California. His grandfather was the botanist William Hillebrand, who went into practise with Wesley Newcomb and married his stepdaughter Anne Post.

After Harold's studies he became a member of the English department (1914–1944) at the University of Illinois. He was head of that department from 1934-1944. His manuscripts are deposed in the archives of the university of Illinois. His research interest was theatre and play writing. His treatise on the Edmund Kean 1787-1833) counts to the best biography about the actor and provides the first scholarly examination of the evidence on Kean's parentage, birth, and upbringing. He published several articles within The Journal of English and Germanic philology.

== Publications ==
- Writing the one-act play; a manual for beginners, by Harold Newcomb Hillebrand. New York, A. A. Knopf, 1925 digitalized in Ditital Library Hathitrust, Retrieved 2011-08-27.
- The child actors; a chapter in Elizabethan stage, 1926
- Edmund Kean, 1933 (reissed: New York: AMS Press, 1966)
- edt. Antony and Cleopatra, by Shakespeare, William, 1564-1616., Boston, D.C. Heath and Co., 1926
