= Lothar Meyer =

German physician and chemist (1830–1895)

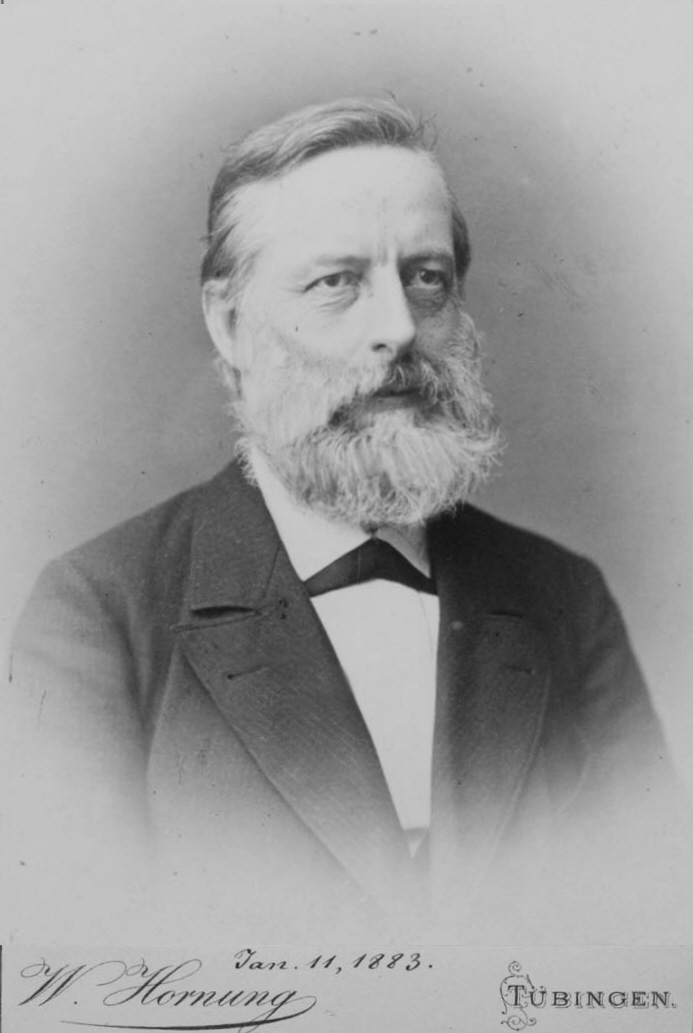
- Meyer in 1883
- Born: Julius Lothar Meyer; 19 August 1830; Varel, Duchy of Oldenburg
- Died: 11 April 1895 (aged 64); Tübingen, Kingdom of Württemberg
- Education: University of Würzburg, University of Breslau
- Known for: Periodic table of chemical elements
- Awards: Davy Medal (1882)
- Scientific career
- Fields: Chemistry
- Workplaces: University of Tübingen

Julius Lothar Meyer (19 August 1830 – 11 April 1895) was a German chemist. He was one of the pioneers in developing the earliest versions of the periodic table of the chemical elements. The Russian chemist Dmitri Mendeleev (his chief rival) and he both had worked with Robert Bunsen. Meyer never used his first given name and was simply known as Lothar Meyer throughout his life.

== Career ==
Meyer was born in Varel, Germany (then part of the Duchy of Oldenburg). He was the son of Friedrich August Meyer, a physician, and Anna Biermann. After attending the Altes Gymnasium in Oldenburg, he studied medicine at the University of Zurich in 1851. Two years later, he studied pathology at the University of Würzburg as a student of Rudolf Virchow. At Zurich, he had studied under Carl Ludwig, which had prompted him to devote his attention to physiological chemistry. After graduating as a Doctor of Medicine from Würzburg in 1854, he went to Heidelberg University, where Robert Bunsen held the chair of chemistry. In 1858, he received a Ph.D. in chemistry from the University of Breslau with a thesis on the effects of carbon monoxide on the blood. With this interest in the physiology of respiration, he had recognized that oxygen combines with the hemoglobin in blood.

Influenced by the mathematical teaching of Gustav Kirchhoff, he took up the study of mathematical physics at the University of Königsberg under Franz Ernst Neumann and in 1859, after having received his habilitation (certification for university teaching), became Privatdozent in physics and chemistry at the University of Breslau. In 1866, Meyer accepted a post at the Eberswalde Forestry Academy at Neustadt-Eberswalde but two years later was appointed to a professorship at the Karlsruhe Polytechnic.

In 1872, Meyer was the first to suggest that the six carbon atoms in the benzene ring (that had been proposed a few years earlier by August Kekulé) were interconnected by single bonds only, the fourth valence of each carbon atom being directed toward the interior of the ring.

During the Franco-Prussian War, the Polytechnic was used as a hospital and Meyer took an active role in the care of the wounded. In 1876, Meyer became Professor of Chemistry at the University of Tübingen. Whilst there he was elected to honorary membership of the Manchester Literary and Philosophical Society in 1889 He served the university until his death from a stroke on 11 April 1895 at the age of 64.

== Periodic table ==
Meyer is best known for his part in the periodic classification of the elements. He noted, as John A. R. Newlands did in England, that if the elements were arranged in the order of their atomic weights, they fell into groups of similar chemical and physical properties repeated at periodic intervals. According to him, if the atomic weights were plotted as ordinates and the atomic volumes as abscissae—the curve obtained a series of maxima and minima—the most electro-positive elements appearing at the peaks of the curve in the order of their atomic weights.

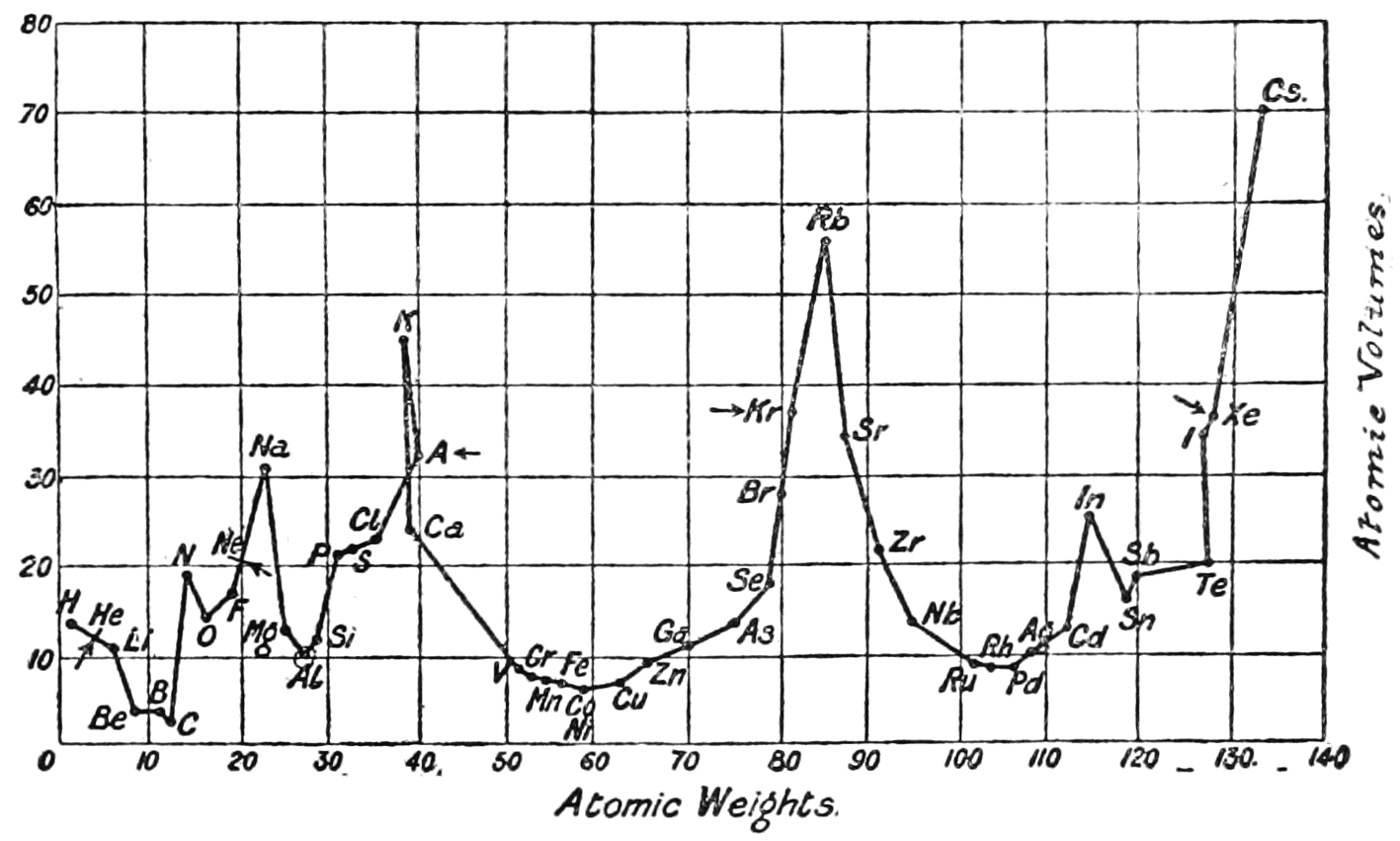
A similar graph from a 1901 issue of PopSci magazine. (The noble gasses marked with arrows were not discovered at the time of Meyer.)

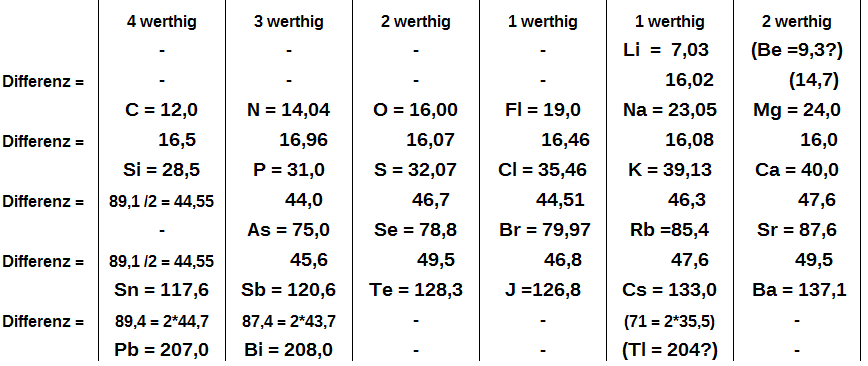
Lothar Meyer's periodic table, published in "Die modernen Theorien der Chemie" (1864)

His book, Die modernen Theorien der Chemie, which he began writing in Breslau in 1862 and published two years later, contained an early version of the periodic table. It contained 28 elements, grouping them for the first time into six families by their valence. Works on organizing the elements by atomic weight, until then had been stymied by the widespread use of equivalent weights for the elements, rather than atomic weights.

He published articles about classification table of the elements in horizontal form (1864) and vertical form (1870), in which the series of periods are properly ended by an element of the alkaline earth metal group.

== Table of Meyer, 1864 ==
	Valence IV	Valence III	Valence II	Valence I	Valence I	Valence II	Mass difference
I row					Li	Be	~16
II row	C	N	O	F	Na	Mg	~16
III row	Si	P	S	Cl	K	Ca	~45
IV row		As	Se	Br	Rb	Sr	~45
V row	Sn	Sb	Te	I	Cs	Ba	~90
VI row	Pb	Bi			Tl		~90

== Table of Meyer, 1870 ==
In 1869, Dmitri Mendeleev published a periodic table of all elements known at that time (he later predicted several new elements to complete the table, and corrected some atomic weights). A few months later, Meyer published a paper that included a revised version of his 1864 table that now included virtually all of the known elements, which was similar to the table published by Mendeleev:

I	II	III	IV	V	VI	VII	VIII	IX
	B	Al				?In$^\dagger$		Tl
	C	Si	Ti		Zr	Sn		Pb
	N	P	V	As	Nb	Sb	Ta	Bi
	O	S	Cr	Se	Mo	Те	W
	F	Cl	Mn; Fe; Co; Ni	Br	Ru; Rh; Pd	I	Os; Ir; Pt
Li	Na	K	Cu	Rb	Ag	Cs	Au
?Be$^\dagger$	Mg	Ca	Zn	Sr	Cd	Ba	Hg
$^\dagger$ The question marks indicate that the atomic weights were conjectured based on the equivalent weights.

Meyer had developed his fuller periodic table independently, but he acknowledged Mendeleev's priority. Included in Meyer's paper was a line chart of atomic volumes as a function of atomic weights, showing graphically the periodicity of the elements. Like Mendeleev, he also included predictions of future elements, but unlike Mendeleev did not emphasize these predictions nor suggest details of the physical and chemical properties of the future elements.

In 1882, both Meyer and Mendeleev received the Davy Medal from the Royal Society in recognition of their work on the Periodic Law.

The mineral lotharmeyerite, CaZn_{2}(AsO_{4})_{2} · 2H_{2}O, was discovered in 1983 and named in recognition of Meyer's work on the Periodic Law. The type locality is the Ojuela mine, Mapimí, Durango, Mexico. Four closely related minerals have been described since 1983: ferrilotharmeyerite (1992); cobaltlotharmeyerite (1997); nickellotharmeyerite (1999); and manganlotharmeyerite (2002).

== Personal life ==
Meyer married Johanna Volkmann in 1866.

== Tribute ==
On 19 August 2020, Google celebrated his 190th birthday with a Google Doodle.

== See also ==
- Dimitri Mendeleev
- History of the periodic table
