= Paul Hillebrand =

Paul Hillebrand is a musician, artist and spiritual leader. Originally from Evanston, Illinois, he relocated to attend Arizona State University with spiritual leaders including musical artist Tom Booth and Bible scholar Kevin Saunders. Hillebrand graduated ASU with honors and a degree in choral education and later complemented his music with additional theological studies by completing a certificate advanced liturgical studies at Corpus Christi Center in Phoenix.

== Liturgical leader ==
Hillebrand has been writing and performing music and has been involved in Liturgical Music Ministry for since the early 1980s. He began at St. Jerome's in Glendale, AZ and moved to St. Maria Goretti Catholic Church, in Scottsdale, Arizona, where he was the Director of Music and Liturgy for 15 years. Since 2001 Hillebrand has been the Director of Music at St. Patrick Catholic Church in Scottsdale, Arizona, .

== Family ==
Hillebrandlives in Tempe, Arizona. His youngest daughter Julia died of a brain tumor in December 2010, shortly before her 13th birthday.

== Teacher ==
Hillebrand leads prayer concerts, workshops and retreats throughout the year. He has sung on many recordings for various Liturgical artists. Hillebrand is a pianist and guitarist.

St. Patricks, where Paul is Director of Music , is a parish of over 4,000 families. It has been indicated as one of the fastest growing parishes in Arizona.

== Music collections ==
Hillebrand's latest release is a compilation album entitled "Towards Jesus, Songs of Comfort and Hope" - Inspired by Julia Hillebrand". This album contains works from Hillebrand, Matt Maher, Tom Booth, Aaron Thompson, Michael John Poirier, Audrey Assad and Julia Hillebrand. Money raised from this album will be donated to Pediatric Brain Tumor Research.

There are three collections of Hillebrand's original Liturgical music–“Promise”, “How Shall We Know You? and “Journey to You”–and 4 other collections of various composers': ”I Will Lift Up My Voice”- Sung sacred Classics, “Seasons of Prayer”, “Come to Us, O Lord” a Christmas album and “Songs of the Good Shepherd” a children’s collection. Paul is also published at Oregon Catholic Press, Spirit and Song, and World Library Publications. A recent critique of Hillebrand's recent album was published in the Catholic Sun.
