= William Francis Hillebrand =

American chemist (1853–1925)

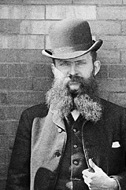
- At the Arts and Industries Building, 1886
- Born: December 12, 1853; Honolulu, Kingdom of Hawaii
- Died: February 7, 1925 (aged 71); United States
- Education: University of Heidelberg
- Scientific career
- Fields: geochemistry
- Workplaces: United States Geological Survey; National Bureau of Standards

William Francis Hillebrand (December 12, 1853 – February 7, 1925) was an American chemist.

== Biography ==
He was the son of the renowned botanist William Hillebrand. He studied at Cornell University and then in Germany at the University of Heidelberg where he received his Ph.D. in 1875. He then worked with Robert Bunsen for two semesters. His research on metallic cerium, which he together with Thomas Norton obtained first in 1872, started his academic career.

He studied organic chemistry for three semesters with Wilhelm Rudolph Fittig at the University of Strasbourg, but changed to geochemistry and metallurgy by studying at the Freiberg Mining Academy. After returning home to the United States in 1878, he opened an assay office in Leadville, Colorado, in 1879, and then started working as a chemist at the United States Geological Survey in 1880. That year he was sent to Denver to establish a chemical laboratory for the Rocky Mountain Division of the Survey. For five years he remained in charge of this laboratory, and then was transferred to the chief laboratory in Washington. He changed to the National Bureau of Standards in 1909 where he was chief chemist.

He was professor of general chemistry and physics at the National College of Pharmacy, from 1892 to 1910; president of the American Chemical Society in 1906; and in 1908 he became editor of the Journal of Industrial and Engineering Chemistry. He was the author of several books on chemical subjects.

His son was the professor of English literature Harold Newcomb Hillebrand (1887–1953).

=== Studies of uranium ===
During an analysis of the uranium containing mineral uranite he discovered that a gas evolved. He identified this gas by spectroscopic methods to be nitrogen. Several years later in 1895 William Ramsay did similar experiments with uranium containing minerals and discovered by similar methods that the gas was a mixture of argon and helium which until then had only been detected in the corona of stars.

A reexamination by Ramsay of Hillebrand's samples showed that the gas from uranite contained a large amount of nitrogen.

== Works ==
- Analyse der Silikat- und Karbonatgesteine . Engelmann, Leipzig 2nd German edition by Ernst Wilke-Dörfurt 1910 Digital edition by the University and State Library Düsseldorf

== Awards and honors ==
Hillebrand was elected to the American Philosophical Society in 1906 and the United States National Academy of Sciences in 1908. The Chemical Society of Washington, a division of the American Chemical Society, awards the Hillebrand Prize Award each year for "original contributions to the science of chemistry". The award was first given in 1925.
