= Johann Wolfgang Döbereiner =

German chemist (1780–1849)

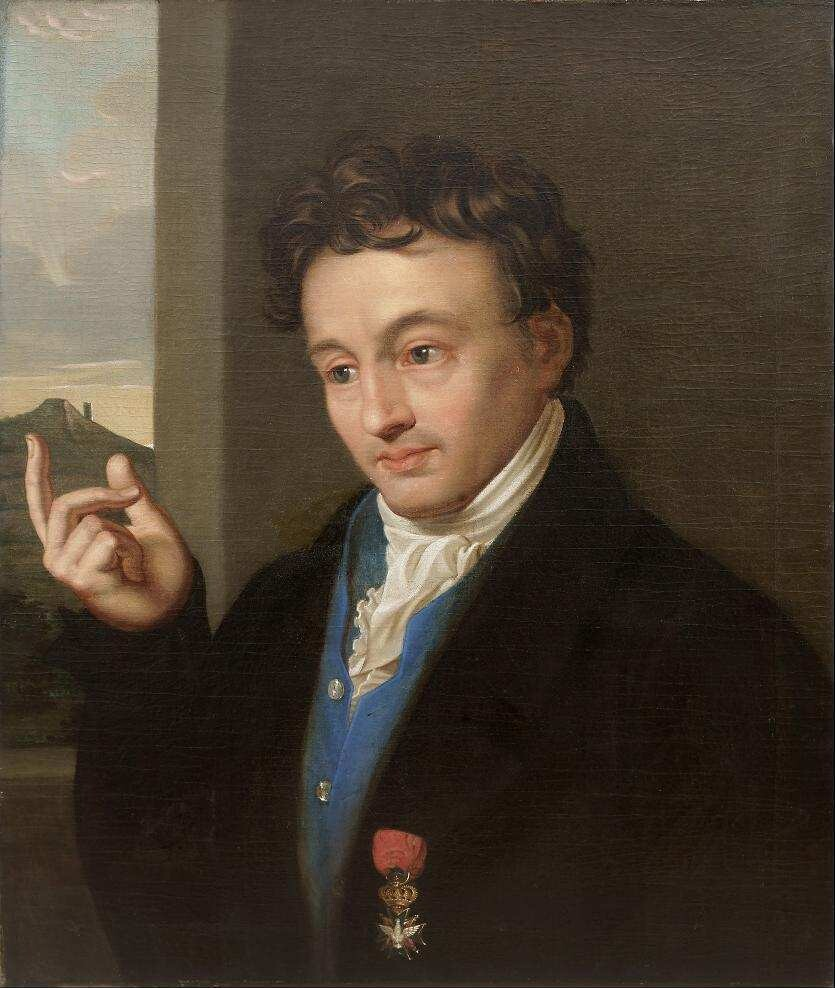
- Döbereiner in 1825
- Born: 13 December 1780; Hof, Principality of Bayreuth
- Died: 24 March 1849 (aged 68); Jena, Grand Duchy of Saxe-Weimar-Eisenach
- Known for: Döbereiner's triads Döbereiner's lamp
- Scientific career
- Fields: Chemistry
- Workplaces: University of Jena

Johann Wolfgang Döbereiner (13 December 1780 – 24 March 1849) was a German chemist who is known best for work that was suggestive of the periodic law for the chemical elements, and for inventing the first lighter, which was known as the Döbereiner's lamp. He became a professor of chemistry and pharmacy for the University of Jena.

== Life and work ==
As a coachman's son, Döbereiner had little opportunity for formal schooling. Thus, he was apprenticed to an apothecary, and began to read widely and to attend science lectures. He eventually became a professor for the University of Jena in 1810 and also studied chemistry at Strasbourg. In work published during 1829, Döbereiner reported trends in certain properties of selected groups of elements. For example, the average of the atomic masses of lithium and potassium was close to the atomic mass of sodium. A similar pattern was found with calcium, strontium, and barium; with sulfur, selenium, tellurium; and with chlorine, bromine, and iodine. Moreover, the densities for some of these triads had a similar pattern. These sets of elements became known as "Döbereiner's triads".

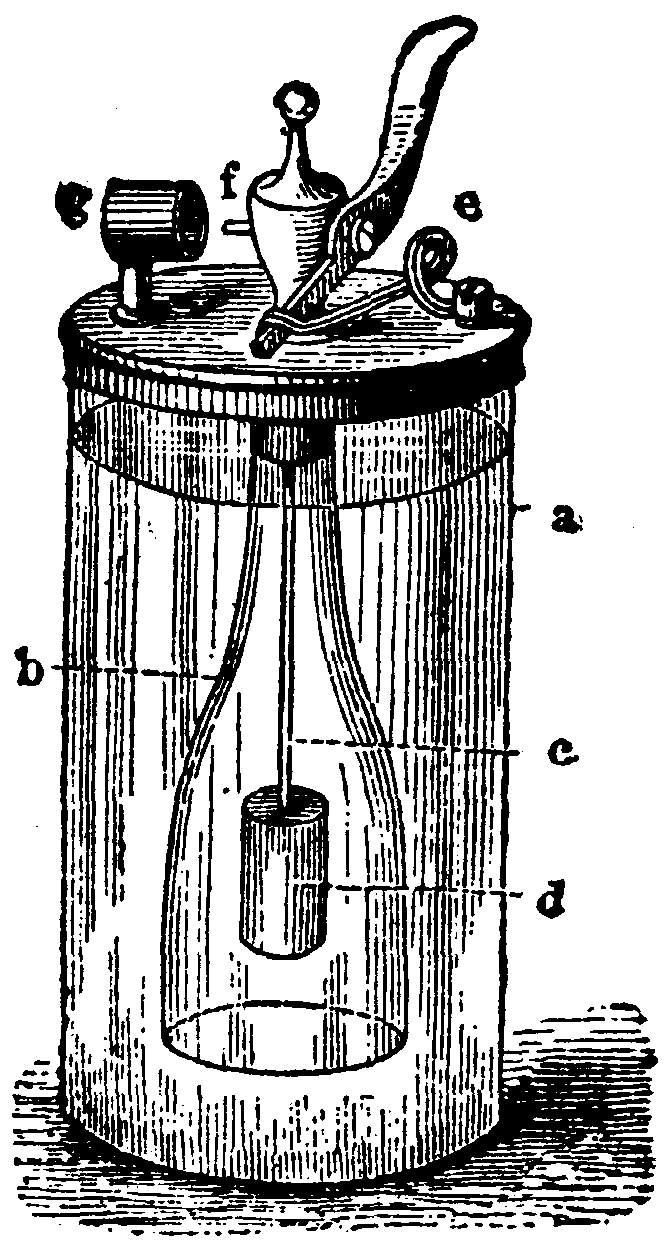
Döbereiner's lamp

Döbereiner is also known for his discovery of furfural, for his work concerning the use of platinum as a catalyst, and for the invention of a lighter, known as Döbereiner's lamp. By 1828 hundreds of thousands of these lighters had been mass produced by the German manufacturer Gottfried Piegler in Schleiz.

The German writer Goethe was a friend of Döbereiner, attended his lectures weekly, and used his theories of chemical affinities as a basis for his famous 1809 novella Elective Affinities.

== Works ==
- Deutsches Apothekerbuch . Vol. 1-3 . Balz, Stuttgart 1842-1848 Digital edition by the University and State Library Düsseldorf
