= Periodic table =

Tabular arrangement of the chemical elements

Periodic table of the chemical elements showing the most or more commonly named sets of elements (in periodic tables), and a traditional dividing line between metals and nonmetals. The f-block actually fits between groups 2 and 3; it is usually shown at the foot of the table to save horizontal space.

The periodic table, also known as the periodic table of the elements, is an ordered arrangement of the chemical elements into rows ("periods") and columns ("groups"). Elements in the same group tend to show similar chemical characteristics. The table is also divided into four roughly rectangular areas called blocks. The periodic table is an icon of chemistry, although it is also widely used in physics and other sciences. It is a depiction of the periodic law, which states that when the elements are arranged in order of their atomic numbers an approximate recurrence of their properties is evident.

Vertical, horizontal and diagonal trends characterize the periodic table. Metallic character increases going down a group and from right to left across a period. Nonmetallic character increases going from the bottom left of the periodic table to the top right.

The first periodic table to become generally accepted was that of the Russian chemist Dmitri Mendeleev in 1869; he formulated the periodic law as a dependence of chemical properties on atomic mass. As not all elements were then known, there were gaps in his periodic table, and Mendeleev successfully used the periodic law to predict some properties of some of the missing elements. The periodic law was recognized as a fundamental discovery in the late 19th century. It was explained early in the 20th century, with the discovery of atomic numbers and associated pioneering work in quantum mechanics, both ideas serving to illuminate the internal structure of the atom. A recognisably modern form of the table was reached in 1945 with Glenn T. Seaborg's discovery that the actinides were in fact f-block rather than d-block elements. The periodic table and law have become a central and indispensable part of modern chemistry.

The periodic table continues to evolve with the progress of science. In nature, only elements up to atomic number 94 exist; (Note: The question of how many natural elements there are is quite complicated and is not fully resolved. The heaviest element that occurs in large quantities on Earth is element 92, uranium. However, uranium can undergo spontaneous fission in nature, and the resulting neutrons can strike other uranium atoms. If neutron capture then occurs, elements 93 and 94, neptunium and plutonium, are formed via beta decay; these are in fact more common than some of the rarest elements in the first 92, such as promethium, astatine, and francium (see Abundance of elements in Earth's crust). Theoretically, neutron capture on the resulting plutonium might produce even higher-numbered elements, but the quantities would be too small to be observed. In the early Solar System, shorter-lived elements had not yet decayed away, and consequently there were more than 94 naturally occurring elements. Curium (element 96) is the longest-lived element beyond the first 94, and is probably still being brought to Earth via cosmic rays, but it has not been found. Elements up to 99 (einsteinium) have been observed in Przybylski's Star. Elements up to 100 (fermium) probably occurred in the natural nuclear fission reactor at Oklo Mine, Gabon, but they have long since decayed away. Even heavier elements may be produced in the r-process via supernovae or neutron star mergers, but this has not been confirmed. It is not clear how far they would extend past 100 and how long they would last: calculations suggest that nuclides of mass number around 280 to 290 are formed in the r-process, but quickly beta decay to nuclides that suffer spontaneous fission, so that 99.9% of the produced superheavy nuclides would decay within a month. If instead they were sufficiently long-lived, they might similarly be brought to Earth via cosmic rays, but again none have been found.) elements beyond that are synthetic elements that can only be obtained artificially. By 2010, the first 118 elements were known, thereby completing the first seven rows of the table; however, chemical characterization is still needed for the heaviest elements to confirm that their properties match their positions. New discoveries will extend the table beyond these seven rows, though it is not yet known how many more elements are possible; moreover, theoretical calculations suggest that this unknown region will not follow the patterns of the known part of the table. Some scientific discussion also continues regarding whether some elements are correctly positioned in the table. Many alternative representations of the periodic law exist, and there is some discussion as to whether there is an optimal form of the periodic table.

== Structure ==
Periodic table

Group	1	2		3	4	5	6	7	8	9	10	11	12	13	14	15	16	17	18
	Hydrogen & alkali metals	Alkaline earth metals												Triels	Tetrels	Pnictogens	Chalcogens	Halogens	Noble gases
Period 1	Hydrogen1H1.0080																		Helium2He4.0026
2	Lithium3Li6.94	Beryllium4Be9.0122												Boron5B10.81	Carbon6C12.011	Nitrogen7N14.007	Oxygen8O15.999	Fluorine9F18.998	Neon10Ne20.180
3	Sodium11Na22.990	Magnesium12Mg24.305												Aluminium13Al26.982	Silicon14Si28.085	Phosphorus15P30.974	Sulfur16S32.06	Chlorine17Cl35.45	Argon18Ar39.95
4	Potassium19K39.098	Calcium20Ca40.078		Scandium21Sc44.956	Titanium22Ti47.867	Vanadium23V50.942	Chromium24Cr51.996	Manganese25Mn54.938	Iron26Fe55.845	Cobalt27Co58.933	Nickel28Ni58.693	Copper29Cu63.546	Zinc30Zn65.38	Gallium31Ga69.723	Germanium32Ge72.630	Arsenic33As74.922	Selenium34Se78.971	Bromine35Br79.904	Krypton36Kr83.798
5	Rubidium37Rb85.468	Strontium38Sr87.62		Yttrium39Y88.906	Zirconium40Zr91.224	Niobium41Nb92.906	Molybdenum42Mo95.95	Technetium43Tc[97]	Ruthenium44Ru101.07	Rhodium45Rh102.91	Palladium46Pd106.42	Silver47Ag107.87	Cadmium48Cd112.41	Indium49In114.82	Tin50Sn118.71	Antimony51Sb121.76	Tellurium52Te127.60	Iodine53I126.90	Xenon54Xe131.29
6	Caesium55Cs132.91	Barium56Ba137.33	1 asterisk	Lutetium71Lu174.97	Hafnium72Hf178.49	Tantalum73Ta180.95	Tungsten74W183.84	Rhenium75Re186.21	Osmium76Os190.23	Iridium77Ir192.22	Platinum78Pt195.08	Gold79Au196.97	Mercury80Hg200.59	Thallium81Tl204.38	Lead82Pb207.2	Bismuth83Bi208.98	Polonium84Po[209]	Astatine85At[210]	Radon86Rn[222]
7	Francium87Fr[223]	Radium88Ra[226]	1 asterisk	Lawrencium103Lr[266]	Rutherfordium104Rf[267]	Dubnium105Db[268]	Seaborgium106Sg[269]	Bohrium107Bh[270]	Hassium108Hs[271]	Meitnerium109Mt[278]	Darmstadtium110Ds[281]	Roentgenium111Rg[282]	Copernicium112Cn[285]	Nihonium113Nh[286]	Flerovium114Fl[289]	Moscovium115Mc[290]	Livermorium116Lv[293]	Tennessine117Ts[294]	Oganesson118Og[294]
			1 asterisk	Lanthanum57La138.91	Cerium58Ce140.12	Praseodymium59Pr140.91	Neodymium60Nd144.24	Promethium61Pm[145]	Samarium62Sm150.36	Europium63Eu151.96	Gadolinium64Gd157.25	Terbium65Tb158.93	Dysprosium66Dy162.50	Holmium67Ho164.93	Erbium68Er167.26	Thulium69Tm168.93	Ytterbium70Yb173.05
			1 asterisk	Actinium89Ac[227]	Thorium90Th232.04	Protactinium91Pa231.04	Uranium92U238.03	Neptunium93Np[237]	Plutonium94Pu[244]	Americium95Am[243]	Curium96Cm[247]	Berkelium97Bk[247]	Californium98Cf[251]	Einsteinium99Es[252]	Fermium100Fm[257]	Mendelevium101Md[258]	Nobelium102No[259]

Primordial From decay Synthetic Border shows natural occurrence of the element

Standard atomic weight A_{r, std}(E)
- Ca: 40.078 — Abridged value (uncertainty omitted here)
- Po: [209] — mass number of the most stable isotope

s-block	f-block	d-block	p-block

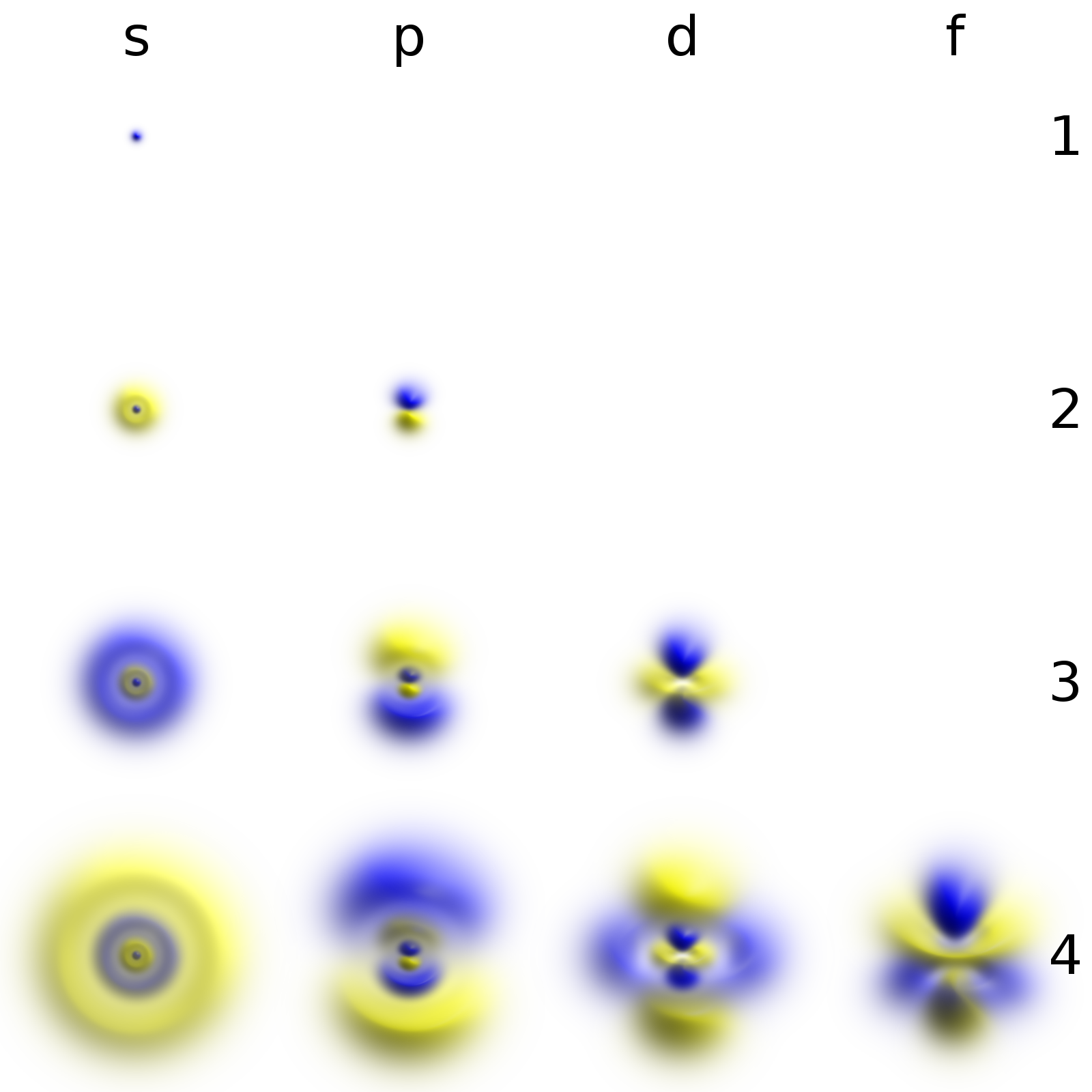
3D views of some hydrogen-like atomic orbitals showing probability density and phase (g orbitals and higher are not shown)

Each chemical element has a unique atomic number (Z— for "Zahl", German for "number") representing the number of protons in its nucleus. Each distinct atomic number therefore corresponds to a class of atom: these classes are called the chemical elements. The chemical elements are what the periodic table classifies and organizes. Hydrogen is the element with atomic number 1; helium, atomic number 2; lithium, atomic number 3; and so on. Each of these names can be further abbreviated by a one- or two-letter chemical symbol; those for hydrogen, helium, and lithium are respectively H, He, and Li. Neutrons do not affect the atom's chemical identity, but do affect its weight. Atoms with the same number of protons but different numbers of neutrons are called isotopes of the same chemical element. Naturally occurring elements usually occur as mixes of different isotopes; since each isotope usually occurs with a characteristic abundance, naturally occurring elements have well-defined atomic weights, defined as the average mass of a naturally occurring atom of that element. All elements have multiple isotopes, variants with the same number of protons but different numbers of neutrons. For example, carbon has three naturally occurring isotopes: all of its atoms have six protons and most have six neutrons as well, but about one per cent have seven neutrons, and a very small fraction have eight neutrons. Isotopes are never separated in the periodic table; they are always grouped together under a single element. When atomic mass is shown, it is usually the weighted average of naturally occurring isotopes; but if no isotopes occur naturally in significant quantities, the mass of the most stable isotope usually appears, often in parentheses.

In the standard periodic table, the elements are listed in order of increasing atomic number. A new row (period) is started when a new electron shell has its first electron. Columns (groups) are determined by the electron configuration of the atom; elements with the same number of electrons in a particular subshell fall into the same columns (e.g. oxygen, sulfur, and selenium are in the same column because they all have four electrons in the outermost p-subshell). Elements with similar chemical properties generally fall into the same group in the periodic table, although in the f-block, and to some respect in the d-block, the elements in the same period tend to have similar properties, as well. Thus, it is relatively easy to predict the chemical properties of an element if one knows the properties of the elements around it.

Today, 118 elements are known, the first 94 of which are known to occur naturally on Earth. The remaining 24, americium to oganesson (95–118), occur only when synthesized in laboratories. Of the 94 naturally occurring elements, 83 are primordial and 11 occur only in decay chains of primordial elements. A few of the latter are so rare that they were not discovered in nature, but were synthesized in the laboratory before it was determined that they exist in nature: technetium (element 43), promethium (element 61), astatine (element 85), neptunium (element 93), and plutonium (element 94). No element heavier than einsteinium (element 99) has ever been observed in macroscopic quantities in its pure form, nor has astatine; francium (element 87) has been only photographed in the form of light emitted from microscopic quantities. Of the 94 natural elements, eighty have a stable isotope and one more (bismuth) has an almost-stable isotope (with a half-life of 2.01×10^{19} years, over a billion times the age of the universe). (Note: Some isotopes currently considered stable are theoretically expected to be radioactive with extremely long half-lives: for instance, all the stable isotopes of elements 62 (samarium), 63 (europium), and all elements from 67 (holmium) onward are expected to undergo alpha decay or double beta decay. However, the predicted half-lives are extremely long (e.g. the alpha decay of ^{208}Pb to the ground state of ^{204}Hg is expected to have a half-life greater than 10^{120} years), and the decays have never been observed.) Two more, thorium and uranium, have isotopes undergoing radioactive decay with a half-life comparable to the age of the Earth. The stable elements plus bismuth, thorium, and uranium make up the 83 primordial elements that survived from the Earth's formation. (Note: The half-life of plutonium's most stable isotope is just long enough that it should also be a primordial element. A 1971 study claimed to have detected primordial plutonium, but a more recent study from 2012 could not detect it. Based on its likely initial abundance in the Solar System, present experiments as of 2022 are likely about an order of magnitude away from detecting live primordial ^{244}Pu.) The remaining eleven natural elements decay quickly enough that their continued trace occurrence rests primarily on being constantly regenerated as intermediate products of the decay of thorium and uranium. (Note: Tiny traces of plutonium are also continually brought to Earth via cosmic rays.) All 24 known artificial elements are radioactive.

=== Group names and numbers ===
Under an international naming convention, the groups are numbered numerically from 1 to 18 from the leftmost column (the alkali metals) to the rightmost column (the noble gases). The f-block groups are ignored in this numbering. Groups can also be named by their first element, e.g. the "scandium group" for group 3. Previously, groups were known by Roman numerals. In the United States, the Roman numerals were followed by either an "A" (if the group was in the s- or p-block) or a "B" (if the group was in the d-block). The Roman numerals used correspond to the last digit of today's naming convention (e.g., the group 4 elements were group IVB, and the group 14 elements were group IVA). In Europe, "A" was used for groups 1 through 7, and "B" was used for groups 11 through 17. In addition, groups 8, 9, and 10 used to be treated as one triple-sized group, known collectively in both notations as group VIII. In 1988, the new IUPAC (International Union of Pure and Applied Chemistry) naming system (1–18) was put into use, and the old group names (I–VIII) were deprecated.

Groups in the periodic table

IUPAC group	1^{a}	2	—^{b}	3^{c}	4	5	6	7	8	9	10	11	12	13	14	15	16	17	18
Mendeleev (I–VIII)	I	II		III	IV	V	VI	VII	VIII			I	II	III	IV	V	VI	VII	^{d}
CAS (US, A-B-A)	IA	IIA		IIIB	IVB	VB	VIB	VIIB	VIIIB			IB	IIB	IIIA	IVA	VA	VIA	VIIA	VIIIA
Old IUPAC (Europe, A–B)	IA	IIA		IIIA	IVA	VA	VIA	VIIA	VIII			IB	IIB	IIIB	IVB	VB	VIB	VIIB	0
Trivial name^{r}	H and alkali metals	alkaline earth metals	lanthanoids actinoids											triels	tetrels	pnictogens	chalcogens	halogens	noble gases
Name by element^{r}	lithium group	beryllium group		scandium group	titanium group	vanadium group	chromium group	manganese group	iron group	cobalt group	nickel group	copper group	zinc group	boron group	carbon group	nitrogen group	oxygen group	fluorine group	helium or neon group
Period 1	H																		He
Period 2	Li	Be												B	C	N	O	F	Ne
Period 3	Na	Mg												Al	Si	P	S	Cl	Ar
Period 4	K	Ca		Sc	Ti	V	Cr	Mn	Fe	Co	Ni	Cu	Zn	Ga	Ge	As	Se	Br	Kr
Period 5	Rb	Sr		Y	Zr	Nb	Mo	Tc	Ru	Rh	Pd	Ag	Cd	In	Sn	Sb	Te	I	Xe
Period 6	Cs	Ba	La–Yb	Lu	Hf	Ta	W	Re	Os	Ir	Pt	Au	Hg	Tl	Pb	Bi	Po	At	Rn
Period 7	Fr	Ra	Ac–No	Lr	Rf	Db	Sg	Bh	Hs	Mt	Ds	Rg	Cn	Nh	Fl	Mc	Lv	Ts	Og

^{a} Group 1 is composed of hydrogen (H) and the alkali metals. Elements of the group have one s-electron in the outer electron shell. Hydrogen is not considered to be an alkali metal as it is not a metal, though it is more analogous to them than any other group. This makes the group somewhat exceptional.
^{b} The 14 f-block groups (columns) do not have a group number.
^{c} The correct composition of group 3 is scandium (Sc), yttrium (Y), lutetium (Lu), and lawrencium (Lr), as shown here: this is endorsed by 1988 and 2021 IUPAC reports on the question. General inorganic chemistry texts often put scandium (Sc), yttrium (Y), lanthanum (La), and actinium (Ac) in group 3, so that Ce–Lu and Th–Lr become the f-block between groups 3 and 4; this was based on incorrectly measured electron configurations from history, and Lev Landau and Evgeny Lifshitz already considered it incorrect in 1948. Arguments can still occasionally be encountered in the contemporary literature purporting to defend it, but most authors consider them logically inconsistent. Some sources follow a compromise that puts La–Lu and Ac–Lr as the f-block rows (despite that giving 15 f-block elements in each row, which contradicts quantum mechanics), leaving the heavier members of group 3 ambiguous. See also Group 3 element#Composition.
^{d} Group 18, the noble gases, had not been discovered at the time of Mendeleev's original table. Later (1902), Mendeleev accepted the evidence for their existence, and they could be placed in a new "group 0", consistently and without breaking the periodic table principle.
^{r} Group name as recommended by IUPAC.

=== Presentation forms ===
Hydrogen																															Helium
Lithium	Beryllium																									Boron	Carbon	Nitrogen	Oxygen	Fluorine	Neon
Sodium	Magnesium																									Aluminium	Silicon	Phosphorus	Sulfur	Chlorine	Argon
Potassium	Calcium															Scandium	Titanium	Vanadium	Chromium	Manganese	Iron	Cobalt	Nickel	Copper	Zinc	Gallium	Germanium	Arsenic	Selenium	Bromine	Krypton
Rubidium	Strontium															Yttrium	Zirconium	Niobium	Molybdenum	Technetium	Ruthenium	Rhodium	Palladium	Silver	Cadmium	Indium	Tin	Antimony	Tellurium	Iodine	Xenon
Caesium	Barium	Lanthanum	Cerium	Praseodymium	Neodymium	Promethium	Samarium	Europium	Gadolinium	Terbium	Dysprosium	Holmium	Erbium	Thulium	Ytterbium	Lutetium	Hafnium	Tantalum	Tungsten	Rhenium	Osmium	Iridium	Platinum	Gold	Mercury (element)	Thallium	Lead	Bismuth	Polonium	Astatine	Radon
Francium	Radium	Actinium	Thorium	Protactinium	Uranium	Neptunium	Plutonium	Americium	Curium	Berkelium	Californium	Einsteinium	Fermium	Mendelevium	Nobelium	Lawrencium	Rutherfordium	Dubnium	Seaborgium	Bohrium	Hassium	Meitnerium	Darmstadtium	Roentgenium	Copernicium	Nihonium	Flerovium	Moscovium	Livermorium	Tennessine	Oganesson

32 columns

Hydrogen																	Helium
Lithium	Beryllium											Boron	Carbon	Nitrogen	Oxygen	Fluorine	Neon
Sodium	Magnesium											Aluminium	Silicon	Phosphorus	Sulfur	Chlorine	Argon
Potassium	Calcium	Scandium	Titanium	Vanadium	Chromium	Manganese	Iron	Cobalt	Nickel	Copper	Zinc	Gallium	Germanium	Arsenic	Selenium	Bromine	Krypton
Rubidium	Strontium	Yttrium	Zirconium	Niobium	Molybdenum	Technetium	Ruthenium	Rhodium	Palladium	Silver	Cadmium	Indium	Tin	Antimony	Tellurium	Iodine	Xenon
Caesium	Barium	Lutetium	Hafnium	Tantalum	Tungsten	Rhenium	Osmium	Iridium	Platinum	Gold	Mercury (element)	Thallium	Lead	Bismuth	Polonium	Astatine	Radon
Francium	Radium	Lawrencium	Rutherfordium	Dubnium	Seaborgium	Bohrium	Hassium	Meitnerium	Darmstadtium	Roentgenium	Copernicium	Nihonium	Flerovium	Moscovium	Livermorium	Tennessine	Oganesson
		Lanthanum	Cerium	Praseodymium	Neodymium	Promethium	Samarium	Europium	Gadolinium	Terbium	Dysprosium	Holmium	Erbium	Thulium	Ytterbium
		Actinium	Thorium	Protactinium	Uranium	Neptunium	Plutonium	Americium	Curium	Berkelium	Californium	Einsteinium	Fermium	Mendelevium	Nobelium

18 columns

For reasons of space, the periodic table is commonly presented with the f-block elements cut out and positioned as a distinct part below the main body. This reduces the number of element columns from 32 to 18.

Both forms represent the same periodic table. The form with the f-block included in the main body is sometimes called the 32-column or long form; the form with the f-block cut out the 18-column or medium-long form. The 32-column form has the advantage of showing all elements in their correct sequence, but it has the disadvantage of requiring more space. The form chosen is an editorial choice, and does not imply any change of scientific claim or statement. For example, when discussing the composition of group 3, the options can be shown equally (unprejudiced) in both forms.

Periodic tables usually at least show the elements' symbols; many also provide supplementary information about the elements, either via colour-coding or as data in the cells. Tables may include extra information such as the names and atomic numbers of the elements, their blocks, natural occurrences, standard atomic weight, states of matter, melting and boiling points, densities, as well as provide different classifications of the elements. (Note: See for example the periodic table poster sold by Sigma-Aldrich.)

=== Electron configurations ===
The periodic table is a graphic description of the periodic law, which states that the properties and atomic structures of the chemical elements are a periodic function of their atomic number. Elements are placed in the periodic table according to their electron configurations, the periodic recurrences of which explain the trends in properties across the periodic table.

An electron can be thought of as inhabiting an atomic orbital, which characterizes the probability it can be found in any particular region around the atom. Their energies are quantised, which is to say that they can only take discrete values. Furthermore, electrons obey the Pauli exclusion principle: different electrons must always be in different states. This allows classification of the possible states an electron can take in various energy levels known as shells, divided into individual subshells, which each contain one or more orbitals. Each orbital can contain up to two electrons: they are distinguished by a quantity known as spin, conventionally labelled "up" or "down". (Note: Strictly speaking, one cannot draw an orbital such that the electron is guaranteed to be inside it, but it can be drawn to guarantee a 90% probability of this for example.) In a cold atom (one in its ground state), electrons arrange themselves in such a way that the total energy they have is minimized by occupying the lowest-energy orbitals available. Only the outermost electrons (valence electrons) have enough energy to break free of the nucleus and participate in chemical reactions with other atoms. The others are called core electrons.

ℓ =	0	1	2	3	4	5	6	Shell capacity (2n^{2})
Orbital	s	p	d	f	g	h	i	Shell capacity (2n^{2})
n = 1	1s							2
n = 2	2s	2p						8
n = 3	3s	3p	3d					18
n = 4	4s	4p	4d	4f				32
n = 5	5s	5p	5d	5f	5g			50
n = 6	6s	6p	6d	6f	6g	6h		72
n = 7	7s	7p	7d	7f	7g	7h	7i	98
Subshell capacity (4ℓ+2)	2	6	10	14	18	22	26	

Elements are known with up to the first seven shells occupied. The first shell contains only one orbital, a spherical s orbital. As it is in the first shell, this is called the 1s orbital. This can hold up to two electrons. The second shell similarly contains a 2s orbital, and it also contains three dumbbell-shaped 2p orbitals, and can thus fill up to eight electrons (2×1 + 2×3 = 8). The third shell contains one 3s orbital, three 3p orbitals, and five 3d orbitals, and thus has a capacity of 2×1 + 2×3 + 2×5 = 18. The fourth shell contains one 4s orbital, three 4p orbitals, five 4d orbitals, and seven 4f orbitals, thus leading to a capacity of 2×1 + 2×3 + 2×5 + 2×7 = 32. Higher shells contain more types of orbitals that continue the pattern, but such types of orbitals are not filled in the ground states of known elements. The subshell types are characterized by the quantum numbers. Four numbers describe an orbital in an atom completely: the principal quantum number n, the azimuthal quantum number ℓ (the orbital type), the orbital magnetic quantum number m_{ℓ}, and the spin magnetic quantum number m_{s}.

==== Order of subshell filling ====
Idealized order of subshell filling according to the Madelung rule

The sequence in which the subshells are filled is given in most cases by the Aufbau principle, also known as the Madelung or Klechkovsky rule (after Erwin Madelung and Vsevolod Klechkovsky respectively). This rule was first observed empirically by Madelung, and Klechkovsky and later authors gave it theoretical justification. (Note: Authors differ on whether the n + ℓ rule has yet been derived from quantum mechanics. Scerri claims that it has not, despite several attempts to do so. On the other hand, Ostrovsky, who has claimed such justification from 1971, wrote "Some authors insist that 'still nobody has deduced the n+l rule from the principles of quantum mechanics', while others present quantum justification of the rule that was not ever disputed." Other authors argue that such a derivation is not necessary, because it admits exceptions.) The shells overlap in energies, and the Madelung rule specifies the sequence of filling according to:

1s ≪ 2s < 2p ≪ 3s < 3p ≪ 4s < 3d < 4p ≪ 5s < 4d < 5p ≪ 6s < 4f < 5d < 6p ≪ 7s < 5f < 6d < 7p ≪ ...

Here the sign ≪ means "much less than" as opposed to < meaning just "less than". Phrased differently, electrons enter orbitals in order of increasing n + ℓ, and if two orbitals are available with the same value of n + ℓ, the one with lower n is occupied first. In general, orbitals with the same value of n + ℓ are similar in energy, but in the case of the s orbitals (with ℓ = 0), quantum effects raise their energy to approach that of the next n + ℓ group. Hence the periodic table is usually drawn to begin each row (often called a period) with the filling of a new s orbital, which corresponds to the beginning of a new shell. Thus, with the exception of the first row, each period length appears twice:

2, 8, 8, 18, 18, 32, 32, ...

The overlaps get quite close at the point where the d orbitals enter the picture, and the order can shift slightly with atomic number and atomic charge. (Note: Once two to four electrons are removed, the d and f orbitals usually become lower in energy than the s ones: 1s ≪ 2s < 2p ≪ 3s < 3p ≪ 3d < 4s < 4p ≪ 4d < 5s < 5p ≪ 4f < 5d < 6s < 6p ≪ 5f < 6d < 7s < 7p ≪ ... and in the limit for extremely highly charged ions, orbitals simply fill in the order of increasing n instead. There is a gradual transition between the limiting situations of highly charged ions (increasing n) and neutral atoms (Madelung's rule). Thus for example, the energy order for the 55th electron outside the xenon core proceeds as follows in the isoelectronic series of caesium (55 electrons): Cs^{0}: 6s < 6p < 5d < 7s < 4f Ba^{+}: 6s < 5d < 6p < 7s < 4f La^{2+}: 5d < 4f < 6s < 6p < 7s Ce^{3+}: 4f < 5d < 6s < 6p < 7s and in the isoelectronic series of holmium (67 electrons), a Ho^{0} atom is [Xe]4f^{11}6s^{2}, but Er^{+} is [Xe]4f^{12}6s^{1}, Tm^{2+} through W^{7+} are [Xe]4f^{13}, and from Re^{8+} onward the configuration is [Cd]4f^{14}5p^{5} following the hydrogenic order. Also, the ordering of the orbitals between each ≪ changes somewhat throughout each period. For example, the ordering in argon and potassium is 3p ≪ 4s < 4p ≪ 3d; by calcium it has become 3p ≪ 4s < 3d < 4p; from scandium to copper it is 3p ≪ 3d < 4s < 4p; and from zinc to krypton it is 3p < 3d ≪ 4s < 4p as the d orbitals fall into the core at gallium. Deeply buried core shells in heavy atoms thus come closer to the hydrogenic order: around osmium (Z = 76) 4f falls below 5p, and around bismuth (Z = 83) 4f falls below 5s as well.)

Starting from the simplest atom, this lets us build up the periodic table one at a time in order of atomic number, by considering the cases of single atoms. In hydrogen, there is only one electron, which must go in the lowest-energy orbital 1s. This electron configuration is written 1s^{1}, where the superscript indicates the number of electrons in the subshell. Helium adds a second electron, which also goes into 1s, completely filling the first shell and giving the configuration 1s^{2}. (Note: In fact, electron configurations represent a first-order approximation: an atom really exists in a superposition of multiple configurations, and electrons in an atom are indistinguishable. The elements in the d- and f-blocks have multiple configurations separated by small energies and can change configuration depending on the chemical environment. In some of the undiscovered g-block elements, mixing of configurations may become so important that the result can no longer be well-described by a single configuration.)

Starting from the third element, lithium, the first shell is full, so its third electron occupies a 2s orbital, giving a 1s^{2} 2s^{1} configuration. The 2s electron is lithium's only valence electron, as the 1s subshell is now too tightly bound to the nucleus to participate in chemical bonding to other atoms: such a shell is called a "core shell". The 1s subshell is a core shell for all elements from lithium onward. The 2s subshell is completed by the next element beryllium (1s^{2} 2s^{2}). The following elements then proceed to fill the 2p subshell. Boron (1s^{2} 2s^{2} 2p^{1}) puts its new electron in a 2p orbital; carbon (1s^{2} 2s^{2} 2p^{2}) fills a second 2p orbital; and with nitrogen (1s^{2} 2s^{2} 2p^{3}) all three 2p orbitals become singly occupied. This is consistent with Hund's rule, which states that atoms usually prefer to singly occupy each orbital of the same type before filling them with the second electron. Oxygen (1s^{2} 2s^{2} 2p^{4}), fluorine (1s^{2} 2s^{2} 2p^{5}), and neon (1s^{2} 2s^{2} 2p^{6}) then complete the already singly filled 2p orbitals; the last of these fills the second shell completely.

Starting from element 11, sodium, the second shell is full, making the second shell a core shell for this and all heavier elements. The eleventh electron begins the filling of the third shell by occupying a 3s orbital, giving a configuration of 1s^{2} 2s^{2} 2p^{6} 3s^{1} for sodium. This configuration is abbreviated [Ne] 3s^{1}, where [Ne] represents neon's configuration. Magnesium ([Ne] 3s^{2}) finishes this 3s orbital, and the following six elements aluminium, silicon, phosphorus, sulfur, chlorine, and argon fill the three 3p orbitals ([Ne] 3s^{2} 3p^{1} through [Ne] 3s^{2} 3p^{6}). This creates an analogous series in which the outer shell structures of sodium through argon are analogous to those of lithium through neon, and is the basis for the periodicity of chemical properties that the periodic table illustrates: at regular but changing intervals of atomic numbers, the properties of the chemical elements approximately repeat.

The first 18 elements can thus be arranged as the start of a periodic table. Elements in the same column have the same number of valence electrons and have analogous valence electron configurations: these columns are called groups. The single exception is helium, which has two valence electrons like beryllium and magnesium, but is typically placed in the column of neon and argon to emphasise that its outer shell is full. (Some contemporary authors question even this single exception, preferring to consistently follow the valence configurations and place helium over beryllium.) There are eight columns in this periodic table fragment, corresponding to at most eight outer-shell electrons. A period begins when a new shell starts filling. Finally, the colouring illustrates the blocks: the elements in the s-block (coloured red) are filling s orbitals, while those in the p-block (coloured yellow) are filling p orbitals.

1 H							2 He	2×1 = 2 elements 1s
3 Li	4 Be	5 B	6 C	7 N	8 O	9 F	10; Ne	2×(1+3) = 8 elements 2s 2p
11; Na	12; Mg	13; Al	14; Si	15; P	16; S	17; Cl	18; Ar	2×(1+3) = 8 elements 3s 3p

Starting the next row, for potassium and calcium the 4s subshell is the lowest in energy, and therefore it fills next. Potassium adds one electron to the 4s shell ([Ar] 4s^{1}), and calcium then completes it ([Ar] 4s^{2}). However, starting from scandium ([Ar] 3d^{1} 4s^{2}) the 3d subshell becomes the next highest in energy. The 4s and 3d subshells have approximately the same energy and they compete for filling the electrons, and so the occupation is not quite consistently filling the 3d orbitals one at a time. The precise energy ordering of 3d and 4s changes along the row, and also changes depending on how many electrons are removed from the atom. For example, due to the repulsion between the 3d electrons and the 4s ones, at chromium the 4s energy level becomes slightly higher than 3d, and so it becomes more profitable for a chromium atom to have a [Ar] 3d^{5} 4s^{1} configuration than an [Ar] 3d^{4} 4s^{2} one. A similar anomaly occurs at copper, whose atom has a [Ar] 3d^{10} 4s^{1} configuration rather than the expected [Ar] 3d^{9} 4s^{2}. These are violations of the Madelung rule. Such anomalies, however, do not have any chemical significance: most chemistry is not about isolated gaseous atoms, and the various configurations are so close in energy to each other that the presence of a nearby atom can shift the balance. Therefore, the periodic table ignores them and considers only idealized configurations.

At zinc ([Ar] 3d^{10} 4s^{2}), the 3d orbitals are completely filled with a total of ten electrons. Next come the 4p orbitals, completing the row, which are filled progressively by gallium ([Ar] 3d^{10} 4s^{2} 4p^{1}) through krypton ([Ar] 3d^{10} 4s^{2} 4p^{6}), in a manner analogous to the previous p-block elements. From gallium onwards, the 3d orbitals form part of the electronic core, and no longer participate in chemistry. The s- and p-block elements, which fill their outer shells, are called main-group elements; the d-block elements (coloured blue below), which fill an inner shell, are called transition elements (or transition metals, since they are all metals).

The next 18 elements fill the 5s orbitals (rubidium and strontium), then 4d (yttrium through cadmium, again with a few anomalies along the way), and then 5p (indium through xenon). Again, from indium onward the 4d orbitals are in the core. Hence the fifth row has the same structure as the fourth.

1 H																	2 He	2×1 = 2 elements 1s
3 Li	4 Be											5 B	6 C	7 N	8 O	9 F	10; Ne	2×(1+3) = 8 elements 2s 2p
11; Na	12; Mg											13; Al	14; Si	15; P	16; S	17; Cl	18; Ar	2×(1+3) = 8 elements 3s 3p
19; K	20; Ca	21; Sc	22; Ti	23; V	24; Cr	25; Mn	26; Fe	27; Co	28; Ni	29; Cu	30; Zn	31; Ga	32; Ge	33; As	34; Se	35; Br	36; Kr	2×(1+3+5) = 18 elements 4s 3d 4p
37; Rb	38; Sr	39; Y	40; Zr	41; Nb	42; Mo	43; Tc	44; Ru	45; Rh	46; Pd	47; Ag	48; Cd	49; In	50; Sn	51; Sb	52; Te	53; I	54; Xe	2×(1+3+5) = 18 elements 5s 4d 5p

The sixth row of the table likewise starts with two s-block elements: caesium and barium. After this, the first f-block elements (coloured green below) begin to appear, starting with lanthanum. These are sometimes termed inner transition elements. As there are now not only 4f but also 5d and 6s subshells at similar energies, competition occurs once again with many irregular configurations; this resulted in some dispute about where exactly the f-block is supposed to begin, but most who study the matter agree that it starts at lanthanum in accordance with the Aufbau principle. Even though lanthanum does not itself fill the 4f subshell as a single atom, because of repulsion between electrons, its 4f orbitals are low enough in energy to participate in chemistry. At ytterbium, the seven 4f orbitals are completely filled with fourteen electrons; thereafter, a series of ten transition elements (lutetium through mercury) follows, and finally six main-group elements (thallium through radon) complete the period. From lutetium onwards the 4f orbitals are in the core, and from thallium onwards so are the 5d orbitals.

The seventh row is analogous to the sixth row: 7s fills (francium and radium), then 5f (actinium to nobelium), then 6d (lawrencium to copernicium), and finally 7p (nihonium to oganesson). Starting from lawrencium the 5f orbitals are in the core, and probably the 6d orbitals join the core starting from nihonium. (Note: Compounds that would use the 6d orbitals of nihonium as valence orbitals have been theoretically investigated, but they are all expected to be too unstable to observe.) Again there are a few anomalies along the way: for example, as single atoms neither actinium nor thorium actually fills the 5f subshell, and lawrencium does not fill the 6d shell, but all these subshells can still become filled in chemical environments. For a very long time, the seventh row was incomplete as most of its elements do not occur in nature. The missing elements beyond uranium started to be synthesized in the laboratory in 1940, when neptunium was made. (However, the first element to be discovered by synthesis rather than in nature was technetium in 1937.) The row was completed with the synthesis of tennessine in 2009 (the last element oganesson had already been made in 2002), and the last elements in this seventh row were given names in 2016.

1 H																															2 He	2×1 = 2 elements 1s
3 Li	4 Be																									5 B	6 C	7 N	8 O	9 F	10; Ne	2×(1+3) = 8 elements 2s 2p
11; Na	12; Mg																									13; Al	14; Si	15; P	16; S	17; Cl	18; Ar	2×(1+3) = 8 elements 3s 3p
19; K	20; Ca															21; Sc	22; Ti	23; V	24; Cr	25; Mn	26; Fe	27; Co	28; Ni	29; Cu	30; Zn	31; Ga	32; Ge	33; As	34; Se	35; Br	36; Kr	2×(1+3+5) = 18 elements 4s 3d 4p
37; Rb	38; Sr															39; Y	40; Zr	41; Nb	42; Mo	43; Tc	44; Ru	45; Rh	46; Pd	47; Ag	48; Cd	49; In	50; Sn	51; Sb	52; Te	53; I	54; Xe	2×(1+3+5) = 18 elements 5s 4d 5p
55; Cs	56; Ba	57; La	58; Ce	59; Pr	60; Nd	61; Pm	62; Sm	63; Eu	64; Gd	65; Tb	66; Dy	67; Ho	68; Er	69; Tm	70; Yb	71; Lu	72; Hf	73; Ta	74; W	75; Re	76; Os	77; Ir	78; Pt	79; Au	80; Hg	81; Tl	82; Pb	83; Bi	84; Po	85; At	86; Rn	2×(1+3+5+7) = 32 elements 6s 4f 5d 6p
87; Fr	88; Ra	89; Ac	90; Th	91; Pa	92; U	93; Np	94; Pu	95; Am	96; Cm	97; Bk	98; Cf	99; Es	100; Fm	101; Md	102; No	103; Lr	104; Rf	105; Db	106; Sg	107; Bh	108; Hs	109; Mt	110; Ds	111; Rg	112; Cn	113; Nh	114; Fl	115; Mc	116; Lv	117; Ts	118; Og	2×(1+3+5+7) = 32 elements 7s 5f 6d 7p

This completes the modern periodic table, with all seven rows completely filled to capacity.

=== Electron configuration table ===
The following table shows the electron configuration of a neutral gas-phase atom of each element. Different configurations can be favoured in different chemical environments. The main-group elements have entirely regular electron configurations; the transition and inner transition elements show twenty irregularities due to the aforementioned competition between subshells close in energy level. For the last ten elements (109–118), experimental data is lacking and therefore calculated configurations have been shown instead. Completely filled subshells have been greyed out.

Electron configurations of the chemical elements (neutral gaseous atoms in the ground state; predictions for elements 109–118)
Group:	1	2															3	4	5	6	7	8	9	10	11	12	13	14	15	16	17	18
1s:	1 H 1																															2 He; 2
[He] 2s: 2p:	3 Li; 1 -	4 Be; 2 -																									5 B 2; 1	6 C 2; 2	7 N 2; 3	8 O 2; 4	9 F 2; 5	10; Ne; 2; 6
[Ne] 3s: 3p:	11; Na; 1 -	12; Mg; 2 -																									13; Al; 2; 1	14; Si; 2; 2	15; P 2; 3	16; S 2; 4	17; Cl; 2; 5	18; Ar; 2; 6
[Ar] 4s: 3d: 4p:	19; K 1 - -	20; Ca; 2 - -															21; Sc; 2; 1 -	22; Ti; 2; 2 -	23; V 2; 3 -	24; Cr; 1; 5 -	25; Mn; 2; 5 -	26; Fe; 2; 6 -	27; Co; 2; 7 -	28; Ni; 2; 8 -	29; Cu; 1; 10 -	30; Zn; 2; 10 -	31; Ga; 2; 10; 1	32; Ge; 2; 10; 2	33; As; 2; 10; 3	34; Se; 2; 10; 4	35; Br; 2; 10; 5	36; Kr; 2; 10; 6
[Kr] 5s: 4d: 5p:	37; Rb; 1 - -	38; Sr; 2 - -															39; Y 2; 1 -	40; Zr; 2; 2 -	41; Nb; 1; 4 -	42; Mo; 1; 5 -	43; Tc; 2; 5 -	44; Ru; 1; 7 -	45; Rh; 1; 8 -	46; Pd - 10 -	47; Ag; 1; 10 -	48; Cd; 2; 10 -	49; In; 2; 10; 1	50; Sn; 2; 10; 2	51; Sb; 2; 10; 3	52; Te; 2; 10; 4	53; I 2; 10; 5	54; Xe; 2; 10; 6
[Xe] 6s: 4f: 5d: 6p:	55; Cs; 1 - - -	56; Ba; 2 - - -	57; La; 2 - 1 -	58; Ce; 2; 1; 1 -	59; Pr; 2; 3 - -	60; Nd; 2; 4 - -	61; Pm; 2; 5 - -	62; Sm; 2; 6 - -	63; Eu; 2; 7 - -	64; Gd; 2; 7; 1 -	65; Tb; 2; 9 - -	66; Dy; 2; 10 - -	67; Ho; 2; 11 - -	68; Er; 2; 12 - -	69; Tm; 2; 13 - -	70; Yb; 2; 14 - -	71; Lu; 2; 14; 1 -	72; Hf; 2; 14; 2 -	73; Ta; 2; 14; 3 -	74; W 2; 14; 4 -	75; Re; 2; 14; 5 -	76; Os; 2; 14; 6 -	77; Ir; 2; 14; 7 -	78; Pt; 1; 14; 9 -	79; Au; 1; 14; 10 -	80; Hg; 2; 14; 10 -	81; Tl; 2; 14; 10; 1	82; Pb; 2; 14; 10; 2	83; Bi; 2; 14; 10; 3	84; Po; 2; 14; 10; 4	85; At; 2; 14; 10; 5	86; Rn; 2; 14; 10; 6
[Rn] 7s: 5f: 6d: 7p:	87; Fr; 1 - - -	88; Ra; 2 - - -	89; Ac; 2 - 1 -	90; Th; 2 - 2 -	91; Pa; 2; 2; 1 -	92; U 2; 3; 1 -	93; Np; 2; 4; 1 -	94; Pu; 2; 6 - -	95; Am; 2; 7 - -	96; Cm; 2; 7; 1 -	97; Bk; 2; 9 - -	98; Cf; 2; 10 - -	99; Es; 2; 11 - -	100; Fm; 2; 12 - -	101; Md; 2; 13 - -	102; No; 2; 14 - -	103; Lr; 2; 14 - 1	104; Rf; 2; 14; 2 -	105; Db; 2; 14; 3 -	106; Sg; 2; 14; 4 -	107; Bh; 2; 14; 5 -	108; Hs; 2; 14; 6 -	109; Mt; 2; 14; 7 -	110; Ds; 2; 14; 8 -	111; Rg; 2; 14; 9 -	112; Cn; 2; 14; 10 -	113; Nh; 2; 14; 10; 1	114; Fl; 2; 14; 10; 2	115; Mc; 2; 14; 10; 3	116; Lv; 2; 14; 10; 4	117; Ts; 2; 14; 10; 5	118; Og; 2; 14; 10; 6
s-block / f-block / d-block / p-block

== Variations ==
=== Period 1 ===
Although the modern periodic table is standard today, the placement of the period 1 elements hydrogen and helium remains an open issue under discussion, and some variation can be found. Following their respective s^{1} and s^{2} electron configurations, hydrogen would be placed in group 1, and helium would be placed in group 2. The group 1 placement of hydrogen is common, but helium is almost always placed in group 18 with the other noble gases. The debate has to do with conflicting understandings of the extent to which chemical or electronic properties should decide periodic table placement.

Like the group 1 metals, hydrogen has one electron in its outermost shell and typically loses its only electron in chemical reactions. Hydrogen has some metal-like chemical properties, being able to displace some metals from their salts. But it forms a diatomic nonmetallic gas at standard conditions, unlike the alkali metals which are reactive solid metals. This and hydrogen's formation of hydrides, in which it gains an electron, brings it close to the properties of the halogens which do the same (though it is rarer for hydrogen to form H^{−} than H^{+}). Moreover, the lightest two halogens (fluorine and chlorine) are gaseous like hydrogen at standard conditions. Some properties of hydrogen are not a good fit for either group: hydrogen is neither highly oxidizing nor highly reducing and is not reactive with water. Hydrogen thus has properties corresponding to both those of the alkali metals and the halogens, but matches neither group perfectly, and is thus difficult to place by its chemistry. Therefore, while the electronic placement of hydrogen in group 1 predominates, some rarer arrangements show either hydrogen in group 17, duplicate hydrogen in both groups 1 and 17, or float it separately from all groups. This last option has nonetheless been criticized by the chemist and philosopher of science Eric Scerri on the grounds that it appears to imply that hydrogen is above the periodic law altogether, unlike all the other elements.

Helium is the only element that routinely occupies a position in the periodic table that is not consistent with its electronic structure. It has two electrons in its outermost shell, whereas the other noble gases have eight; and it is an s-block element, whereas all other noble gases are p-block elements. However it is unreactive at standard conditions, and has a full outer shell: these properties are like the noble gases in group 18, but not at all like the reactive alkaline earth metals of group 2. For these reasons helium is nearly universally placed in group 18 which its properties best match; a proposal to move helium to group 2 was rejected by IUPAC in 1988 for these reasons. Nonetheless, helium is still occasionally placed in group 2 today, and some of its physical and chemical properties are closer to the group 2 elements and support the electronic placement. Solid helium crystallises in a hexagonal close-packed structure, which matches beryllium and magnesium in group 2, but not the other noble gases in group 18. Recent theoretical developments in noble gas chemistry, in which helium is expected to show slightly less inertness than neon and to form (HeO)(LiF)_{2} with a structure similar to the analogous beryllium compound (but with no expected neon analogue), have resulted in more chemists advocating a placement of helium in group 2. This relates to the electronic argument, as the reason for neon's greater inertness is repulsion from its filled p-shell that helium lacks, though realistically it is unlikely that helium-containing molecules will be stable outside extreme low-temperature conditions (around 10 K).

The first-row anomaly in the periodic table has additionally been cited to support moving helium to group 2. It arises because the first orbital of any type is unusually small, since unlike its higher analogues, it does not experience interelectronic repulsion from a smaller orbital of the same type. This makes the first row of elements in each block have unusually small atoms, and such elements tend to exhibit characteristic kinds of anomalies for their group. Some chemists arguing for the repositioning of helium have pointed out that helium exhibits similar anomalies if it is placed in group 2, but not if it is placed in group 18: on the other hand, neon, which would be the first group 18 element if helium was removed from that spot, does exhibit similar anomalies. The relationship between helium and beryllium is then argued to resemble that between hydrogen and lithium, a placement which is much more commonly accepted. For example, because of this trend in the sizes of orbitals, a large difference in atomic radii between the first and second members of each main group is seen in groups 1 and 13–17: it exists between neon and argon, and between helium and beryllium, but not between helium and neon. This similarly affects the noble gases' boiling points and solubilities in water, where helium is too close to neon, and the large difference characteristic between the first two elements of a group appears only between neon and argon. Moving helium to group 2 makes this trend consistent in groups 2 and 18 as well, by making helium the first group 2 element and neon the first group 18 element: both exhibit the characteristic properties of a kainosymmetric first element of a group. The group 18 placement of helium nonetheless remains near-universal due to its extreme inertness. Additionally, tables that float both hydrogen and helium outside all groups may rarely be encountered.

=== Group 3 ===
In many periodic tables, the f-block is shifted one element to the right, so that lanthanum and actinium become d-block elements in group 3, and Ce–Lu and Th–Lr form the f-block. Thus the d-block is split into two very uneven portions. This is a holdover from early mistaken measurements of electron configurations; modern measurements are more consistent with the form with lutetium and lawrencium in group 3, and with La–Yb and Ac–No as the f-block.

The 4f shell is completely filled at ytterbium, and for that reason Lev Landau and Evgeny Lifshitz in 1948 considered it incorrect to group lutetium as an f-block element. They did not yet take the step of removing lanthanum from the d-block as well, but Jun Kondō realized in 1963 that lanthanum's low-temperature superconductivity implied the activity of its 4f shell. In 1965, David C. Hamilton linked this observation to its position in the periodic table, and argued that the f-block should be composed of the elements La–Yb and Ac–No. Since then, physical, chemical, and electronic evidence has supported this assignment. The issue was brought to wide attention by William B. Jensen in 1982, and the reassignment of lutetium and lawrencium to group 3 was supported by IUPAC reports dating from 1988 (when the 1–18 group numbers were recommended) and 2021. The variation nonetheless still exists because most textbook writers are not aware of the issue.

A third form can sometimes be encountered in which the spaces below yttrium in group 3 are left empty, such as the table appearing on the IUPAC web site, but this creates an inconsistency with quantum mechanics by making the f-block 15 elements wide (La–Lu and Ac–Lr) even though only 14 electrons can fit in an f-subshell. There is moreover some confusion in the literature on which elements are then implied to be in group 3. While the 2021 IUPAC report noted that 15-element-wide f-blocks are supported by some practitioners of a specialized branch of relativistic quantum mechanics focusing on the properties of superheavy elements, the project's opinion was that such interest-dependent concerns should not have any bearing on how the periodic table is presented to "the general chemical and scientific community". Other authors focusing on superheavy elements since clarified that the "15th entry of the f-block represents the first slot of the d-block which is left vacant to indicate the place of the f-block inserts", which would imply that this form still has lutetium and lawrencium (the 15th entries in question) as d-block elements in group 3. Indeed, when IUPAC publications expand the table to 32 columns, they make this clear and place lutetium and lawrencium under yttrium in group 3.

Several arguments in favour of Sc-Y-La-Ac can be encountered in the literature, but they have been challenged as being logically inconsistent. For example, it has been argued that lanthanum and actinium cannot be f-block elements because as individual gas-phase atoms, they have not begun to fill the f-subshells. But the same is true of thorium which is never disputed as an f-block element, and this argument overlooks the problem on the other end: that the f-shells complete filling at ytterbium and nobelium, matching the Sc-Y-Lu-Lr form, and not at lutetium and lawrencium as the Sc-Y-La-Ac form would have it. Not only are such exceptional configurations in the minority, but they have also in any case never been considered as relevant for positioning any other elements on the periodic table: in gaseous atoms, the d-shells complete their filling at copper, palladium, and gold, but it is universally accepted by chemists that these configurations are exceptional and that the d-block really ends in accordance with the Madelung rule at zinc, cadmium, and mercury. The relevant fact for placement is that lanthanum and actinium (like thorium) have valence f orbitals that can become occupied in chemical environments, whereas lutetium and lawrencium do not: their f-shells are in the core, and cannot be used for chemical reactions. Thus the relationship between yttrium and lanthanum is only a secondary relationship between elements with the same number of valence electrons but different kinds of valence orbitals, such as that between chromium and uranium; whereas the relationship between yttrium and lutetium is primary, sharing both valence electron count and valence orbital type.

== Periodic trends ==
As chemical reactions involve the valence electrons, elements with similar outer electron configurations may be expected to react similarly and form compounds with similar proportions of elements in them. Such elements are placed in the same group, and thus there tend to be clear similarities and trends in chemical behaviour as one proceeds down a group. As analogous configurations occur at regular intervals, the properties of the elements thus exhibit periodic recurrences, hence the name of the periodic table and the periodic law. These periodic recurrences were noticed well before the underlying theory that explains them was developed.

=== Atomic radius ===
Historically, the physical size of atoms was unknown until the early 20th century. The first calculated estimate of the atomic radius of hydrogen was published by physicist Arthur Haas in 1910 to within an order of magnitude (a factor of 10) of the accepted value, the Bohr radius (~0.529 Å). In his model, Haas used a single-electron configuration based on the classical atomic model proposed by J. J. Thomson in 1904, often called the plum-pudding model.

Atomic radii (the size of atoms) are dependent on the sizes of their outermost orbitals. They generally decrease going left to right along the main-group elements, because the nuclear charge increases but the outer electrons are still in the same shell. However, going down a column, the radii generally increase, because the outermost electrons are in higher shells that are thus further away from the nucleus. The first row of each block is abnormally small, due to an effect called kainosymmetry or primogenic repulsion: the 1s, 2p, 3d, and 4f subshells have no inner analogues. For example, the 2p orbitals do not experience strong repulsion from the 1s and 2s orbitals, which have quite different angular charge distributions, and hence are not very large; but the 3p orbitals experience strong repulsion from the 2p orbitals, which have similar angular charge distributions. Thus higher s-, p-, d-, and f-subshells experience strong repulsion from their inner analogues, which have approximately the same angular distribution of charge, and must expand to avoid this. This makes significant differences arise between the small 2p elements, which prefer multiple bonding, and the larger 3p and higher p-elements, which do not. Similar anomalies arise for the 1s, 2p, 3d, 4f, and the hypothetical 5g elements: the degree of this first-row anomaly is highest for the s-block, is moderate for the p-block, and is less pronounced for the d- and f-blocks.

In the transition elements, an inner shell is filling, but the size of the atom is still determined by the outer electrons. The increasing nuclear charge across the series and the increased number of inner electrons for shielding somewhat compensate each other, so the decrease in radius is smaller. The 4p and 5d atoms, coming immediately after new types of transition series are first introduced, are smaller than would have been expected, because the added core 3d and 4f subshells provide only incomplete shielding of the nuclear charge for the outer electrons. Hence for example gallium atoms are slightly smaller than aluminium atoms. Together with kainosymmetry, this results in an even-odd difference between the periods (except in the s-block) (Note: Properties of the p-block elements nevertheless do affect the succeeding s-block elements. The 3s shell in sodium is above a kainosymmetric 2p core, but the 4s shell in potassium is above the much larger 3p core. Hence while one would have already expected potassium atoms to be larger than sodium atoms, the size difference is greater than usual.) that is sometimes known as secondary periodicity: elements in even periods have smaller atomic radii and prefer to lose fewer electrons, while elements in odd periods (except the first) differ in the opposite direction. Thus for example many properties in the p-block show a zigzag rather than a smooth trend along the group. For example, phosphorus and antimony in odd periods of group 15 readily reach the +5 oxidation state, whereas nitrogen, arsenic, and bismuth in even periods prefer to stay at +3. A similar situation holds for the d-block, with lutetium through tungsten atoms being slightly smaller than yttrium through molybdenum atoms respectively.

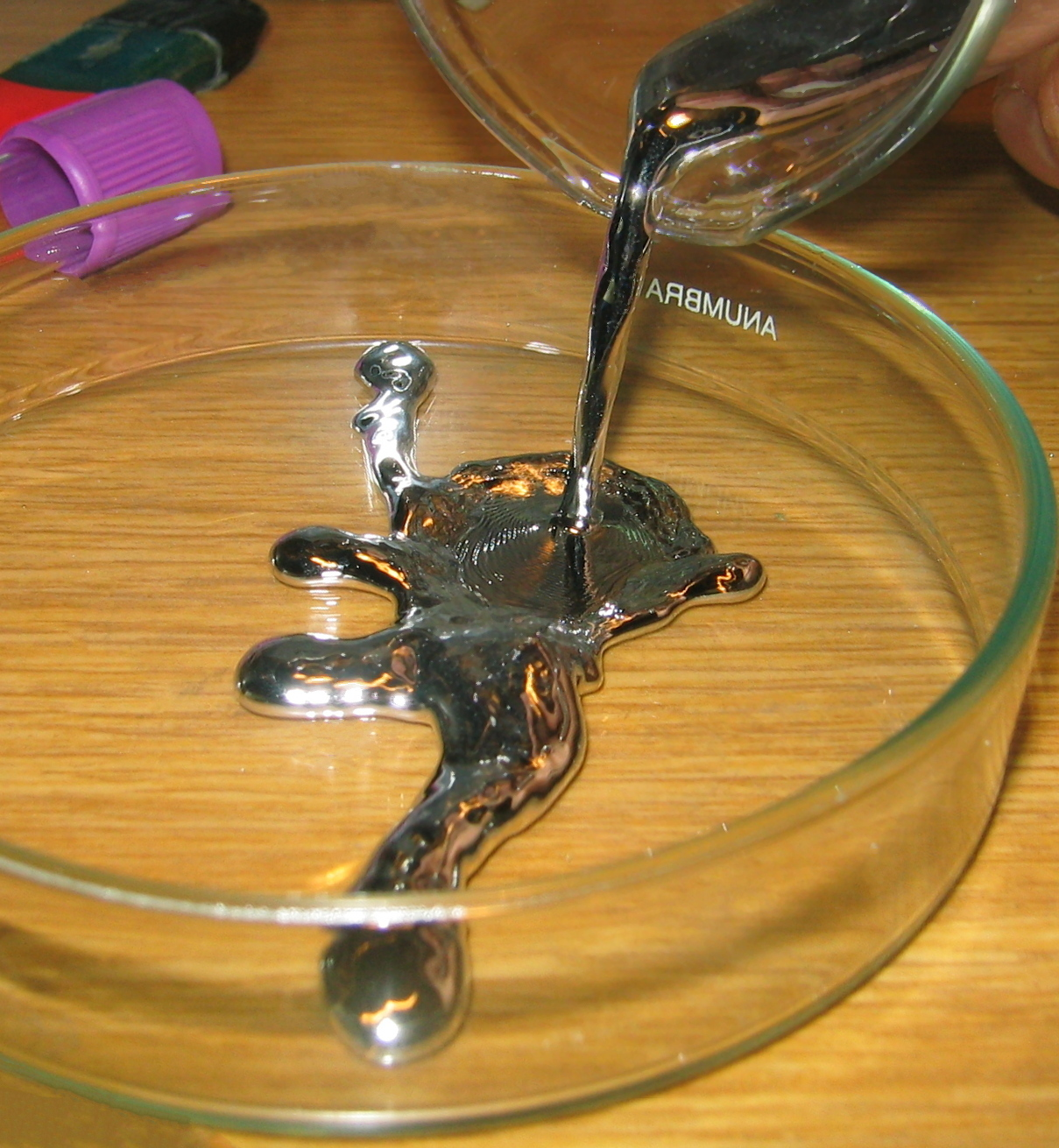
Liquid mercury. Its liquid state at standard conditions is the result of relativistic effects.

Thallium and lead atoms are about the same size as indium and tin atoms respectively, but from bismuth to radon the 6p atoms are larger than the analogous 5p atoms. This happens because when atomic nuclei become highly charged, special relativity becomes needed to gauge the effect of the nucleus on the electron cloud. These relativistic effects result in heavy elements increasingly having differing properties compared to their lighter homologues in the periodic table. Spin–orbit interaction splits the p subshell: one p orbital is relativistically stabilized and shrunken (it fills in thallium and lead), but the other two (filling in bismuth through radon) are relativistically destabilized and expanded. Relativistic effects also explain why gold is golden and mercury is a liquid at room temperature. They are expected to become very strong in the late seventh period, potentially leading to a collapse of periodicity. Electron configurations are only clearly known until element 108 (hassium), and experimental chemistry beyond 108 has only been done for elements 112 (copernicium) through 115 (moscovium), so the chemical characterization of the heaviest elements remains a topic of current research.

The trend that atomic radii decrease from left to right is also present in ionic radii, though it is more difficult to examine because the most common ions of consecutive elements normally differ in charge. Ions with the same electron configuration decrease in size as their atomic number rises, due to increased attraction from the more positively charged nucleus: thus for example ionic radii decrease in the series Se^{2−}, Br^{−}, Rb^{+}, Sr^{2+}, Y^{3+}, Zr^{4+}, Nb^{5+}, Mo^{6+}, Tc^{7+}. Ions of the same element get smaller as more electrons are removed, because the attraction from the nucleus begins to outweigh the repulsion between electrons that causes electron clouds to expand: thus for example ionic radii decrease in the series V^{2+}, V^{3+}, V^{4+}, V^{5+}.

=== Ionisation energy ===
Graph of first ionisation energies of the elements in electronvolts (predictions used for elements 109–118)

The first ionisation energy of an atom is the energy required to remove an electron from it. This varies with the atomic radius: ionisation energy increases left to right and down to up, because electrons that are closer to the nucleus are held more tightly and are more difficult to remove. Ionisation energy thus is minimized at the first element of each period – hydrogen and the alkali metals – and then generally rises until it reaches the noble gas at the right edge of the period. There are some exceptions to this trend, such as oxygen, where the electron being removed is paired and thus interelectronic repulsion makes it easier to remove than expected.

In the transition series, the outer electrons are preferentially lost even though the inner orbitals are filling. For example, in the 3d series, the 4s electrons are lost first even though the 3d orbitals are being filled. The shielding effect of adding an extra 3d electron approximately compensates the rise in nuclear charge, and therefore the ionisation energies stay mostly constant, though there is a small increase especially at the end of each transition series.

As metal atoms tend to lose electrons in chemical reactions, ionisation energy is generally correlated with chemical reactivity, although there are other factors involved as well.

=== Electron affinity ===
Trend in electron affinities

The opposite property to ionisation energy is the electron affinity, which is the energy released when adding an electron to the atom. A passing electron will be more readily attracted to an atom if it feels the pull of the nucleus more strongly, and especially if there is an available partially filled outer orbital that can accommodate it. Therefore, electron affinity tends to increase down to up and left to right. The exception is the last column, the noble gases, which have a full shell and have no room for another electron. This gives the halogens in the next-to-last column the highest electron affinities.

Some atoms, like the noble gases, have no electron affinity: they cannot form stable gas-phase anions. (They can form metastable resonances if the incoming electron arrives with enough kinetic energy, but these inevitably and rapidly autodetach: for example, the lifetime of the most long-lived He^{−} level is about 359 microseconds.) The noble gases, having high ionisation energies and no electron affinity, have little inclination towards gaining or losing electrons and are generally unreactive.

Some exceptions to the trends occur: oxygen and fluorine have lower electron affinities than their heavier homologues sulfur and chlorine, because they are small atoms and hence the newly added electron would experience significant repulsion from the already present ones. For the nonmetallic elements, electron affinity likewise somewhat correlates with reactivity, but not perfectly since other factors are involved. For example, fluorine has a lower electron affinity than chlorine (because of extreme interelectronic repulsion for the very small fluorine atom), but is more reactive.

=== Valence and oxidation states ===
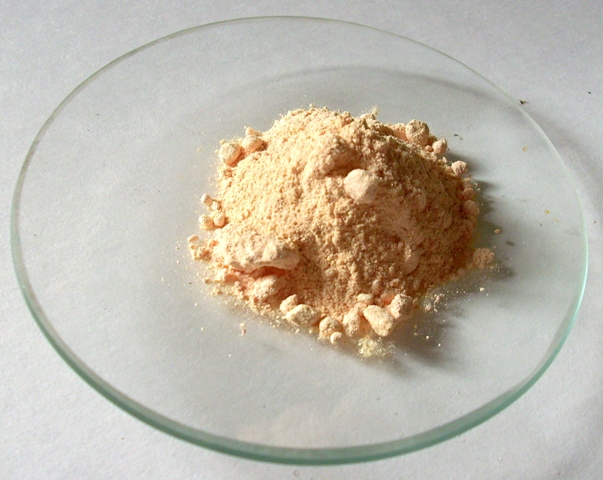
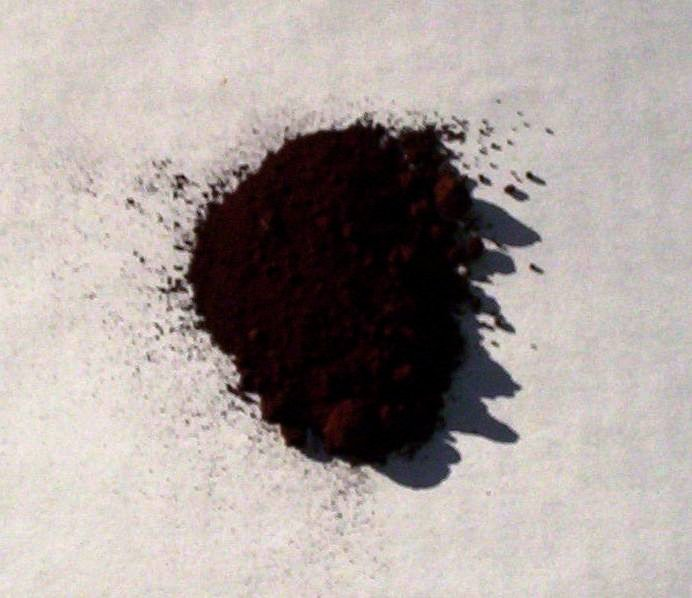
Lead(II) oxide (PbO, left) and lead(IV) oxide (PbO_{2}, right), the two stable oxides of lead

The valence of an element can be defined either as the number of hydrogen atoms that can combine with it to form a simple binary hydride, or as twice the number of oxygen atoms that can combine with it to form a simple binary oxide (that is, not a peroxide or a superoxide). The valences of the main-group elements are directly related to the group number: the hydrides in the main groups 1–2 and 13–17 follow the formulae MH, MH_{2}, MH_{3}, MH_{4}, MH_{3}, MH_{2}, and finally MH. The highest oxides instead increase in valence, following the formulae M_{2}O, MO, M_{2}O_{3}, MO_{2}, M_{2}O_{5}, MO_{3}, M_{2}O_{7}. (Note: There are many lower oxides as well: for example, phosphorus in group 15 forms two oxides, P_{2}O_{3} and P_{2}O_{5}.) Today the notion of valence has been extended by that of the oxidation state, which is the formal charge left on an element when all other elements in a compound have been removed as their ions.

The electron configuration suggests a ready explanation from the number of electrons available for bonding; indeed, the number of valence electrons starts at 1 in group 1, and then increases towards the right side of the periodic table, only resetting at 3 whenever each new block starts. Thus in period 6, Cs–Ba have 1–2 valence electrons; La–Yb have 3–16; Lu–Hg have 3–12; and Tl–Rn have 3–8. However, towards the right side of the d- and f-blocks, the theoretical maximum corresponding to using all valence electrons is not achievable at all; the same situation affects oxygen, fluorine, and the light noble gases up to krypton.

Number of valence electrons
	1	2															3	4	5	6	7	8	9	10	11	12	13	14	15	16	17	18
1	H 1																															He; 2
2	Li; 1	Be; 2																									B 3	C 4	N 5	O 6	F 7	Ne; 8
3	Na; 1	Mg; 2																									Al; 3	Si; 4	P 5	S 6	Cl; 7	Ar; 8
4	K 1	Ca; 2															Sc; 3	Ti; 4	V 5	Cr; 6	Mn; 7	Fe; 8	Co; 9	Ni; 10	Cu; 11	Zn; 12	Ga; 3	Ge; 4	As; 5	Se; 6	Br; 7	Kr; 8
5	Rb; 1	Sr; 2															Y 3	Zr; 4	Nb; 5	Mo; 6	Tc; 7	Ru; 8	Rh; 9	Pd; 10	Ag; 11	Cd; 12	In; 3	Sn; 4	Sb; 5	Te; 6	I 7	Xe; 8
6	Cs; 1	Ba; 2	La; 3	Ce; 4	Pr; 5	Nd; 6	Pm; 7	Sm; 8	Eu; 9	Gd; 10	Tb; 11	Dy; 12	Ho; 13	Er; 14	Tm; 15	Yb; 16	Lu; 3	Hf; 4	Ta; 5	W 6	Re; 7	Os; 8	Ir; 9	Pt; 10	Au; 11	Hg; 12	Tl; 3	Pb; 4	Bi; 5	Po; 6	At; 7	Rn; 8
7	Fr; 1	Ra; 2	Ac; 3	Th; 4	Pa; 5	U 6	Np; 7	Pu; 8	Am; 9	Cm; 10	Bk; 11	Cf; 12	Es; 13	Fm; 14	Md; 15	No; 16	Lr; 3	Rf; 4	Db; 5	Sg; 6	Bh; 7	Hs; 8	Mt; 9	Ds; 10	Rg; 11	Cn; 12	Nh; 3	Fl; 4	Mc; 5	Lv; 6	Ts; 7	Og; 8

A full explanation requires considering the energy that would be released in forming compounds with different valences rather than simply considering electron configurations alone. For example, magnesium forms Mg^{2+} rather than Mg^{+} cations when dissolved in water, because the latter would spontaneously disproportionate into Mg^{0} and Mg^{2+} cations. This is because the enthalpy of hydration (surrounding the cation with water molecules) increases in magnitude with the charge and radius of the ion. In Mg^{+}, the outermost orbital (which determines ionic radius) is still 3s, so the hydration enthalpy is small and insufficient to compensate the energy required to remove the electron; but ionizing again to Mg^{2+} uncovers the core 2p subshell, making the hydration enthalpy large enough to allow magnesium(II) compounds to form. For similar reasons, the common oxidation states of the heavier p-block elements (where the ns electrons become lower in energy than the np) tend to vary by steps of 2, because that is necessary to uncover an inner subshell and decrease the ionic radius (e.g. Tl^{+} uncovers 6s, and Tl^{3+} uncovers 5d, so once thallium loses two electrons it tends to lose the third one as well). Analogous arguments based on orbital hybridization can be used for the less electronegative p-block elements. (Note: The normally "forbidden" intermediate oxidation states may be stabilized by forming dimers, as in [Cl_{3}Ga–GaCl_{3}]^{2−} (gallium in the +2 oxidation state) or S_{2}F_{10} (sulfur in the +5 oxidation state). Some compounds that appear to be in such intermediate oxidation states are actually mixed-valence compounds, such as Sb_{2}O_{4}, which contains both Sb(III) and Sb(V).)

Oxidation states of the transition metals. The solid dots show common oxidation states, and the hollow dots show possible but unlikely states.

For transition metals, common oxidation states are nearly always at least +2 for similar reasons (uncovering the next subshell); this holds even for the metals with anomalous d^{x+1}s^{1} or d^{x+2}s^{0} configurations (except for silver), because repulsion between d-electrons means that the movement of the second electron from the s- to the d-subshell does not appreciably change its ionisation energy. Because ionizing the transition metals further does not uncover any new inner subshells, their oxidation states tend to vary by steps of 1 instead. The lanthanides and late actinides generally show a stable +3 oxidation state, removing the outer s-electrons and then (usually) one electron from the (n−2)f orbitals, that are similar in energy to ns. The common and maximum oxidation states of the d- and f-block elements tend to depend on the ionisation energies. As the energy difference between the (n−1)d and ns orbitals rises along each transition series, it becomes less energetically favourable to ionize further electrons. Thus, the early transition metal groups tend to prefer higher oxidation states, but the +2 oxidation state becomes more stable for the late transition metal groups. The highest formal oxidation state thus increases from +3 at the beginning of each d-block row, to +7 or +8 in the middle (e.g. OsO_{4}), and then decrease to +2 at the end. The lanthanides and late actinides usually have high fourth ionisation energies and hence rarely surpass the +3 oxidation state, whereas early actinides have low fourth ionisation energies and so for example neptunium and plutonium can reach +7. The very last actinides go further than the lanthanides towards low oxidation states: mendelevium is more easily reduced to the +2 state than thulium or even europium (the lanthanide with the most stable +2 state, on account of its half-filled f-shell), and nobelium outright favours +2 over +3, in contrast to ytterbium.

As elements in the same group share the same valence configurations, they usually exhibit similar chemical behaviour. For example, the alkali metals in the first group all have one valence electron, and form a very homogeneous class of elements: they are all soft and reactive metals. However, there are many factors involved, and groups can often be rather heterogeneous. For instance, hydrogen also has one valence electron and is in the same group as the alkali metals, but its chemical behaviour is quite different. The stable elements of group 14 comprise a nonmetal (carbon), two semiconductors (silicon and germanium), and two metals (tin and lead); they are nonetheless united by having four valence electrons. This often leads to similarities in maximum and minimum oxidation states (e.g. sulfur and selenium in group 16 both have maximum oxidation state +6, as in SO_{3} and SeO_{3}, and minimum oxidation state −2, as in sulfides and selenides); but not always (e.g. oxygen is not known to form oxidation state +6, despite being in the same group as sulfur and selenium).

=== Electronegativity ===
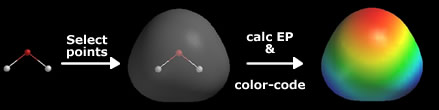
Electrostatic potential map of a water molecule, where the oxygen atom has a more negative charge (red) than the positive (blue) hydrogen atoms

Another important property of elements is their electronegativity. Atoms can form covalent bonds to each other by sharing electrons in pairs, creating an overlap of valence orbitals. The degree to which each atom attracts the shared electron pair depends on the atom's electronegativity – the tendency of an atom towards gaining or losing electrons. The more electronegative atom will tend to attract the electron pair more, and the less electronegative (or more electropositive) one will attract it less. In extreme cases, the electron can be thought of as having been passed completely from the more electropositive atom to the more electronegative one, though this is a simplification. The bond then binds two ions, one positive (having given up the electron) and one negative (having accepted it), and is termed an ionic bond.

Electronegativity depends on how strongly the nucleus can attract an electron pair, and so it exhibits a similar variation to the other properties already discussed: electronegativity tends to fall going up to down, and rise going left to right. The alkali and alkaline earth metals are among the most electropositive elements, while the chalcogens, halogens, and noble gases are among the most electronegative ones.

Electronegativity is generally measured on the Pauling scale, on which the most electronegative reactive atom (fluorine) is given electronegativity 4.0, and the least electronegative atom (caesium) is given electronegativity 0.79. In fact neon is the most electronegative element, but the Pauling scale cannot measure its electronegativity because it does not form covalent bonds with most elements.

An element's electronegativity varies with the identity and number of the atoms it is bonded to, as well as how many electrons it has already lost: an atom becomes more electronegative when it has lost more electrons. This sometimes makes a large difference: lead in the +2 oxidation state has electronegativity 1.87 on the Pauling scale, while lead in the +4 oxidation state has electronegativity 2.33.

=== Metallicity ===
The diamond-cubic structure, a giant covalent structure adopted by carbon (as diamond), as well as by silicon, germanium, and (grey) tin, all in group 14. (In grey tin, the band gap vanishes and metallization occurs. Tin has another allotrope, white tin, whose structure is even more metallic.)

A simple substance is a substance formed from atoms of one chemical element. The simple substances of the more electronegative atoms tend to share electrons (form covalent bonds) with each other. They form either small molecules (like hydrogen or oxygen) or giant structures stretching indefinitely (like carbon or silicon). The noble gases simply stay as single atoms, as they already have a full shell. Substances composed of discrete molecules or single atoms are held together by weaker attractive forces between the molecules, such as the London dispersion force: as electrons move within the molecules, they create momentary imbalances of electrical charge, which induce similar imbalances on nearby molecules and create synchronized movements of electrons across many neighbouring molecules.

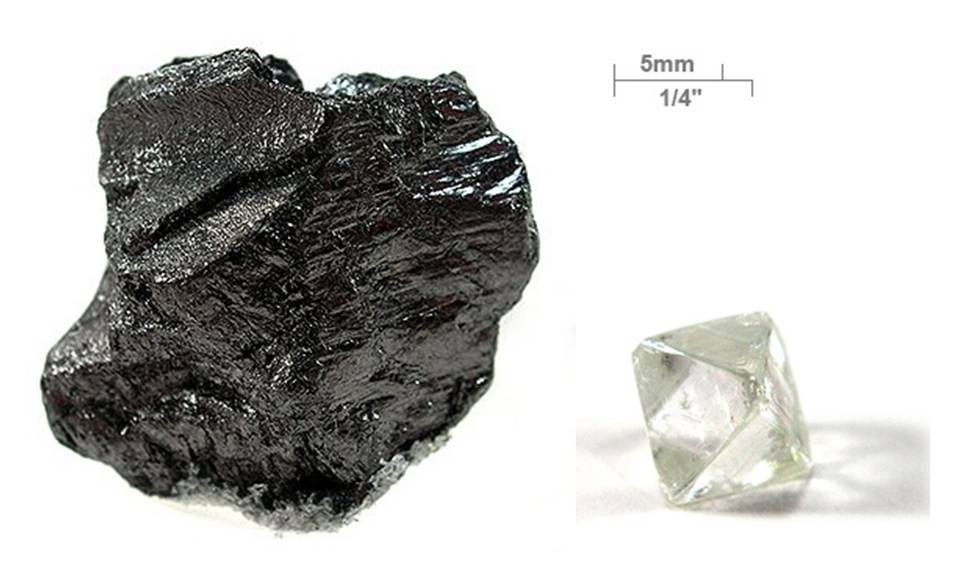
Graphite and diamond, two allotropes of carbon

The more electropositive atoms tend to instead lose electrons, creating a "sea" of electrons engulfing cations. The outer orbitals of one atom overlap to share electrons with all its neighbours, creating a giant structure of molecular orbitals extending over all the atoms. This negatively charged "sea" pulls on all the ions and keeps them together in a metallic bond. Elements forming such bonds are often called metals; those which do not are often called nonmetals. Some elements can form multiple simple substances with different structures: these are called allotropes. For example, diamond and graphite are two allotropes of carbon. (Note: The boundary between dispersion forces and metallic bonding is gradual, like that between ionic and covalent bonding. Characteristic metallic properties do not appear in small mercury clusters, but do appear in large ones.)

The metallicity of an element can be predicted from electronic properties. When atomic orbitals overlap during metallic or covalent bonding, they create both bonding and antibonding molecular orbitals of equal capacity, with the antibonding orbitals of higher energy. Net bonding character occurs when there are more electrons in the bonding orbitals than there are in the antibonding orbitals. Metallic bonding is thus possible when the number of electrons delocalized by each atom is less than twice the number of orbitals contributing to the overlap. This is the situation for elements in groups 1 through 13; they also have too few valence electrons to form giant covalent structures where all atoms take equivalent positions, and so almost all of them metallise. The exceptions are hydrogen and boron, which have too high an ionisation energy. Hydrogen thus forms a covalent H_{2} molecule, and boron forms a giant covalent structure based on icosahedral B_{12} clusters. In a metal, the bonding and antibonding orbitals have overlapping energies, creating a single band that electrons can freely flow through, allowing for electrical conduction.

Graph of carbon atoms being brought together to form a diamond crystal, demonstrating formation of the electronic band structure and band gap. The right graph shows the energy levels as a function of the spacing between atoms. When far apart (right side of graph) all the atoms have discrete valence orbitals p and s with the same energies. However, when the atoms come closer (left side), their electron orbitals begin to spatially overlap. The orbitals hybridize into N molecular orbitals each with a different energy, where N is the number of atoms in the crystal. Since N is such a large number, adjacent orbitals are extremely close together in energy so the orbitals can be considered a continuous energy band. At the actual diamond crystal cell size (denoted by a), two bands are formed, called the valence and conduction bands, separated by a 5.5 eV band gap. (Here only the valence 2s and 2p electrons have been illustrated; the 1s orbitals do not significantly overlap, so the bands formed from them are much narrower.)

In group 14, both metallic and covalent bonding become possible. In a diamond crystal, covalent bonds between carbon atoms are strong, because they have a small atomic radius and thus the nucleus has more of a hold on the electrons. Therefore, the bonding orbitals that result are much lower in energy than the antibonding orbitals, and there is no overlap, so electrical conduction becomes impossible: carbon is a nonmetal. However, covalent bonding becomes weaker for larger atoms and the energy gap between the bonding and antibonding orbitals decreases. Therefore, silicon and germanium have smaller band gaps and are semiconductors at ambient conditions: electrons can cross the gap when thermally excited. (Boron is also a semiconductor at ambient conditions.) The band gap disappears in tin, so that tin and lead become metals. As the temperature rises, all nonmetals develop some semiconducting properties, to a greater or lesser extent depending on the size of the band gap. Thus metals and nonmetals may be distinguished by the temperature dependence of their electrical conductivity: a metal's conductivity lowers as temperature rises (because thermal motion makes it more difficult for the electrons to flow freely), whereas a nonmetal's conductivity rises (as more electrons may be excited to cross the gap).

Elements in groups 15 through 17 have too many electrons to form giant covalent molecules that stretch in all three dimensions. For the lighter elements, the bonds in small diatomic molecules are so strong that a condensed phase is disfavoured: thus nitrogen (N_{2}), oxygen (O_{2}), white phosphorus and yellow arsenic (P_{4} and As_{4}), sulfur and red selenium (S_{8} and Se_{8}), and the stable halogens (F_{2}, Cl_{2}, Br_{2}, and I_{2}) readily form covalent molecules with few atoms. The heavier ones tend to form long chains (e.g. red phosphorus, grey selenium, tellurium) or layered structures (e.g. carbon as graphite, black phosphorus, grey arsenic, antimony, bismuth) that only extend in one or two rather than three dimensions. Both kinds of structures can be found as allotropes of phosphorus, arsenic, and selenium, although the long-chained allotropes are more stable in all three. As these structures do not use all their orbitals for bonding, they end up with bonding, nonbonding, and antibonding bands in order of increasing energy. Similarly to group 14, the band gaps shrink for the heavier elements and free movement of electrons between the chains or layers becomes possible. Thus for example black phosphorus, black arsenic, grey selenium, tellurium, and iodine are semiconductors; grey arsenic, antimony, and bismuth are semimetals (exhibiting quasi-metallic conduction, with a very small band overlap); and polonium and probably astatine are true metals. Finally, the natural group 18 elements all stay as individual atoms. (Note: All this describes the situation at standard pressure. Under sufficiently high pressure, the band gaps of any solid drop to zero and metallization occurs. Thus for example at about 170 kbar iodine becomes a metal, and metallic hydrogen should form at pressures of about four million atmospheres. See metallization pressure for values for all nonmetals.)

The dividing line between metals and nonmetals is roughly diagonal from top left to bottom right, with the transition series appearing to the left of this diagonal (as they have many available orbitals for overlap). This is expected, as metallicity tends to be correlated with electropositivity and the willingness to lose electrons, which increases right to left and up to down. Thus the metals greatly outnumber the nonmetals. Elements near the borderline are difficult to classify: they tend to have properties that are intermediate between those of metals and nonmetals, and may have some properties characteristic of both. They are often termed semimetals or metalloids. The term "semimetal" used in this sense should not be confused with its strict physical sense having to do with band structure: bismuth is physically a semimetal, but is generally considered a metal by chemists.

The following table considers the most stable allotropes at standard conditions. The elements coloured yellow form simple substances that are well-characterised by metallic bonding. Elements coloured light blue form giant network covalent structures, whereas those coloured dark blue form small covalently bonded molecules that are held together by weaker van der Waals forces. The noble gases are coloured in violet: their molecules are single atoms and no covalent bonding occurs. Greyed-out cells are for elements which have not been prepared in sufficient quantities for their most stable allotropes to have been characterized in this way. Theoretical considerations and current experimental evidence suggest that all of those elements would metallise if they could form condensed phases, except perhaps for oganesson. (Note: Descriptions of the structures formed by the elements can be found throughout Greenwood and Earnshaw. There are two borderline cases. Arsenic's most stable form conducts electricity like a metal, but the bonding is significantly more localized to the nearest neighbours than it is for the similar structures of antimony and bismuth, and unlike normal metals it does not have a long liquid range, but rather sublimes instead. Hence its structure is better treated as network covalent. Carbon as graphite shows metallic conduction parallel to its planes, but is a semiconductor perpendicular to them. Some computations predict copernicium and flerovium to be nonmetallic, but the most recent experiments on them suggest that they are metallic. Astatine is calculated to metallise at standard conditions, so presumably tennessine should as well.)

Bonding of simple substances in the periodic table
	1	2															3	4	5	6	7	8	9	10	11	12	13	14	15	16	17	18
Group →
↓ Period
1	H																															He
2	Li	Be																									B	C	N	O	F	Ne
3	Na	Mg																									Al	Si	P	S	Cl	Ar
4	K	Ca															Sc	Ti	V	Cr	Mn	Fe	Co	Ni	Cu	Zn	Ga	Ge	As	Se	Br	Kr
5	Rb	Sr															Y	Zr	Nb	Mo	Tc	Ru	Rh	Pd	Ag	Cd	In	Sn	Sb	Te	I	Xe
6	Cs	Ba	La	Ce	Pr	Nd	Pm	Sm	Eu	Gd	Tb	Dy	Ho	Er	Tm	Yb	Lu	Hf	Ta	W	Re	Os	Ir	Pt	Au	Hg	Tl	Pb	Bi	Po	At	Rn
7	Fr	Ra	Ac	Th	Pa	U	Np	Pu	Am	Cm	Bk	Cf	Es	Fm	Md	No	Lr	Rf	Db	Sg	Bh	Hs	Mt	Ds	Rg	Cn	Nh	Fl	Mc	Lv	Ts	Og

Metallic Network covalent Molecular covalent Single atoms Unknown Background color shows bonding of simple substances in the periodic table. If there are several, the most stable allotrope is considered.

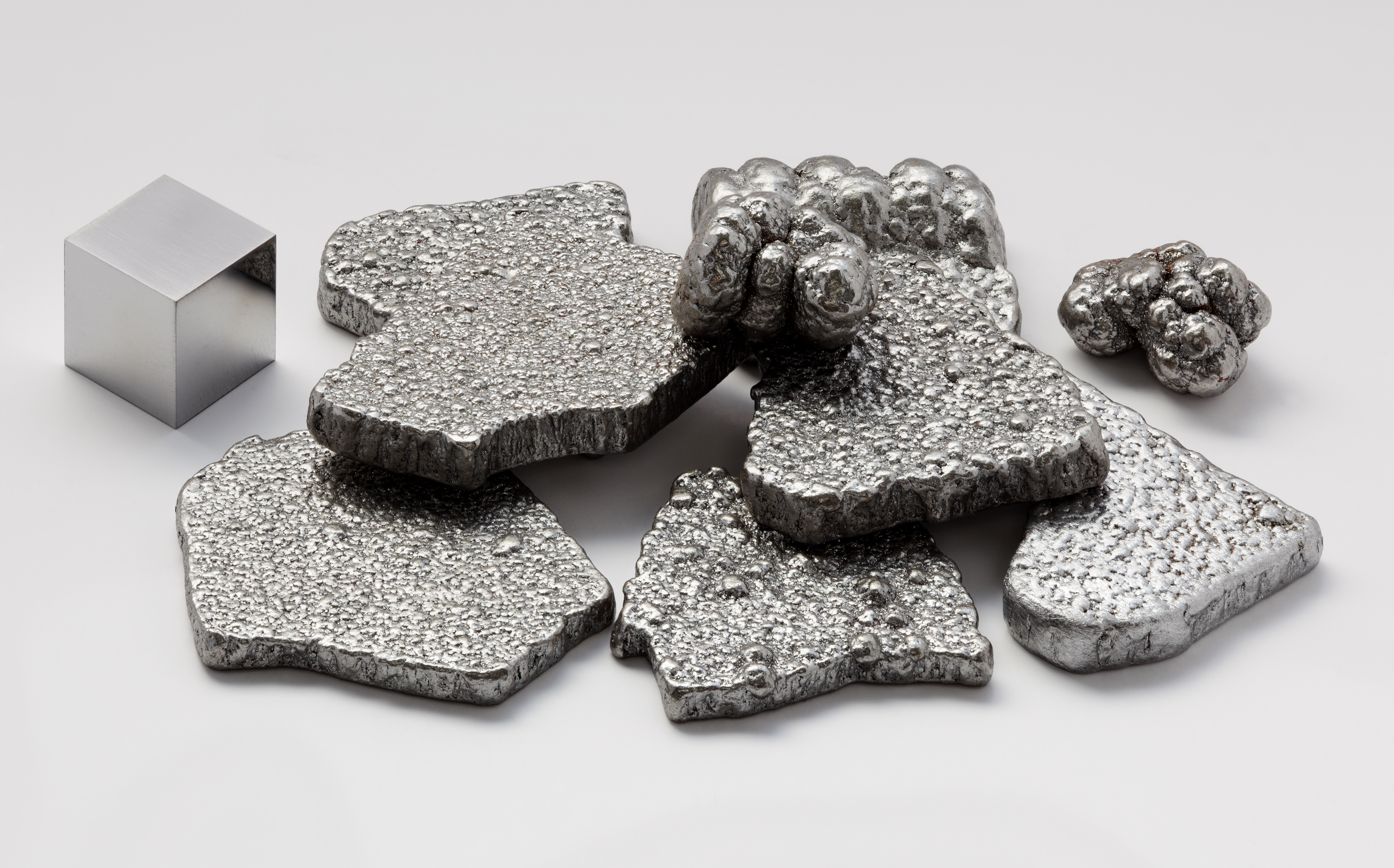
Iron, a metal

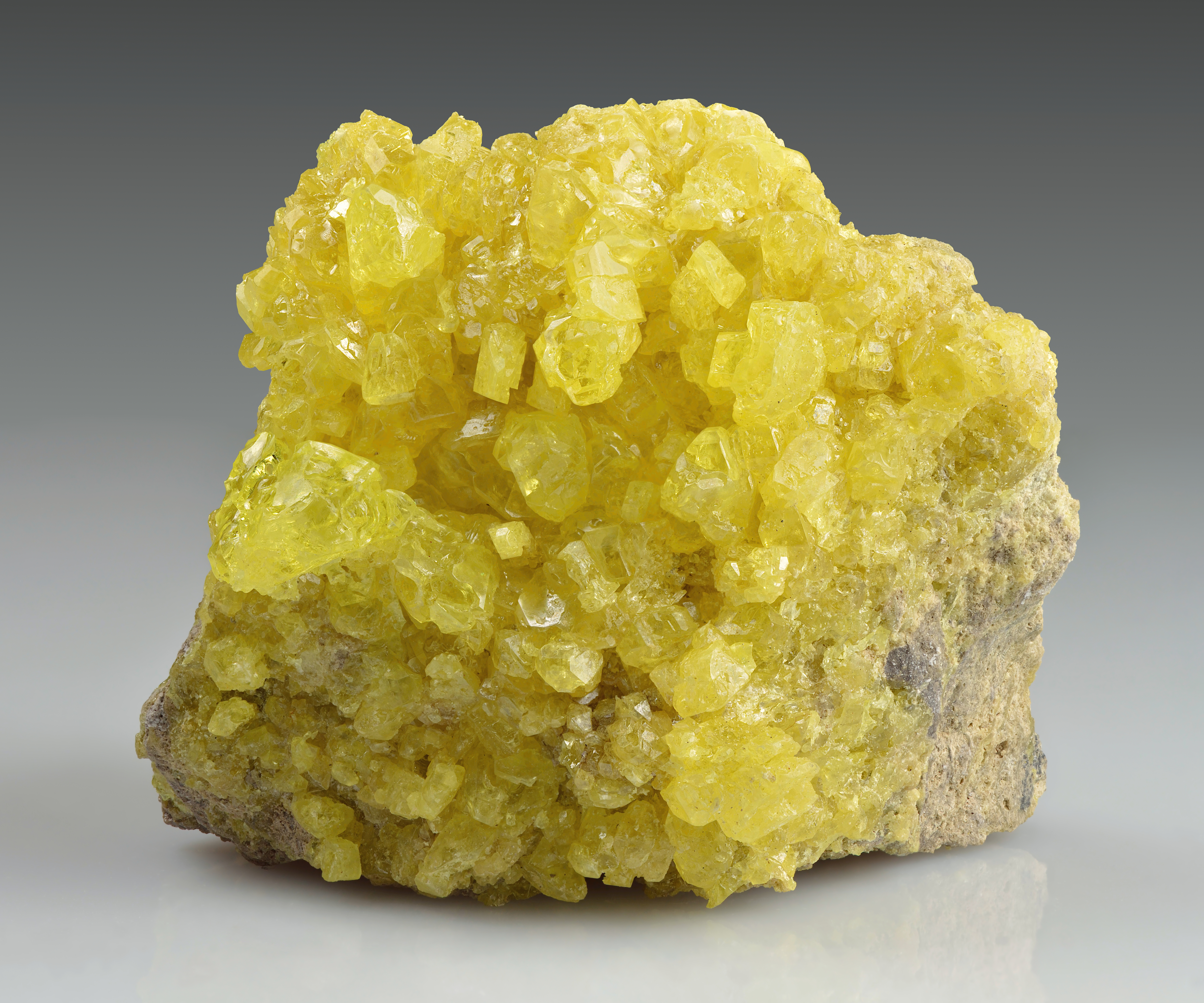
Sulfur, a nonmetal

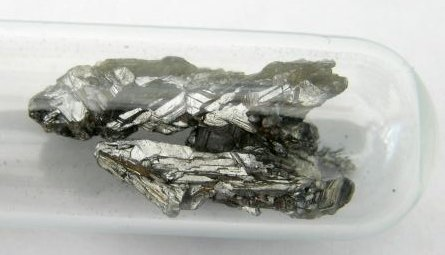
Arsenic, an element often called a semi-metal or metalloid

Generally, metals are shiny and dense. They usually have high melting and boiling points due to the strength of the metallic bond, and are often malleable and ductile (easily stretched and shaped) because the atoms can move relative to each other without breaking the metallic bond. They conduct electricity because their electrons are free to move in all three dimensions. Similarly, they conduct heat, which is transferred by the electrons as extra kinetic energy: they move faster. These properties persist in the liquid state, as although the crystal structure is destroyed on melting, the atoms still touch and the metallic bond persists, though it is weakened. Metals tend to be reactive towards nonmetals. Some exceptions can be found to these generalizations: for example, beryllium, chromium, manganese, antimony, bismuth, and uranium are brittle (not an exhaustive list); chromium is extremely hard; gallium, rubidium, caesium, and mercury are liquid at or close to room temperature; (Note: See melting points of the elements (data page). The same is probably true of francium, but due to its extreme instability, this has never been experimentally confirmed. Copernicium and flerovium are expected to be liquids, similar to mercury, and experimental evidence suggests that they are metals.) and noble metals such as gold are chemically very inert.

Nonmetals exhibit different properties. Those forming giant covalent crystals exhibit high melting and boiling points, as it takes considerable energy to overcome the strong covalent bonds. Those forming discrete molecules are held together mostly by dispersion forces, which are more easily overcome; thus they tend to have lower melting and boiling points, and many are liquids or gases at room temperature. Nonmetals are often dull-looking. They tend to be reactive towards metals, except for the noble gases, which are inert towards most substances. They are brittle when solid as their atoms are held tightly in place. They are less dense and conduct electricity poorly, because there are no mobile electrons. Near the borderline, band gaps are small and thus many elements in that region are semiconductors, such as silicon, germanium, and tellurium. Selenium has both a semiconducting grey allotrope and an insulating red allotrope; arsenic has a metallic grey allotrope, a semiconducting black allotrope, and an insulating yellow allotrope (though the last is unstable at ambient conditions). Again there are exceptions; for example, diamond has the highest thermal conductivity of all known materials, greater than any metal.

It is common to designate a class of metalloids straddling the boundary between metals and nonmetals, as elements in that region are intermediate in both physical and chemical properties. However, no consensus exists in the literature for precisely which elements should be so designated. When such a category is used, silicon, germanium, arsenic, and tellurium are almost always included, and boron and antimony usually are; but most sources include other elements as well, without agreement on which extra elements should be added, and some others subtract from this list instead. (Note: See lists of metalloids. For example, a periodic table used by the American Chemical Society includes polonium as a metalloid, but one used by the Royal Society of Chemistry does not, and that included in the Encyclopædia Britannica does not refer to metalloids or semi-metals at all. Classification can change even within a single work. For example, Sherwin and Weston's Chemistry of the Non-Metallic Elements (1966) has a periodic table on p. 7 classifying antimony as a nonmetal, but on p. 115 it is called a metal.) For example, unlike all the other elements generally considered metalloids or nonmetals, antimony's only stable form has metallic conductivity. Moreover, the element resembles bismuth and, more generally, the other p-block metals in its physical and chemical behaviour. On this basis some authors have argued that it is better classified as a metal than as a metalloid. On the other hand, selenium has some semiconducting properties in its most stable form (though it also has insulating allotropes) and it has been argued that it should be considered a metalloid – though this situation also holds for phosphorus, which is a much rarer inclusion among the metalloids.

=== Further manifestations of periodicity ===
There are some other relationships throughout the periodic table between elements that are not in the same group, such as the diagonal relationships between elements that are diagonally adjacent (e.g. lithium and magnesium). Some similarities can also be found between the main groups and the transition metal groups, or between the early actinides and early transition metals, when the elements have the same number of valence electrons. Thus uranium somewhat resembles chromium and tungsten in group 6, as all three have six valence electrons. Relationships between elements with the same number of valence electrons but different types of valence orbital have been called secondary or isodonor relationships: they usually have the same maximum oxidation states, but not the same minimum oxidation states. For example, chlorine and manganese both have +7 as their maximum oxidation state (e.g. Cl_{2}O_{7} and Mn_{2}O_{7}), but their respective minimum oxidation states are −1 (e.g. HCl) and −3 (K_{3}[Mn(CO)_{4}]). Elements with the same number of valence vacancies but different numbers of valence electrons are related by a tertiary or isoacceptor relationship: they usually have similar minimum but not maximum oxidation states. For example, hydrogen and chlorine both have −1 as their minimum oxidation state (in hydrides and chlorides), but hydrogen's maximum oxidation state is +1 (e.g. H_{2}O) while chlorine's is +7.

Many other physical properties of the elements exhibit periodic variation in accordance with the periodic law, such as melting points, boiling points, heats of fusion, heats of vaporization, atomisation energy, and so on. Similar periodic variations appear for the compounds of the elements, which can be observed by comparing hydrides, oxides, sulfides, halides, and so on. Chemical properties are more difficult to describe quantitatively, but likewise exhibit their own periodicities. Examples include the variation in the acidic and basic properties of the elements and their compounds, the stabilities of compounds, and methods of isolating the elements. Periodicity is and has been used very widely to predict the properties of unknown new elements and new compounds, and is central to modern chemistry.

== Classification of elements ==
A periodic table colour-coded to show some commonly used sets of similar elements. The categories and their boundaries differ somewhat between sources. Lutetium and lawrencium in group 3 are also transition metals.: Alkali metals Alkaline earth metals Lanthanides; Actinides; Transition metals / Other metals Metalloids; Other nonmetals Halogens; Noble gases

Many terms have been used in the literature to describe sets of elements that behave similarly. The group names alkali metal, alkaline earth metal, triel, tetrel, pnictogen, chalcogen, halogen, and noble gas are acknowledged by IUPAC; the other groups can be referred to by their number, or by their first element (e.g., group 6 is the chromium group). Some divide the p-block elements from groups 13 to 16 by metallicity, although there is neither an IUPAC definition nor a precise consensus on exactly which elements should be considered metals, nonmetals, or semi-metals (sometimes called metalloids). Neither is there a consensus on what the metals succeeding the transition metals ought to be called, with post-transition metal and poor metal being among the possibilities having been used. Some advanced monographs exclude the elements of group 12 from the transition metals on the grounds of their sometimes quite different chemical properties, but this is not a universal practice and IUPAC does not presently mention it as allowable in its Principles of Chemical Nomenclature.

The lanthanides are considered to be the elements La–Lu, which are all very similar to each other: historically they included only Ce–Lu, but lanthanum became included by common usage. The rare earth elements (or rare earth metals) add scandium and yttrium to the lanthanides. The actinides are considered to be the elements Ac–Lr (historically Th–Lr), although variation of properties in this set is much greater than within the lanthanides. IUPAC recommends the names lanthanoids and actinoids to avoid ambiguity, as the -ide suffix typically denotes a negative ion; however lanthanides and actinides remain common. With the increasing recognition of lutetium and lawrencium as d-block elements, some authors began to define the lanthanides as La–Yb and the actinides as Ac–No, matching the f-block. The transactinides or superheavy elements are the short-lived elements beyond the actinides, starting at lawrencium or rutherfordium (depending on where the actinides are taken to end).

Many more categorizations exist and are used according to certain disciplines. In astrophysics, a metal is defined as any element with atomic number greater than 2, i.e. anything except hydrogen and helium. The term "semimetal" has a different definition in physics than it does in chemistry: bismuth is a semimetal by physical definitions, but chemists generally consider it a metal. A few terms are widely used, but without any very formal definition, such as "heavy metal", which has been given such a wide range of definitions that it has been criticized as "effectively meaningless".

The scope of terms varies significantly between authors. For example, according to IUPAC, the noble gases extend to include the whole group, including the very radioactive superheavy element oganesson. However, among those who specialize in the superheavy elements, this is not often done: in this case "noble gas" is typically taken to imply the unreactive behaviour of the lighter elements of the group. Since calculations generally predict that oganesson should not be particularly inert due to relativistic effects, and may not even be a gas at room temperature if it could be produced in bulk, its status as a noble gas is often questioned in this context. Furthermore, national variations are sometimes encountered: in Japan, alkaline earth metals often do not include beryllium and magnesium as their behaviour is different from the heavier group 2 metals.

== History ==
=== Early history ===
In 1817, German physicist Johann Wolfgang Döbereiner began one of the earliest attempts to classify the elements. In 1829, he found that he could form some of the elements into groups of three, with the members of each group having related properties. He termed these groups triads. Chlorine, bromine, and iodine formed a triad; as did calcium, strontium, and barium; lithium, sodium, and potassium; and sulfur, selenium, and tellurium. Various chemists continued his work and were able to identify more and more relationships between small groups of elements. However, they could not build one scheme that encompassed them all.

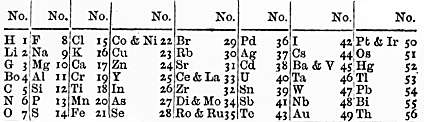
Newlands's table of the elements in 1866.

John Newlands published a letter in the Chemical News in February 1863 on the periodicity among the chemical elements. In 1864 Newlands published an article in the Chemical News showing that if the elements are arranged in the order of their atomic weights, those having consecutive numbers frequently either belong to the same group or occupy similar positions in different groups, and he pointed out that each eighth element starting from a given one is in this arrangement a kind of repetition of the first, like the eighth note of an octave in music (The Law of Octaves). However, Newlands's formulation only worked well for the main-group elements, and encountered serious problems with the others.

German chemist Lothar Meyer noted the sequences of similar chemical and physical properties repeated at periodic intervals. According to him, if the atomic weights were plotted as ordinates (i.e. vertically) and the atomic volumes as abscissas (i.e. horizontally)—the curve obtained a series of maximums and minimums—the most electropositive elements would appear at the peaks of the curve in the order of their atomic weights. In 1864, a book of his was published; it contained an early version of the periodic table containing 28 elements, and classified elements into six families by their valence—for the first time, elements had been grouped according to their valence. Works on organizing the elements by atomic weight had until then been stymied by inaccurate measurements of the atomic weights. In 1868, he revised his table, but this revision was published as a draft only after his death.

=== Mendeleev ===
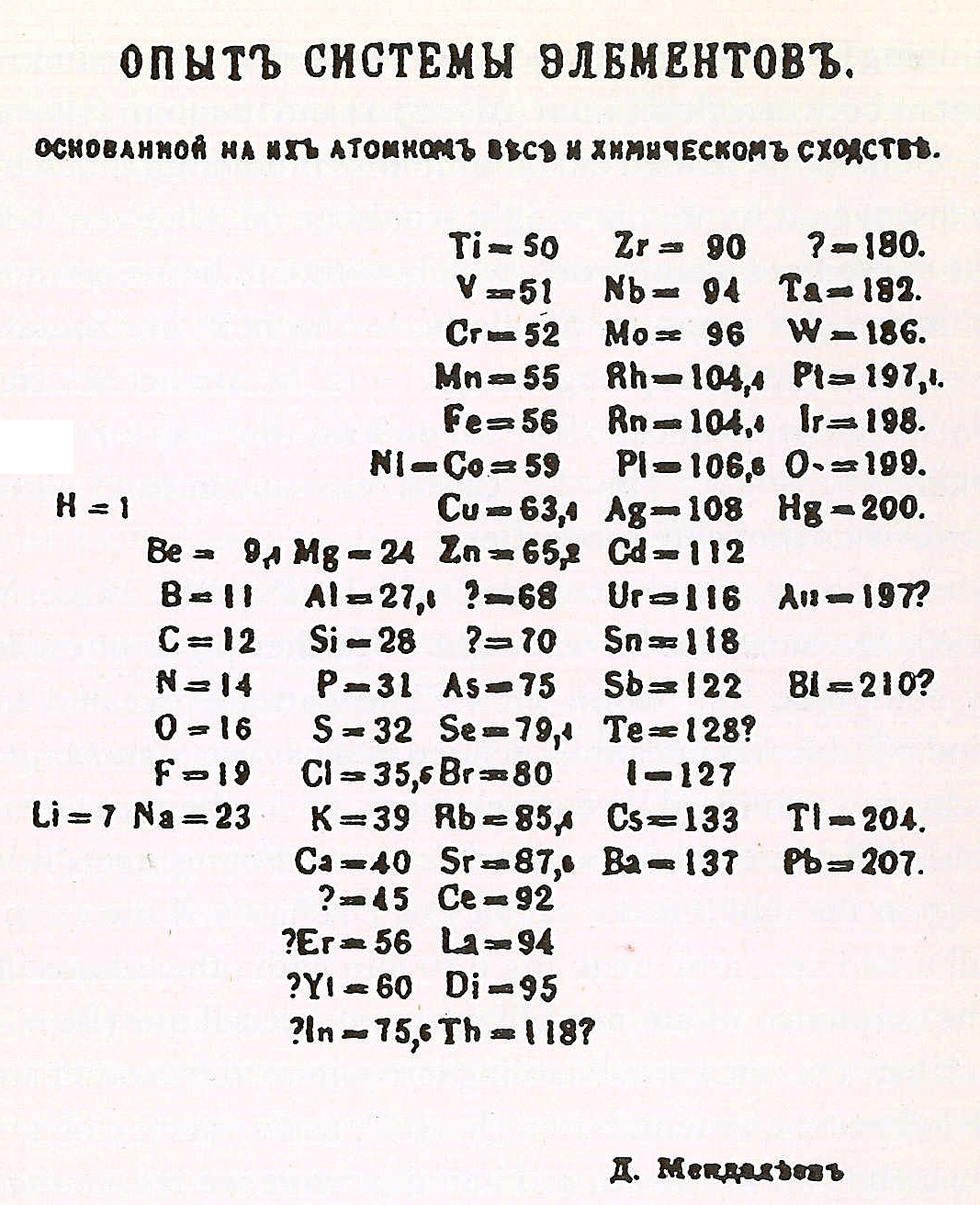
Mendeleev's 1869 periodic table

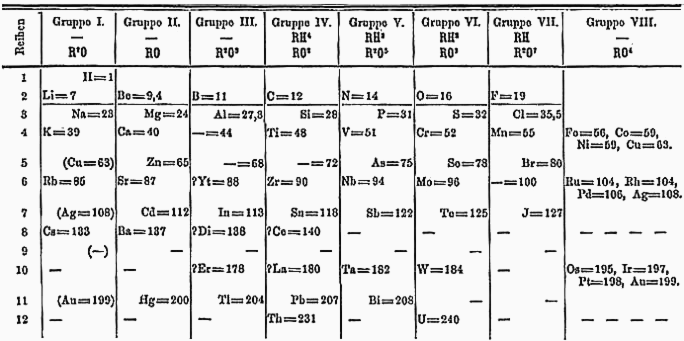
Mendeleev's 1871 periodic table

The definitive breakthrough came from the Russian chemist Dmitri Mendeleev. Although other chemists (including Meyer) had found some other versions of the periodic system at about the same time, Mendeleev was the most dedicated to developing and defending his system, and it was his system that most affected the scientific community. On 17 February 1869 (1 March 1869 in the Gregorian calendar), Mendeleev began arranging the elements and comparing them by their atomic weights. He began with a few elements, and over the course of the day his system grew until it encompassed most of the known elements. After he found a consistent arrangement, his printed table appeared in May 1869 in the journal of the Russian Chemical Society. When elements did not appear to fit in the system, he boldly predicted that either valencies or atomic weights had been measured incorrectly, or that there was a missing element yet to be discovered. In 1871, Mendeleev published a long article, including an updated form of his table, that made his predictions for unknown elements explicit. Mendeleev predicted the properties of three of these unknown elements in detail: then-missing heavier homologues of boron, aluminium, and silicon; he named them eka-boron, eka-aluminium, and eka-silicon ("eka" being Sanskrit for "one"). In 1875, the French chemist Paul-Émile Lecoq de Boisbaudran, working without knowledge of Mendeleev's prediction, discovered a new element in a sample of the mineral sphalerite, and named it gallium. He isolated the element and began determining its properties. Mendeleev, reading de Boisbaudran's publication, sent a letter claiming that gallium was his predicted eka-aluminium. Although Lecoq de Boisbaudran was initially sceptical, and suspected that Mendeleev was trying to take credit for his discovery, he later admitted that Mendeleev was correct. In 1879, the Swedish chemist Lars Fredrik Nilson discovered a new element, which he named scandium: it turned out to be eka-boron. Eka-silicon was found in 1886 by German chemist Clemens Winkler, who named it germanium. The properties of gallium, scandium, and germanium matched what Mendeleev had predicted. In 1889, Mendeleev noted at the Faraday Lecture to the Royal Institution in London that he had not expected to live long enough "to mention their discovery to the Chemical Society of Great Britain as a confirmation of the exactitude and generality of the periodic law". Even the discovery of the noble gases at the close of the 19th century, which Mendeleev had not predicted, fitted neatly into his scheme as an eighth main group.

Mendeleev nevertheless had some trouble fitting the known lanthanides into his scheme, as they did not exhibit the periodic change in valencies that the other elements did. After much investigation, the Czech chemist Bohuslav Brauner suggested in 1902 that the lanthanides could all be placed together in one group on the periodic table. He named this the "asteroid hypothesis" as an astronomical analogy: just as there is an asteroid belt instead of a single planet between Mars and Jupiter, so the place below yttrium was thought to be occupied by all the lanthanides instead of just one element.

=== Atomic number ===
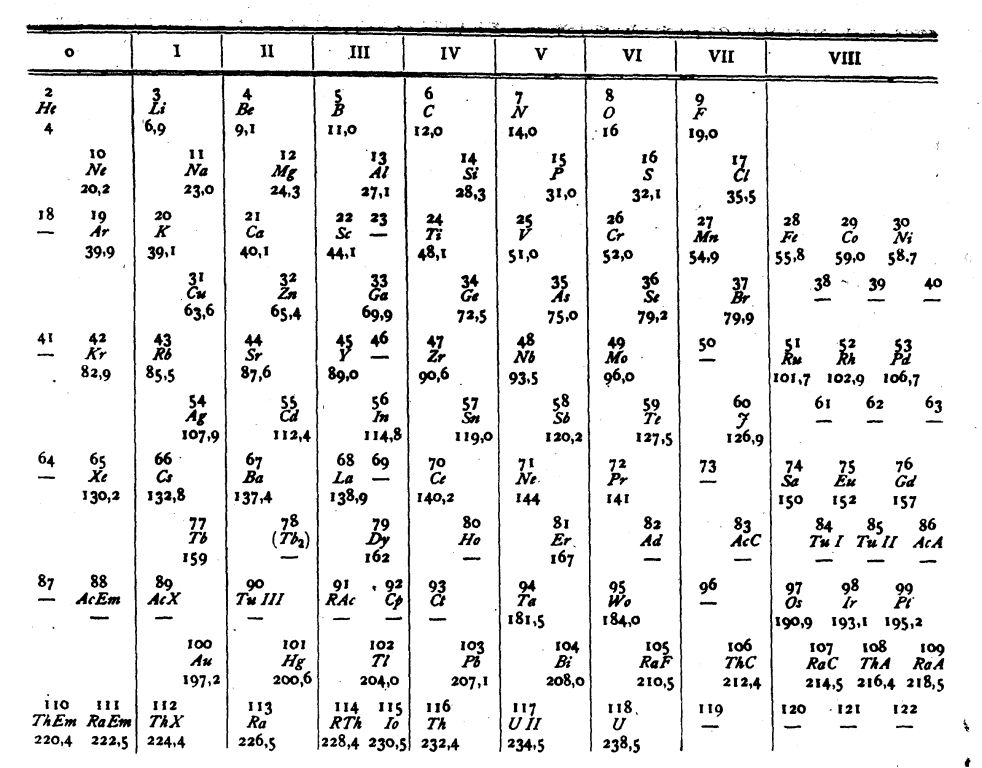
Periodic table of Antonius van den Broek

After the internal structure of the atom was probed, amateur Dutch physicist Antonius van den Broek proposed in 1913 that the nuclear charge determined the placement of elements in the periodic table. The New Zealand physicist Ernest Rutherford coined the word "atomic number" for this nuclear charge. In van den Broek's published article he illustrated the first electronic periodic table showing the elements arranged according to the number of their electrons. Rutherford confirmed in his 1914 paper that Bohr had accepted the view of van den Broek.

The same year, English physicist Henry Moseley using X-ray spectroscopy confirmed van den Broek's proposal experimentally. Moseley determined the value of the nuclear charge of each element from aluminium to gold and showed that Mendeleev's ordering actually places the elements in sequential order by nuclear charge. Nuclear charge is identical to proton count and determines the value of the atomic number (Z) of each element. Using atomic number gives a definitive, integer-based sequence for the elements. Moseley's research immediately resolved discrepancies between atomic weight and chemical properties; these were cases such as tellurium and iodine, where atomic number increases but atomic weight decreases. Although Moseley was soon killed in World War I, the Swedish physicist Manne Siegbahn continued his work up to uranium, and established that it was the element with the highest atomic number then known (92). Based on Moseley and Siegbahn's research, it was also known which atomic numbers corresponded to missing elements yet to be found: 43, 61, 72, 75, 85, and 87. (Element 75 had in fact already been found by Japanese chemist Masataka Ogawa in 1908 and named nipponium, but he mistakenly assigned it as element 43 instead of 75 and so his discovery was not generally recognized until later. The contemporarily accepted discovery of element 75 came in 1925, when Walter Noddack, Ida Tacke, and Otto Berg independently rediscovered it and gave it its present name, rhenium.)

The dawn of atomic physics also clarified the situation of isotopes. In the decay chains of the primordial radioactive elements thorium and uranium, it soon became evident that there were many apparent new elements that had different atomic weights but exactly the same chemical properties. In 1913, Frederick Soddy coined the term "isotope" to describe this situation, and considered isotopes to merely be different forms of the same chemical element. This furthermore clarified discrepancies such as tellurium and iodine: tellurium's natural isotopic composition is weighted towards heavier isotopes than iodine's, but tellurium has a lower atomic number.

=== Electron shells ===
The Danish physicist Niels Bohr applied Max Planck's idea of quantization to the atom. He concluded that the energy levels of electrons were quantised: only a discrete set of stable energy states were allowed. Bohr then attempted to understand periodicity through electron configurations, surmising in 1913 that the outer electrons should be responsible for the chemical properties of the element. In 1913, he produced the first electronic periodic table based on a quantum atom.

Bohr called his electron shells "rings" in 1913: atomic orbitals within shells did not exist at the time of his planetary model. Bohr explains in Part 3 of his famous 1913 paper that the maximum electrons in a shell is eight, writing, "We see, further, that a ring of n electrons cannot rotate in a single ring round a nucleus of charge ne unless n < 8." For smaller atoms, the electron shells would be filled as follows: "rings of electrons will only join if they contain equal numbers of electrons; and that accordingly the numbers of electrons on inner rings will only be 2, 4, 8." However, in larger atoms the innermost shell would contain eight electrons: "on the other hand, the periodic system of the elements strongly suggests that already in neon N = 10 an inner ring of eight electrons will occur." His proposed electron configurations for the atoms (shown to the right) mostly do not accord with those now known. They were improved further after the work of Arnold Sommerfeld and Edmund Stoner discovered more quantum numbers.

Bohr's electron configurations for light elements
Element	Electrons per shell
4	2,2
6	2,4
7	4,3
8	4,2,2
9	4,4,1
10	8,2
11	8,2,1
16	8,4,2,2
18	8,8,2

The first one to systematically expand and correct the chemical potentials of Bohr's atomic theory was Walther Kossel in 1914 and in 1916. Kossel explained that in the periodic table new elements would be created as electrons were added to the outer shell. In Kossel's paper, he writes:

This leads to the conclusion that the electrons, which are added further, should be put into concentric rings or shells, on each of which ... only a certain number of electrons—namely, eight in our case—should be arranged. As soon as one ring or shell is completed, a new one has to be started for the next element; the number of electrons, which are most easily accessible, and lie at the outermost periphery, increases again from element to element and, therefore, in the formation of each new shell the chemical periodicity is repeated.

In a 1919 paper, Irving Langmuir postulated the existence of "cells" which we now call orbitals, which could each only contain eight electrons each, and these were arranged in "equidistant layers" which we now call shells. He made an exception for the first shell to only contain two electrons. The chemist Charles Rugeley Bury suggested in 1921 that eight and eighteen electrons in a shell form stable configurations. Bury proposed that the electron configurations in transitional elements depended upon the valence electrons in their outer shell. He introduced the word transition to describe the elements now known as transition metals or transition elements. Bohr's theory was vindicated by the discovery of element 72: Georges Urbain claimed to have discovered it as the rare earth element celtium, but Bury and Bohr had predicted that element 72 could not be a rare earth element and had to be a homologue of zirconium. Dirk Coster and Georg von Hevesy searched for the element in zirconium ores and found element 72, which they named hafnium after Bohr's hometown of Copenhagen (Hafnia in Latin). Urbain's celtium proved to be simply purified lutetium (element 71). Hafnium and rhenium thus became the last stable elements to be discovered.

Prompted by Bohr, Wolfgang Pauli took up the problem of electron configurations in 1923. Pauli extended Bohr's scheme to use four quantum numbers, and formulated his exclusion principle which stated that no two electrons could have the same four quantum numbers. This explained the lengths of the periods in the periodic table (2, 8, 18, and 32), which corresponded to the number of electrons that each shell could occupy. In 1925, Friedrich Hund arrived at configurations close to the modern ones. As a result of these advances, periodicity became based on the number of chemically active or valence electrons rather than by the valences of the elements. The Aufbau principle that describes the electron configurations of the elements was first empirically observed by Erwin Madelung in 1926, though the first to publish it was Vladimir Karapetoff in 1930. In 1961, Vsevolod Klechkovsky derived the first part of the Madelung rule (that orbitals fill in order of increasing n + ℓ) from the Thomas–Fermi model; the complete rule was derived from a similar potential in 1971 by Yury N. Demkov and Valentin N. Ostrovsky. (Note: Demkov and Ostrovsky consider the potential $U_{1/2}(r) = -\frac{2v}{rR(r+R)^2}$ where $R$ and $v$ are constant parameters; this approaches a Coulomb potential for small $r$. When $v$ satisfies the condition $v=v_N=\frac{1}{4}R^2 N(N+1)$, where $N=n+l$, the zero-energy solutions to the Schrödinger equation for this potential can be described analytically with Gegenbauer polynomials. As $v$ passes through each of these values, a manifold containing all states with that value of $N$ arises at zero energy and then becomes bound, recovering the Madelung order. Perturbation-theory considerations show that states with smaller $n$ have lower energy, and that the s orbitals (with $l=0$) have their energies approaching the next $n+l$ group.)

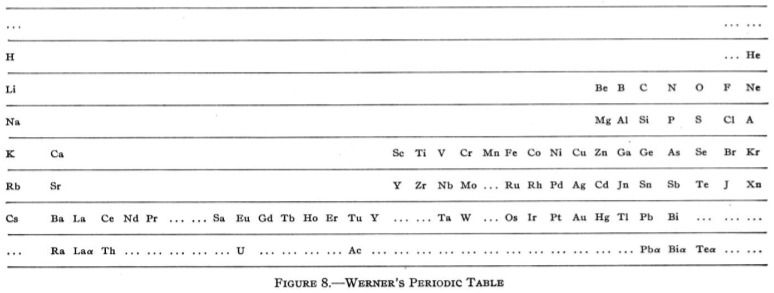
Periodic table of Alfred Werner (1905), the first appearance of the long form

The quantum theory clarified the transition metals and lanthanides as forming their own separate groups, transitional between the main groups, although some chemists had already proposed tables showing them this way before then: the English chemist Henry Bassett did so in 1892, the Danish chemist Julius Thomsen in 1895, and the Swiss chemist Alfred Werner in 1905. Bohr used Thomsen's form in his 1922 Nobel Lecture; Werner's form is very similar to the modern 32-column form. In particular, this supplanted Brauner's asteroidal hypothesis.

The exact position of the lanthanides, and thus the composition of group 3, remained under dispute for decades longer because their electron configurations were initially measured incorrectly. On chemical grounds Bassett, Werner, and Bury grouped scandium and yttrium with lutetium rather than lanthanum (the former two left an empty space below yttrium as lutetium had not yet been discovered). Hund assumed in 1927 that all the lanthanide atoms had configuration [Xe]4f^{0–14}5d^{1}6s^{2}, on account of their prevailing trivalency. It is now known that the relationship between chemistry and electron configuration is more complicated than that. (Note: For example, the early actinides continue to behave more like the d-block transition metals in their propensity towards high oxidation states all the way from actinium to uranium, even though it is actually only actinium and thorium that have d-block-like configurations in the gas phase; f-electrons appear already at protactinium. Uranium's actual configuration of [Rn]5f^{3}6d^{1}7s^{2} is in fact analogous to that Hund assumed for the lanthanides, but uranium does not favour the trivalent state, preferring to be tetravalent or hexavalent. On the other hand, lanthanide-like configurations for the actinides begin at plutonium, but the shift towards lanthanide-like behaviour is only clear at curium: the elements between uranium and curium form a transition from transition-metal-like behaviour to lanthanide-like behaviour. Thus chemical behaviour and electron configuration do not exactly match each other.) Early spectroscopic evidence seemed to confirm these configurations, and thus the periodic table was structured to have group 3 as scandium, yttrium, lanthanum, and actinium, with fourteen f-elements breaking up the d-block between lanthanum and hafnium. But it was later discovered that this is only true for four of the fifteen lanthanides (lanthanum, cerium, gadolinium, and lutetium), and that the other lanthanide atoms do not have a d-electron. In particular, ytterbium completes the 4f shell and thus Soviet physicists Lev Landau and Evgeny Lifshitz noted in 1948 that lutetium is correctly regarded as a d-block rather than an f-block element; that bulk lanthanum is an f-metal was first suggested by Jun Kondō in 1963, on the grounds of its low-temperature superconductivity. This clarified the importance of looking at low-lying excited states of atoms that can play a role in chemical environments when classifying elements by block and positioning them on the table. Many authors subsequently rediscovered this correction based on physical, chemical, and electronic concerns and applied it to all the relevant elements, thus making group 3 contain scandium, yttrium, lutetium, and lawrencium and having lanthanum through ytterbium and actinium through nobelium as the f-block rows: this corrected version achieves consistency with the Madelung rule and vindicates Bassett, Werner, and Bury's initial chemical placement.

In 1988, IUPAC released a report supporting this composition of group 3, a decision that was reaffirmed in 2021. Variation can still be found in textbooks on the composition of group 3, and some argumentation against this format is still published today, but chemists and physicists who have considered the matter largely agree on group 3 containing scandium, yttrium, lutetium, and lawrencium and challenge the counterarguments as being inconsistent.

=== Synthetic elements ===
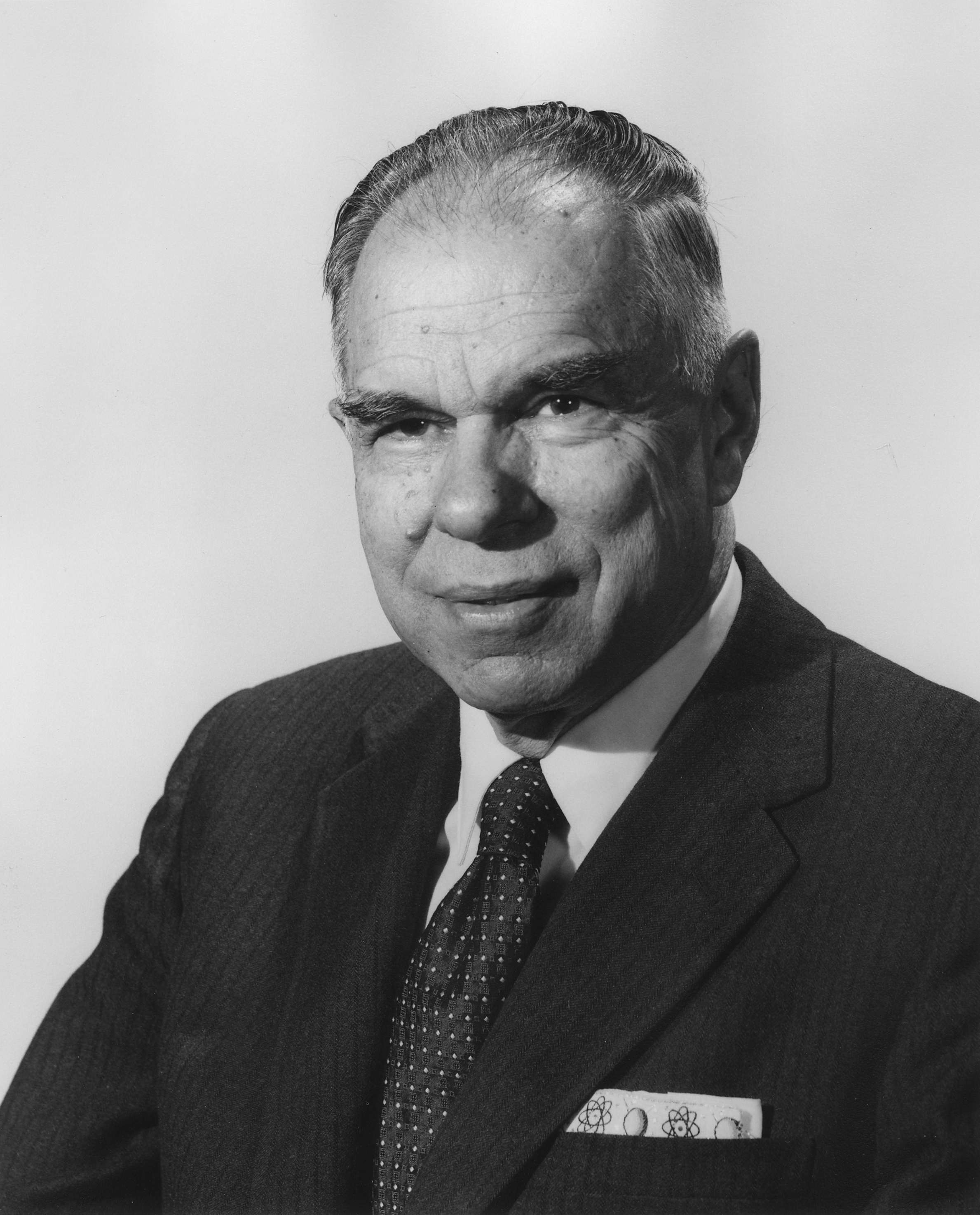
Glenn T. Seaborg

By 1936, the pool of missing elements from hydrogen to uranium had shrunk to four: elements 43, 61, 85, and 87 remained missing. Element 43 eventually became the first element to be synthesized artificially via nuclear reactions rather than discovered in nature. It was discovered in 1937 by Italian chemists Emilio Segrè and Carlo Perrier, who named their discovery technetium, after the Greek word for "artificial". Elements 61 (promethium) and 85 (astatine) were likewise produced artificially in 1945 and 1940 respectively; element 87 (francium) became the last element to be discovered in nature, by French chemist Marguerite Perey in 1939. (Note: Technetium, promethium, astatine, neptunium, and plutonium were eventually discovered to occur in nature as well, albeit in tiny traces. See timeline of chemical element discoveries.) The elements beyond uranium were likewise discovered artificially, starting with Edwin McMillan and Philip Abelson's 1940 discovery of neptunium (via bombardment of uranium with neutrons). Glenn T. Seaborg and his team at the Lawrence Berkeley National Laboratory (LBNL) continued discovering transuranium elements, starting with plutonium in 1941, and discovered that contrary to previous thinking, the elements from actinium onwards were congeners of the lanthanides rather than transition metals. Bassett (1892), Werner (1905), and the French engineer Charles Janet (1928) had previously suggested this, but their ideas did not then receive general acceptance. Seaborg thus called them the actinides. Elements up to 101 (named mendelevium in honour of Mendeleev) were synthesized up to 1955, either through neutron or alpha-particle irradiation, or in nuclear explosions in the cases of 99 (einsteinium) and 100 (fermium).

A significant controversy arose with elements 102 through 106 in the 1960s and 1970s, as competition arose between the LBNL team (now led by Albert Ghiorso) and a team of Soviet scientists at the Joint Institute for Nuclear Research (JINR) led by Georgy Flyorov. Each team claimed discovery, and in some cases each proposed their own name for the element, creating an element naming controversy that lasted decades. These elements were made by bombardment of actinides with light ions. IUPAC at first adopted a hands-off approach, preferring to wait and see if a consensus would be forthcoming. But as it was also the height of the Cold War, it became clear that this would not happen. As such, IUPAC and the International Union of Pure and Applied Physics (IUPAP) created a Transfermium Working Group (TWG, fermium being element 100) in 1985 to set out criteria for discovery, which were published in 1991. After some further controversy, these elements received their final names in 1997, including seaborgium (106) in honour of Seaborg.

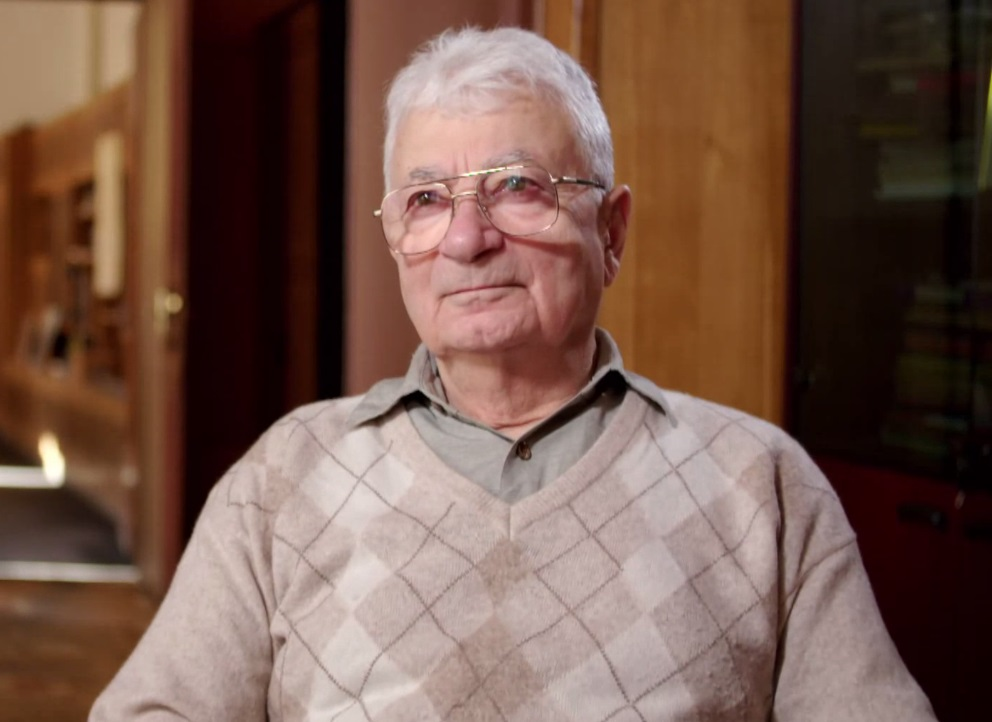
Yuri Oganessian

The TWG's criteria were used to arbitrate later element discovery claims from LBNL and JINR, as well as from research institutes in Germany (GSI) and Japan (Riken). Currently, consideration of discovery claims is performed by a IUPAC/IUPAP Joint Working Party. After priority was assigned, the elements were officially added to the periodic table, and the discoverers were invited to propose their names. By 2016, this had occurred for all elements up to 118, therefore completing the periodic table's first seven rows. The discoveries of elements beyond 106 were made possible by techniques devised by Yuri Oganessian at the JINR: cold fusion (bombardment of lead and bismuth by heavy ions) made possible the 1981–2004 discoveries of elements 107 through 112 at GSI and 113 at Riken, and he led the JINR team (in collaboration with American scientists) to discover elements 114 through 118 using hot fusion (bombardment of actinides by calcium ions) in 1998–2010. The heaviest known element, oganesson (118), is named in Oganessian's honour. Element 114 is named flerovium in honour of his predecessor and mentor Flyorov.

In celebration of the periodic table's 150th anniversary, the United Nations declared the year 2019 as the International Year of the Periodic Table, celebrating "one of the most significant achievements in science". The discovery criteria set down by the TWG were updated in 2020 in response to experimental and theoretical progress that had not been foreseen in 1991. Today, the periodic table is among the most recognisable icons of chemistry. IUPAC is involved today with many processes relating to the periodic table: the recognition and naming of new elements, recommending group numbers and collective names, and the updating of atomic weights.

== Future extension beyond the seventh period ==
Energy eigenvalues (in eV) for the outermost electrons of elements with Z = 100 through 172, predicted using Dirac–Fock calculations. The − and + signs refer to orbitals with decreased or increased azimuthal quantum number from spin–orbit splitting respectively: p− is p_{1/2}, p+ is p_{3/2}, d− is d_{3/2}, d+ is d_{5/2}, f− is f_{5/2}, f+ is f_{7/2}, g− is g_{7/2}, and g+ is g_{9/2}. The spacing of energy levels up to Z = 120 is normal, and becomes normal again at Z = 157; between them, a very different situation is observed.

The most recently named elements – nihonium (113), moscovium (115), tennessine (117), and oganesson (118) – completed the seventh row of the periodic table. Future elements would have to begin an eighth row. These elements may be referred to either by their atomic numbers (e.g. "element 164"), or by the IUPAC systematic element names adopted in 1978, which directly relate to the atomic numbers (e.g. "unhexquadium" for element 164, derived from Latin unus "one", Greek hexa "six", Latin quadra "four", and the traditional -ium suffix for metallic elements). All attempts to synthesize such elements have failed so far. Attempts to make element 119 have been ongoing since 2018 at the Riken research institute in Japan and since 2026 at the JINR in Russia, and an attempt to make element 120 has been ongoing since 2025 at the LBNL in the United States. The Heavy Ion Research Facility in Lanzhou (HIRFL) in China also plans to make its own attempts at synthesizing the first few period 8 elements.

If the eighth period followed the pattern set by the earlier periods, then it would contain fifty elements, filling the 8s, 5g, 6f, 7d, and finally 8p subshells in that order. But by this point, relativistic effects should result in significant deviations from the Madelung rule. Various different models have been suggested for the configurations of eighth-period elements, as well as how to show the results in a periodic table. All agree that the eighth period should begin like the previous ones with two 8s elements, 119 and 120. However, after that the massive energetic overlaps between the 5g, 6f, 7d, and 8p subshells means that they all begin to fill together, and it is not clear how to separate out specific 5g and 6f series. Elements 121 through 156 thus do not fit well as chemical analogues of any previous group in the earlier parts of the table, although they have sometimes been placed as 5g, 6f, and other series to formally reflect their electron configurations. Eric Scerri has raised the question of whether an extended periodic table should take into account the failure of the Madelung rule in this region, or if such exceptions should be ignored. The shell structure may also be fairly formal at this point: already the electron distribution in an oganesson atom is expected to be rather uniform, with no discernible shell structure.

The situation from elements 157 to 172 should return to normalcy and be more reminiscent of the earlier rows. The heavy p-shells are split by the spin–orbit interaction: one p orbital (p_{1/2}) is more stabilized, and the other two (p_{3/2}) are destabilized. (Such shifts in the quantum numbers happen for all types of shells, but it makes the biggest difference to the order for the p-shells.) It is likely that by element 157, the filled 8s and 8p_{1/2} shells with four electrons in total have sunk into the core. Beyond the core, the next orbitals are 7d and 9s at similar energies, followed by 9p_{1/2} and 8p_{3/2} at similar energies, and then a large gap. Thus, the 9s and 9p_{1/2} orbitals in essence replace the 8s and 8p_{1/2} ones, making elements 157–172 probably chemically analogous to groups 3–18: for example, element 164 would appear two places below lead in group 14 under the usual pattern, but is calculated to be very analogous to palladium in group 10 instead. Thus, it takes fifty-four elements rather than fifty to reach the next noble element after 118. However, while these conclusions about elements 157 through 172's chemistry are generally agreed by models, there is disagreement on whether the periodic table should be drawn to reflect chemical analogies, or if it should reflect likely formal electron configurations, which should be quite different from earlier periods and are not agreed between sources. Discussion about the format of the eighth row thus continues.

Beyond element 172, calculation is complicated by the 1s electron energy level becoming imaginary. Such a situation does have a physical interpretation and does not in itself pose an electronic limit to the periodic table, but the correct way to incorporate such states into multi-electron calculations is still an open question, which would need to be answered to calculate the periodic table's structure beyond this point.

Nuclear stability will likely prove a decisive factor constraining the number of possible elements. It depends on the balance between the electric repulsion between protons and the strong force binding protons and neutrons together. Protons and neutrons are arranged in shells, just like electrons, and so a closed shell can significantly increase stability: the known superheavy nuclei exist because of such a shell closure, probably at around 114–126 protons and 184 neutrons. They are probably close to a predicted island of stability, where superheavy nuclides should be more long-lived than otherwise expected: predictions for the longest-lived nuclides on the island range from microseconds to millions of years. It should nonetheless be noted that these are essentially extrapolations into an unknown part of the chart of nuclides, and systematic model uncertainties need to be taken into account.

As the closed shells are passed, the stabilizing effect should vanish. Thus, superheavy nuclides with more than 184 neutrons are expected to have much shorter lifetimes, spontaneously fissioning within 10^{−15} seconds. If this is so, then it would not make sense to consider them chemical elements: IUPAC/IUPAP theorizes and recommends an element to exist only if the nucleus lives longer than 10^{−14} seconds, the time needed for it to gather an electron cloud. Nonetheless, theoretical estimates of half-lives are very model-dependent, ranging over many orders of magnitude. The extreme repulsion between protons is predicted to result in exotic nuclear topologies, with bubbles, rings, and tori expected: this further complicates extrapolation. It is not clear if any further-out shell closures exist, due to an expected smearing out of distinct nuclear shells (as is already expected for the electron shells at oganesson). Furthermore, even if later shell closures exist, it is not clear if they would allow such heavy elements to exist. As such, it may be that the periodic table practically ends around element 120, as elements become too short-lived to observe, and then too short-lived to have chemistry; the era of discovering new elements would thus be close to its end. If another proton shell closure beyond 126 does exist, then it probably occurs around 164; thus the region where periodicity fails more or less matches the region of instability between the shell closures.

Alternatively, quark matter may become stable at high mass numbers, in which the nucleus is composed of freely flowing up and down quarks instead of binding them into protons and neutrons; this would create a continent of stability instead of an island. Other effects may come into play: for example, in very heavy elements the 1s electrons are likely to spend a significant amount of time so close to the nucleus that they are actually inside it, which would make them vulnerable to electron capture.

Even if eighth-row elements can exist, producing them is likely to be difficult, and it should become even more difficult as atomic number rises. Although the 8s elements 119 and 120 are expected to be reachable with present means, the elements beyond that are expected to require new technology, if they can be produced at all.

== Alternative periodic tables ==
Otto Theodor Benfey's spiral periodic table (1964)

The periodic law may be represented in multiple ways, of which the standard periodic table is only one. Within 100 years of the appearance of Mendeleev's table in 1869, Edward G. Mazurs had collected an estimated 700 different published versions of the periodic table. Many forms retain the rectangular structure, including Charles Janet's left-step periodic table (pictured below), and the modernised form of Mendeleev's original 8-column layout that is still common in Russia. Other periodic table formats have been shaped much more exotically, such as spirals (Otto Theodor Benfey's pictured to the right), circles and triangles.

Alternative periodic tables are often developed to highlight or emphasize chemical or physical properties of the elements that are not as apparent in traditional periodic tables, with different ones skewed more towards emphasizing chemistry or physics at either end. The many different forms of the periodic table have prompted the questions of whether there is an optimal or definitive form of the periodic table, and if so, what it might be. There are no current consensus answers to either question. Janet's left-step table is being increasingly discussed as a candidate for being the optimal or most fundamental form; Scerri has written in support of it, as it clarifies helium's nature as an s-block element, increases regularity by having all period lengths repeated, faithfully follows Madelung's rule by making each period correspond to one value of n + ℓ, and regularises atomic number triads and the first-row anomaly trend.

Left-step periodic table (by Charles Janet)

	f^{1}	f^{2}	f^{3}	f^{4}	f^{5}	f^{6}	f^{7}	f^{8}	f^{9}	f^{10}	f^{11}	f^{12}	f^{13}	f^{14}	d^{1}	d^{2}	d^{3}	d^{4}	d^{5}	d^{6}	d^{7}	d^{8}	d^{9}	d^{10}	p^{1}	p^{2}	p^{3}	p^{4}	p^{5}	p^{6}	s^{1}	s^{2}
1s																															H	He
2s																															Li	Be
2p 3s																									B	C	N	O	F	Ne	Na	Mg
3p 4s																									Al	Si	P	S	Cl	Ar	K	Ca
3d 4p 5s															Sc	Ti	V	Cr	Mn	Fe	Co	Ni	Cu	Zn	Ga	Ge	As	Se	Br	Kr	Rb	Sr
4d 5p 6s															Y	Zr	Nb	Mo	Tc	Ru	Rh	Pd	Ag	Cd	In	Sn	Sb	Te	I	Xe	Cs	Ba
4f 5d 6p 7s	La	Ce	Pr	Nd	Pm	Sm	Eu	Gd	Tb	Dy	Ho	Er	Tm	Yb	Lu	Hf	Ta	W	Re	Os	Ir	Pt	Au	Hg	Tl	Pb	Bi	Po	At	Rn	Fr	Ra
5f 6d 7p 8s	Ac	Th	Pa	U	Np	Pu	Am	Cm	Bk	Cf	Es	Fm	Md	No	Lr	Rf	Db	Sg	Bh	Hs	Mt	Ds	Rg	Cn	Nh	Fl	Mc	Lv	Ts	Og	Uue	Ubn
	f-block														d-block										p-block						s-block

This form of periodic table is congruent with the order in which electron shells are ideally filled according to the Madelung rule, as shown in the accompanying sequence in the left margin (read from top to bottom, left to right). The experimentally determined ground-state electron configurations of the elements differ from the configurations predicted by the Madelung rule in twenty instances, but the Madelung-predicted configurations are always at least close to the ground state. The last two elements shown, elements 119 and 120, have not yet been synthesized.

== See also ==
- Nucleosynthesis – Process of creating new atomic nuclei from existing nucleons
- Periodic systems of small molecules – Charts of molecules

== Bibliography ==
- Greenwood, Norman N.; Earnshaw, Alan (1997). Chemistry of the Elements (2nd ed.). Butterworth-Heinemann. doi:10.1016/C2009-0-30414-6. ISBN 978-0-08-037941-8.
- Petrucci, Ralph H.; Harwood, William S.; Herring, F. Geoffrey (2002). General Chemistry: Principles and Modern Applications (8th ed.). Upper Saddle River, N.J.: Prentice Hall. ISBN 978-0-13-014329-7. LCCN 2001032331. OCLC 46872308.
- Scerri, Eric R. (2020). The Periodic Table, Its Story and Its Significance (2nd ed.). New York: Oxford University Press. ISBN 978-0-19-091436-3.
- Siekierski, S.; Burgess, J. (2002). Concise Chemistry of the Elements. Horwood. ISBN 978-1-898563-71-6.
- Wulfsberg, Gary (2000). Inorganic Chemistry. University Science Books. ISBN 978-1-891389-01-6.
