= Names for sets of chemical elements =

Group of chemical elements

There are currently 118 known chemical elements with a wide range of physical and chemical properties. Amongst this diversity, scientists have found it useful to apply names for various sets of elements that have similar properties, to varying degrees. Many of these sets are formally recognized by the standards body IUPAC.

== IUPAC ==
The following collective names are recommended or noted by IUPAC:

Alkali metals	The metals of group 1: Li, Na, K, Rb, Cs, Fr
Alkaline earth metals	The metals of group 2: Be, Mg, Ca, Sr, Ba, Ra
Transition elements *	Elements in groups 3 to 11 or 3 to 12 (the latter making up the d-block)
Pnictogens	The elements of group 15: N, P, As, Sb, Bi †
Chalcogens	The elements of group 16: O, S, Se, Te, Po †
Halogens	The elements of group 17: F, Cl, Br, I, At †
Noble gases	The elements of group 18: He, Ne, Ar, Kr, Xe, Rn †
Lanthanoids ‡	Elements 57–71: La, Ce, Pr, Nd, Pm, Sm, Eu, Gd, Tb, Dy, Ho, Er, Tm, Yb, Lu
Actinoids ‡	Elements 89–103: Ac, Th, Pa, U, Np, Pu, Am, Cm, Bk, Cf, Es, Fm, Md, No, Lr
Rare-earth metals	Sc, Y, plus the lanthanides
Inner transition elements	f-block elements
Main group elements	Elements in groups 1–2 or 13–18, excluding hydrogen

* Transition elements are sometimes referred to as transition metals
† Although the heavier elements of groups 15 (Mc), 16 (Lv), 17 (Ts) and 18 (Og) have been notionally assigned to the indicated groups their chemical properties have not yet been experimentally confirmed.
‡ Lanthanoids and actinoids are sometimes referred to as lanthanides and actinides respectively

== Metallicity-based ==
Another common classification is by degree of metallic or nonmetallic behaviour and characteristics. Elements in the vicinity of where the metals and nonmetals meet are sometime classified as metalloids or an equivalent term. These two to three classes are commonly marked by differing background colors in the periodic table.

== Common and historical ==
Many other names for sets of elements are in common use; others have been used throughout history. These sets usually do not aim to cover the whole periodic table (as for example period does), and often overlap or have boundaries that differ between authors. Some examples:

- Metals and nonmetals
- Metalloids – Variously-defined group of elements with properties intermediate between metals and nonmetals.

In alphabetic order:

- Coinage metals – Various metals used to mint coins, primarily the group 11 elements Cu, Ag, and Au.
- Earth metal – Old historic term, usually referred to the metals of groups 3 and 13, although sometimes others such as beryllium and chromium are included as well.
- Heavy metals – Variously-defined group of metals, on the base of their density, atomic number, or toxicity.
- Heavy atom – term used in computational chemistry to refer to any element other than hydrogen and helium.
- Minor actinides – Actinides found in significant quantities in nuclear fuel, other than U and Pu: Np, Am, Cm.
- Native metals – Metals that occur pure in nature, including the noble metals and others such as Sn and Pb.
- Noble metals – Variously-defined group of metals that are generally resistant to corrosion. Usually includes Ag, Au, and the platinum-group metals.
- Non-ferrous metals - Metals or alloys that do not contain iron in appreciable amounts.
- Platinum group – Ru, Rh, Pd, Os, Ir, Pt.
- Post-transition metals – The metals coming after the transition metals. Many other names have been used for this set, and its borders are not agreed on.
- Precious metals – Variously-defined group of non-radioactive metals of high economical value.
- Superactinides – Hypothetical series of elements 121 to 157, which includes a predicted "g-block" of the periodic table.
- Transactinide elements – Elements after the actinides (atomic number greater than 103).
- Transplutonium elements – Elements with atomic number greater than 94.
- Transuranium elements – Elements with atomic number greater than 92.
- Valve metal - a metal which, in an electrolytic cell, passes current in only one direction.
