= Kristy Turner =

British chemist, lecturer

- Born: Kristy Turner
- Education: University of Glasgow (PhD)
- Known for: Chemical education Curriculum development
- Awards: School Education Award (2017)
- Scientific career
- Fields: Chemistry education
- Workplaces: The University of Manchester
- Thesis: Solid-phase approaches to heterocycles using a sulfur linker cleaved by reduction with samarium (II) iodide (2006)
- Doctoral advisor: Prof. David J. Procter
- Website: dockristy.wordpress.com/about/

Kristy micheal Turner is a British chemist, lecturer in the Department of Chemistry at the University of Manchester and a chemistry teacher at Bolton School, Manchester. Her research is based on the field of chemical education, science communication, development of the chemistry curriculum and assessment, and also in engagement of STEM subjects within school students. She is the current chair of the Education in Chemistry magazine editorial board at the Royal Society of Chemistry.

== Education ==
Kristy read her Doctor of Philosophy degree with Prof. David J. Procter on Solid-phase approaches to heterocycles using a sulfur linker cleaved by reduction with samarium (II) iodide at University of Glasgow and successfully gained her PhD in 2006.

== Research and career ==
Upon completion of her PhD, she joined the Royal Society of Chemistry trainee teacher program (Chemistry for Our Future initiative) in 2006, and since then has been a RSC school teacher fellow. She worked as a chemistry teacher at Westhoughton High School from 2006 to 2011, where she also was the Head of Chemistry from 2008 to 2011. She then moved to Bolton School in 2012, where she currently works as a chemistry teacher to date. In 2011, she also joined the University of Manchester as a RSC School teacher fellow. In 2012, she was promoted to Honorary fellow and is currently working as a school teacher fellow in chemical education and transition from the year 2015 on wards.

Turner is the current chair of the Education in Chemistry magazine editorial board at the Royal Society of Chemistry. She is also a member of the committee board at RSC in Curriculum and Assessment development for age groups 11 – 16 and 11 – 19.

=== Notable work ===
Turner is the author of one of the popular RSC resource, Starters for ten. She also have published a variety of articles in both Chemistry World and Education in Chemistry including in chemistry assessment, organic chemistry, and relationships within a research group.

Turner has also appeared in a variety of television shows. The table below summarizes her work in the television media;

Program	Original Network	Role	Comments
Back in Time for School	BBC Two	Teacher	Historical documentary series. Contributor 6/8 episodes starring as a teacher in the time travelling experiment experiencing school from 1895 to 1999 and the present day.
Slime: Can it be environmentally friendly?	CBBC	Presenter	Appears in video; Find out how to make eco-friendly slime at home
Cool facts about the periodic table	CBBC	Presenter	Newsround (CBBC) Special for celebration of the International Year of the Periodic Table
What is the periodic table?	CBBC	Presenter	Newsround (CBBC) Special for celebration of the International Year of the Periodic Table

=== Awards and nominations ===
- School Education Award (2017)
