= Otto Theodor Benfey =

German-born American chemist and historian of science (1925–2024)

- Born: 31 October 1925; Berlin, Germany
- Died: 24 January 2024 (aged 98); Greensboro, North Carolina, U.S.
- Education: University College London
- Spouse: Rachel (Thomas) Benfey
- Children: Christopher Benfey, Philip Benfey
- Awards: HIST Award, ACS, 2019
- Scientific career
- Fields: Chemical education and the history of chemistry
- Workplaces: Haverford College, Earlham College, Guilford College
- Doctoral advisor: Christopher Kelk Ingold

Otto Theodor Benfey (31 October 1925 – 24 January 2024) was a German-born American chemist and historian of science. Sent to England to escape Nazi Germany at age 10, he completed his education as a chemist at University College London before moving to the United States. A Quaker and a pacifist, Benfey taught at Haverford College, Earlham College, and Guilford College, retiring in 1988 as the Dana Professor of Chemistry and History of Science, Emeritus.

Benfey is known for his work on chemical education and the history of science. He edited the ACS-sponsored high school magazine Chemistry for fifteen years. His translations include The Japanese and Western Science by Masao Watanabe, The History of the International Chemical Industry by Fred Aftalion, and My 132 Semesters of Chemistry Studies by Vladimir Prelog. His books include From vital force to structural formulas (1964), Introduction to Organic Reaction Mechanisms (1970), and Robert Burns Woodward. Architect and Artist in the World of Molecules (2001).

== Childhood ==
Otto Theodor Benfey was born on 31 October 1925, to Eduard Benfey and his second wife, Lotte Maria (Fleischmann) Benfey, in Berlin, Germany. Eduard Benfey, a graduate of the University of Göttingen, had served as Chief Justice of the Supreme Court of Economic Arbitration during the Weimar Republic. Although his parents had converted to Lutheranism, the family was still regarded as Jewish by the increasingly powerful Nazi Party. In 1936, Ted Benfey was sent to live in England with family friends, the Mendls. He attended the Watford Grammar School with their son, Wolf Mendl. Ted Benfey and Wolf Mendl were both confirmed in the Church of England, but eventually both they and Mrs. Mendl joined the Society of Friends, or Quakers.

Following Kristallnacht in 1938, Benfey's younger brother and older sister joined him briefly in England. Eduard and Lotte Benfey were eventually successful in getting American visas, because Lotte's sister Anni Albers and her husband Josef Albers were Bauhaus artists, teaching at Black Mountain College in North Carolina. While the rest of the family were reunited as immigrants in New York, the Mendls invited Ted to remain with them and complete his education.

== University education ==
Benfey's interests in organic chemistry and geometry led him to apply to study chemistry at university, and he was accepted at University College London. During World War II, the chemistry department was relocated to Aberystwyth, Wales. Beginning in 1942, Benfey lived there in a cooperative student hostel. One of his close friends was Nigerian Stephen Oluwole Awokoya. In 1944, Benfey took his examinations, and was awarded his B.Sc. degree with first class honors in 1945.

Soon after, University College London moved back to London. London was still under attack from V-1 and V-2 rockets. Benfey was invited to continue his studies and do Ph.D. work with Christopher Kelk Ingold. As a Quaker, he could not agree to work on anything relating to weapons development. Ingold assigned him to work on aliphatic substitution and evidence for carbocation. Benfey received his Doctor of Philosophy from University College, London in 1947.

During his Ph.D. work, Benfey studied the effects of salts on alkyl halide hydrolysis reaction rates. He showed that "two salts could have inverse effects depending on the leaving group of the alkyl halide," the opposite of a prediction made by Louis Plack Hammett. On the basis of this work, Benfey obtained a London University postdoctoral traveling fellowship, enabling him to work with Hammett at Columbia University.

== Career ==
=== Haverford College ===
Although he had fully intended to return to England, Benfey was approached by Haverford College, a Quaker institution, and invited to join the chemistry faculty. He accepted, becoming one of four members of the department in January 1948. Soon after, he met Rachel Thomas, a teacher at Haverford Friends School and an artist. Rachel's fiancé, Sergei Thomas, had died in an accident a few months earlier. She and Ted Benfey were married in 1949. Also in 1949, Benfey attended the first meeting of the Society for Social Responsibility in Science (SSRS) at Haverford, organized by Victor Paschkis. Benfey became its second president in 1951.

During his time at Haverford, several people influenced Benfey and shaped his career as a historian of science. One was William Buell Meldrum, the department head at Haverford when Benfey joined the faculty. Like Christopher Kelk Ingold, Meldrum approached the teaching of chemistry from a historical and philosophical viewpoint, a model which Benfey followed. Another influence was James B. Conant of Harvard University. Benfey attended a summer school in which Conant focused on case histories in experimental science. Henry Margenau, a visiting professor from Yale University, recruited Benfey to translate Ernst Cassirer's Determinismus und Indeterminismus in der modernen Physik into English. It became the first of many Benfey translations.

Benfey chose to resign from Haverford as his sabbatical year approached. He spent his sabbatical year working with Frank Westheimer of Harvard University. He also prepared the manuscript for From vital force to structural formulas (1964). It became the first book in the Houghton Mifflin series Classic Researches in Organic Chemistry.

=== Earlham College ===
In the fall of 1955, Benfey was approached by Larry Strong at Earlham College, who invited him to become the third member of the chemistry department, with Strong and Wilmer Stratton. Benfey and Strong began to develop a new curriculum based on concepts. In 1958, their new curriculum was published in the report of the Advisory Council on College Chemistry. After graduating three National Science Foundation Fellowship awardees in its first group of students, the American Chemical Society's Committee on Professional Training (CPT) approved the Earlham curriculum, and accepted it as a model for "curricular innovation". The work at Earlham also led to development of a United States high school curriculum for chemistry, The Chemical Bond Approach, which received international attention.

In 1963, Benfey was invited by the American Chemical Society to become the editor of Chemistry magazine, for high school students. From January 1964 to 1978, Benfey edited a highly respected magazine. He increased its publication five-fold, reaching as many as 30,000 students and teachers. The magazine acted as a model for similar publications internationally.

Final shape of the periodic 'snail'

One of the Benfey's publications in Chemistry was a model of an extended periodic table, sometimes referred to as the periodic snail. First published in 1964, it explicitly showed the location of lanthanides and actinides. The elements form a two-dimensional spiral, starting from hydrogen, and folding their way around two peninsulars, the transition metals, and lanthanides and actinides. A superactinide island is already slotted in.

Benfey was active in the Division of History of Chemistry (HIST) of the American Chemical Society, serving as chair of the division in 1966. Benfey continued to publish articles and books on the history of chemistry, writing about scientists such as Archibald Scott Couper, Lothar Meyer, Jacobus Henricus van 't Hoff, and Alexander William Williamson. He wrote Names and Structures of Organic Molecules (Wiley, 1966) and Introduction to Organic Reaction Mechanisms, the first in the Interface series of books by the NSF's Advisory Council on College Chemistry (McGraw-Hill, 1970).

=== Guilford College ===
In 1970, Benfey and his family spent a year at Kwansei Gakuin University in Nishinomiya, Japan enabling him to deepen his interest in the history of science in the Far East. Benfey studied the use of regular solid geometry in Japan, relating geometry, chemical structure, and origami techniques. He also worked on translating an account of the history of Chinese science by Yabuuchi Kiyoshi.

After their return, the Benfeys were approached by Grirnsley Hobbs, who eventually convinced them to move to Guilford College in North Carolina in 1973. Benfey recruited David MacInnes and they began teaching continuing education courses on basic chemistry in the evening, targeting nearby Ciba-Geigy employees. Benfey also taught history of science courses that met the science requirement for non-science majors. His students included Frances Moore Lappé, David Rhees of the Bakken Museum, and William R. Newman. He taught interdisciplinary classes with a variety of colleagues.

Benfey formally retired from Guilford College in 1988, as the Dana Professor of Chemistry and History of Science, Emeritus.

=== Retirement ===
After moving to Philadelphia in 1989, Benfey became an adjunct professor in History and Sociology of Science at the University of Pennsylvania. He also became the editor of the Bulletin for the History of Chemistry (1988-1995) of the Beckman Center for the History of Chemistry (later the Chemical Heritage Magazine of the Chemical Heritage Foundation). He served on advisory boards for The Scientist magazine (1986-1996), The Chemical Sciences in Society (1989-1998) and Foundations of Chemistry (1998- ).

Benfey continued to write, translate and publish. His translations include The Japanese and Western Science by Masao Watanabe (from German to English, originally in Japanese), The History of the International Chemical Industry by Fred Aftalion (from French to English), and Vladimir Prelog's autobiography My 132 Semesters of Chemistry Studies (German to English). Benfey wrote about a number of scientists, particularly Carl Schorlemmer, August Wilhelm von Hofmann, and Robert Burns Woodward.

In 1996, the Benfeys moved to the Friends Homes at Guilford, a Quaker retirement community. Benfey published Robert Burns Woodward. Architect and Artist in the World of Molecules with co-editor Peter Morris in 2001. He continued to serve as editor at large of the Chemical Heritage Magazine until 2014. He gathered and published four volumes of The Experience of War: Residents of Friends Homes Tell Their Stories (2009, 2010, 2012, 2014).

Rachel Benfey survived a stroke in 2005, and died on 22 September 2013. Otto Theodor Benfey died at a care home in Greensboro, North Carolina, on 24 January 2024, at the age of 98.

== Awards and honors ==
- 2019, HIST Award for Outstanding Achievement in the History of Chemistry, Division of the History of Chemistry, American Chemical Society
- 2016, “A Salute to Ted Benfey at 90: Science, History, Culture & a Commitment to Humanism,” symposium in Benfey’s honor, American Chemical Society national meeting in Philadelphia, 22 August 2016

== See also ==
- Alternative periodic tables
