= Robert Mokaya =

Kenyan-British chemist

Robert Mokaya OBE FRS
- Born: Kenya
- Education: University of Nairobi; University of Cambridge
- Awards: Fellow of the Royal Society (2023) Officer of the Order of the British Empire (2022) Royal Society Wolfson Research Merit Award (2017)
- Scientific career
- Workplaces: University of Cambridge; University of Nottingham
- Thesis: Layered materials as selective adsorbents. (1992)

Robert Minge Mokaya, OBE is a Kenyan-British chemist and President of the Royal Society of Chemistry. He is the first Black President in the Society's 185-year history. Prior to that he was Provost and Deputy-Vice-Chancellor at the University of Sheffield, where he remains an Emeritus Professor. Mokaya holds a Royal Society Wolfson Merit Award.

== Early life and education ==
Mokaya was born in Kenya. He attended the University of Nairobi, where he specialised in chemistry. After graduating he joined Unilever in Kenya. He moved to the University of Cambridge for his graduate studies, where he worked in the laboratory of William "Bill" Jones. After graduating, Mokaya was awarded a junior research fellowship, and started his independent career at Trinity College, Cambridge.

== Research and career ==
In 1996 Mokaya was named an Engineering and Physical Sciences Research Council Advanced Fellow, and by 2000 he had been made a lecturer at the University of Nottingham. In 2008 he was appointed Professor of Materials Chemistry. In 2017 Mokaya was awarded a Royal Society Wolfson Research Merit Award.

Mokaya was appointed Pro Vice-Chancellor for Global Engagement at the University of Nottingham in 2019. He was part of a Royal Society programme to strengthen the capacity of African researchers to design, synthesise and optimise porous materials.

Mokaya was appointed Officer of the Order of the British Empire (OBE) in the 2022 New Year Honours for services to the chemical sciences. In 2023, he was elected a Fellow of the Royal Society (FRS). In June 2024 Mokaya was announced as the President-Elect of the Royal Society of Chemistry. At the same time, he took up the post of Provost and Deputy-Vice-Chancellor at the University of Sheffield.

On September 1, 2025 Mokaya stepped down from his role at the University of Sheffield to focus on other activities.

In July 2026 Mokaya succeeded Annette Doherty as President of the Royal Society of Chemistry. He is the 95th president, and plans to prioritise supporting the organisation's growth globally during his term.

Mokaya's research focuses on new porous materials with applications in catalysis, gas and energy storage, and environmental remediation. He has published over 200 research articles and his H-index as of 2026 was 73.

He investigates novel materials for carbon sequestration, focusing primarily on hydrogen fuel cells. Mokaya considers porous materials and their structure-property relationships. Nanostructured porous materials contain significant internal volume, which can be used for enhanced gas storage. Amongst these, Mokaya has studied mesoporous molecular sieves, porous carbons and zeolite templated carbons. He forms the nanoporous carbons by filling organic materials into porous inorganic structures, then heating them to the temperature at which they turn into pure carbon.

As of December 2022, Mokaya is the only Black chemistry professor in the United Kingdom and stated that UK Research and Innovation has rejected all of his funding applications.

== Selected publications ==
- Yang, Zhuxian; Xia, Yongde; Mokaya, Robert (1 February 2007). "Enhanced Hydrogen Storage Capacity of High Surface Area Zeolite-like Carbon Materials". Journal of the American Chemical Society. 129 (6): 1673–1679. Bibcode:2007JAChS.129.1673Y. doi:10.1021/ja067149g. ISSN 0002-7863. PMID 17243684.
- Xia, Y.; Mokaya, R. (2004). "Synthesis of Ordered Mesoporous Carbon and Nitrogen-Doped Carbon Materials with Graphitic Pore Walls via a Simple Chemical Vapor Deposition Method". Advanced Materials. 16 (17): 1553–1558. Bibcode:2004AdM....16.1553X. doi:10.1002/adma.200400391. ISSN 1521-4095. S2CID 93117926.
- Matabosch Coromina, Helena; A Walsh, Darren; Mokaya, Robert (2016). "Biomass-derived activated carbon with simultaneously enhanced CO2 uptake for both pre and post combustion capture applications". Journal of Materials Chemistry A. 4 (1): 280–289. doi:10.1039/C5TA09202G. S2CID 98729819.
