= Olimpia Lombardi =

Argentine philosopher of science

- Lombardi in 2025
- Born: Olimpia Iris Lombardi; 16 March 1960 (age 66); Buenos Aires, Argentina
- Education: University of Buenos Aires
- Occupations: Philosopher, epistemologist, university professor, researcher
- Employers: National Scientific and Technical Research Council; University of Buenos Aires; Austral University
- Notable work: Los múltiples mundos de la ciencia; What Is Quantum Information?; Quantum Worlds; The Modal-Hamiltonian Interpretation of Quantum Mechanics
- Awards: Konex Award (2006)

Olimpia Iris Lombardi (born 16 March 1960) is an Argentine philosopher of science specializing in the philosophy of physics, the philosophy of chemistry, and the foundations of quantum mechanics.

== Biography and intellectual career ==
Lombardi studied at the University of Buenos Aires, where she earned a degree in electromechanical engineering with a specialization in electronics, a licentiate degree in philosophy, and a doctorate in philosophy. Her doctoral dissertation, defended at the university's Faculty of Philosophy and Letters, was titled El problema del determinismo en la física ("The Problem of Determinism in Physics").

She is a senior researcher at the National Scientific and Technical Research Council (CONICET), based at the Dr. Alejandro Korn Institute of Philosophy within the Faculty of Philosophy and Letters of the University of Buenos Aires. She is also a full professor of philosophy at Austral University. She directs the Philosophy of the Sciences: Physics, Chemistry, and Biology research group, based at the University of Buenos Aires Institute of Philosophy.

She has been recognized as a member of the Académie Internationale de Philosophie des Sciences and the Foundational Questions Institute, an honorary fellow of the John Bell Institute for the Foundations of Physics, and a research associate at the Centre for Philosophy of Natural and Social Science at the London School of Economics. In 2006, she received the Konex Award in the humanities, in the category of Logic and Philosophy of Science.

== Work and thought ==
Lombardi's work has developed along four main lines:

- Determinism and chaos theory;
- Philosophy of chemistry;
- Philosophy of information;
- Ontological interpretation of quantum mechanics.

In her work on determinism, Lombardi has examined the epistemological problems of chaos theory, arguing that unpredictability and algorithmic randomness are insufficient to define chaos and that, given the theory's mathematical nature, its definition must be sought in the properties of chaotic equations. She has proposed distinguishing among different senses of determinism and developing a notion of possibility suited to discussions of ontological determinism in physics.

In the philosophy of chemistry, she and Martín Labarca have developed a detailed defense of the ontological autonomy of the chemical world. On their account, the autonomy of chemistry cannot rest solely on the impossibility of epistemologically reducing chemical concepts and laws to physics; it also requires rejecting ontological reduction through a form of ontological pluralism. This position is connected to her defense of a Kantian-inspired realist pluralism, developed with Ana Rosa Pérez Ransanz in Los múltiples mundos de la ciencia.

In the philosophy of information, Lombardi has defended a pluralist position. On this account, Shannon's information theory provides a mathematical concept that admits different interpretations, associated, for example, with the acquisition of knowledge or with physical processes, whose usefulness depends on the context of application. Together with Federico Holik and Leonardo Vanni, she has argued that, in the context of communication, classical and quantum information are not two fundamentally different kinds of information. Information is physically neutral and can be encoded in either classical or quantum states. From this perspective, the distinctive features of quantum information arise from the physical resources used to encode and process it. With Cristian Ariel López, she has also proposed a causal account of communication: statistical correlation between a sender and a receiver is insufficient for communication; it must be possible to change the receiver's state through interventions on the sender.

Her most influential contribution to the philosophy of physics concerns the ontological interpretation of quantum mechanics. In "A Modal-Hamiltonian Interpretation of Quantum Mechanics," coauthored with Mario Castagnino, she presented a modal interpretation in which the Hamiltonian operator plays a decisive role in the rule for assigning definite properties—that is, in selecting the observables that acquire actual values. The proposal has since been developed in studies addressing, among other topics, Galilean covariance and optical isomerism.

In recent work, she has defended a quantum ontology of properties without individuals. In "Not Individuals, Nor Even Objects," she argued that an ontology of properties formulated within the algebraic formalism of quantum mechanics can address the theory's ontological challenges without treating quantum systems as classical individual objects. In The Modal-Hamiltonian Interpretation of Quantum Mechanics: Making Sense of the Quantum World, she systematized her modal-Hamiltonian interpretation as a realist, non-collapse interpretation of quantum mechanics.

== Recognition and public engagement ==
Lombardi received the 2006 Konex Award in Logic and Philosophy of Science. Her research has received international grants from the Foundational Questions Institute and the John Templeton Foundation.

Her work has also reached public audiences through outlets devoted to science communication and philosophical debate. In 2025, she published an article in IAI News, part of the Institute of Art and Ideas, presenting her ontological reading of quantum mechanics as a departure from the classical conception of individuals possessing identity and definite properties. In a 2026 interview with Agencia Paco Urondo, she explained that quantum mechanics challenges the traditional ontological categories of philosophy and common sense.

== Selected publications ==
=== Books ===
- Lombardi, Olimpia; Fortin, Sebastian; Ardenghi, Juan Sebastián; Castagnino, Mario (2010). Introduction to the Modal-Hamiltonian Interpretation of Quantum Mechanics. New York: Nova Science Publishers.
- Lombardi, Olimpia (2011). Aspectos filosóficos de la teoría del caos. Buenos Aires: Editorial Universitaria Rioplatense.
- Pérez Ransanz, Ana Rosa; Lombardi, Olimpia (2012). Los múltiples mundos de la ciencia: un realismo pluralista y su aplicación a la filosofía de la física. Mexico: Siglo XXI Editores.
- Lombardi, Olimpia (2015). ¿Existe la flecha del tiempo?: Ilya Prigogine: entre la ciencia y la filosofía. Buenos Aires: Ediciones Logos.
- Lombardi, Olimpia (2026). The Modal-Hamiltonian Interpretation of Quantum Mechanics: Making Sense of the Quantum World. Oxford: Oxford University Press.

=== Edited volumes ===
- Vanney, Claudia E.; Lombardi, Olimpia, eds. (2015). Fronteras del determinismo científico: filosofía y ciencias en diálogo. Madrid: Biblioteca Nueva.
- Lombardi, Olimpia; Fortin, Sebastian; Holik, Federico; López, Cristian, eds. (2017). What Is Quantum Information?. Cambridge: Cambridge University Press.
- Lombardi, Olimpia; Fortin, Sebastian; López, Cristian; Holik, Federico, eds. (2019). Quantum Worlds: Perspectives on the Ontology of Quantum Mechanics. Cambridge: Cambridge University Press.
- Lombardi, Olimpia; Martínez González, Juan Camilo; Fortin, Sebastian, eds. (2022). Philosophical Perspectives in Quantum Chemistry. Cham: Springer.
- López, Cristian; Lombardi, Olimpia, eds. (2025). The Arrow of Time: From Local Systems to the Whole Universe. Cambridge: Cambridge University Press.

=== Articles and chapters ===
- Lombardi, O. (2001). "La teoría del caos y sus problemas epistemológicos." Revista de Filosofía, 57, 91–109.
- Lombardi, O., & Labarca, M. (2005). "The Ontological Autonomy of the Chemical World." Foundations of Chemistry, 7, 125–148.
- Lombardi, O., & Castagnino, M. (2008). "A Modal-Hamiltonian Interpretation of Quantum Mechanics." Studies in History and Philosophy of Science Part B: Studies in History and Philosophy of Modern Physics, 39(2), 380–443.
- Lombardi, O., Castagnino, M., & Ardenghi, J. S. (2010). "The Modal-Hamiltonian Interpretation and the Galilean Covariance of Quantum Mechanics." Studies in History and Philosophy of Science Part B: Studies in History and Philosophy of Modern Physics, 41(2), 93–103.
- Lombardi, O. (2013). "Determinismo en física: la dimensión de lo posible." Anuario Filosófico, 46(2), 311–345.
- Lombardi, O., & Fortin, S. (2015). "The Role of Symmetry in the Interpretation of Quantum Mechanics." Electronic Journal of Theoretical Physics, 12, 255–272.
- Lombardi, O., & Dieks, D. (2017). "Modal Interpretations of Quantum Mechanics." In E. N. Zalta (ed.), The Stanford Encyclopedia of Philosophy.
- Fortin, S., Lombardi, O., & Martínez González, J. C. (2018). "A New Application of the Modal-Hamiltonian Interpretation of Quantum Mechanics: The Problem of Optical Isomerism." Studies in History and Philosophy of Science Part B: Studies in History and Philosophy of Modern Physics, 62, 123–135.
- Lombardi, O. (2019). "The Modal-Hamiltonian Interpretation: Measurement, Invariance, and Ontology." In O. Lombardi, S. Fortin, C. López & F. Holik (eds.), Quantum Worlds: Perspectives on the Ontology of Quantum Mechanics (pp. 32–50). New York: Cambridge University Press.
- López, C., & Lombardi, O. (2019). "No Communication Without Manipulation: A Causal-Deflationary View of Information." Studies in History and Philosophy of Science Part B: Studies in History and Philosophy of Modern Physics, 66, 34–43.
- Lombardi, O., Fortin, S., & Pasqualini, M. (2022). "Possibility and Time in Quantum Mechanics." Entropy, 24(2), 249.
- Lombardi, O. (2023). "Not Individuals, Nor Even Objects: On the Ontological Nature of Quantum Systems." In J. R. B. Arenhart & R. W. Arroyo (eds.), Non-Reflexive Logics, Non-Individuals, and the Philosophy of Quantum Mechanics (pp. 45–77). Cham: Springer.

== See also ==
- Philosophy of science
- Philosophy of physics
- Philosophy of chemistry
- Quantum mechanics
- Quantum decoherence
- Scientific realism
- Determinism
- Arrow of time
- National Scientific and Technical Research Council
- University of Buenos Aires
