= Eric Scerri =

American philosopher

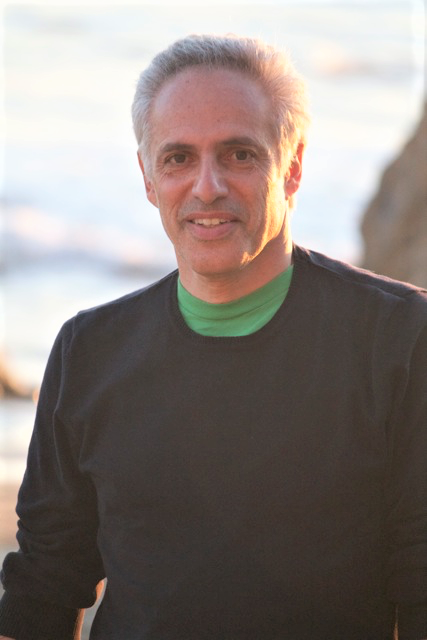
- Born: August 30, 1953 (age 73); Malta
- Citizenship: United States; United Kingdom
- Education: Walpole Grammar School, Westfield College, University of Cambridge, University of Southampton, King's College London
- Scientific career
- Fields: Chemistry, logic, history and philosophy of science, chemical education
- Workplaces: University of California, Los Angeles
- Doctoral advisor: Heinz Post
- Website: http://www.ericscerri.com/

Eric R. Scerri (born August 30, 1953) is an American chemist, writer and philosopher of science of Maltese origin. He is a lecturer at the University of California, Los Angeles; and the founder and editor-in-chief of Foundations of Chemistry, an international peer-reviewed journal covering the history and philosophy of chemistry, and chemical education.

He has worked on the history and philosophy of the periodic table and is the author and editor of several books in this and related fields. Scerri was a participant in the 2014 PBS documentary film, The Mystery of Matter.

Scerri attended Walpole Grammar School in Ealing. He received his BSc from Westfield College (University of London), his Certificate in Postgraduate Study from the University of Cambridge, his MPhil from the University of Southampton, and his PhD from King's College London.

== Research interests ==
Scerri's research has mainly been in the history and philosophy of chemistry, in particular on the question of the extent to which chemistry reduces to quantum mechanics. He has specialized in the study of the periodic table of the elements, including its historical origins and its philosophical significance. More recent writings have included critiques of claims for the emergence of chemistry and the existence of downward causation.

In addition to historical and philosophical work Scerri has published articles in the chemical education literature, including accounts of the electronic structures of transition metals and the occurrence of anomalous electron configurations.

In A Tale of Seven Elements (2013) Scerri recounts the story of the discovery of the seven elements missing from the periodic table shortly after the turn of the 20th century, including the setbacks, misguided claims, and sometimes acrimonious priority debates and disputes.

In December 2015, Scerri was appointed by IUPAC as the chair of a project to make a recommendation on the composition of group 3—whether it should consist of scandium, yttrium, lanthanum and actinium; or scandium, yttrium, lutetium and lawrencium. In January 2021, the project issued a provisional report in IUPAC's news magazine Chemistry International suggesting the latter placement. This accords with a previous IUPAC report from 1988, as well as a suggestion by Lev Landau and Evgeny Lifshitz in their Course of Theoretical Physics.

Most recently (2016) he proposed an evolutionary approach to the philosophy of science based on seven case studies of little known scientists such as John Nicholson, Anton Van den Broek and Edmund Stoner. Scerri has argued that these lesser known figures are just as significant as they constitute the missing gaps in a gradual evolutionary and organic growth in the body of scientific knowledge. Although he rejects the occurrence of scientific revolutions as envisioned by Thomas Kuhn, Scerri supports Kuhn's notion that scientific progress is non-teleological and that there is no approach towards an external truth.

== Publications ==
=== Books ===
- 2020, What is a Chemical Element? co-edited with E. Ghibaudi, Oxford University Press, New York, ISBN 9780190933784
- 2020, The Periodic Table: Its Story and Its Significance, 2nd edition, Oxford University Press, New York, ISBN 978-0190914363
- 2019, The Periodic Table: A Very Short Introduction, 2nd edition, Oxford University Press, New York, ISBN 978-0198842323
- 2018, Mendeleev to Oganesson: A Multidisciplinary Perspective on the Periodic Table, with co-editor G Restrepo, Oxford University Press, New York, ISBN 978-0190668532
- 2016, A Tale of Seven Scientists, and a New Philosophy of Science, Oxford University Press, New York, ISBN 978-0190232993
- 2016, Essays in the Philosophy of Chemistry, with co-editor Fisher G. Oxford University Press, New York, ISBN 9780190494599
- 2015, Philosophy of Chemistry: Growth of a New Discipline, with co-editor McIntyre L. Springer, Dordrecht, Berlin, ISBN 978-94-017-9364-3
- 2013, A tale of seven elements, Oxford University Press, Oxford, ISBN 9780195391312
- 2013, 30-second elements: The 50 most significant elements, each explained in half a minute, as editor, Metro Books, New York, ISBN 9781435145214
- 2011, The periodic table: A very short introduction, Oxford University Press, Oxford, ISBN 9780199582495
- 2009, Selected papers on the periodic table, Imperial College Press, London, ISBN 9781848164253
- 2008, Collected papers on philosophy of chemistry, Imperial College Press, London, ISBN 9781848161375
- 2007, The periodic table: Its story and its significance, Oxford University Press, New York, ISBN 9780195305739
- 2006, Philosophy of Chemistry: Synthesis of a New Discipline, with co-editors Baird D & McIntyre L, Springer, Dordrecht, ISBN 1402032560
