= Lesley Yellowlees =

British chemist (born 1953)

Lesley Yellowlees CBE FRSE FRSC
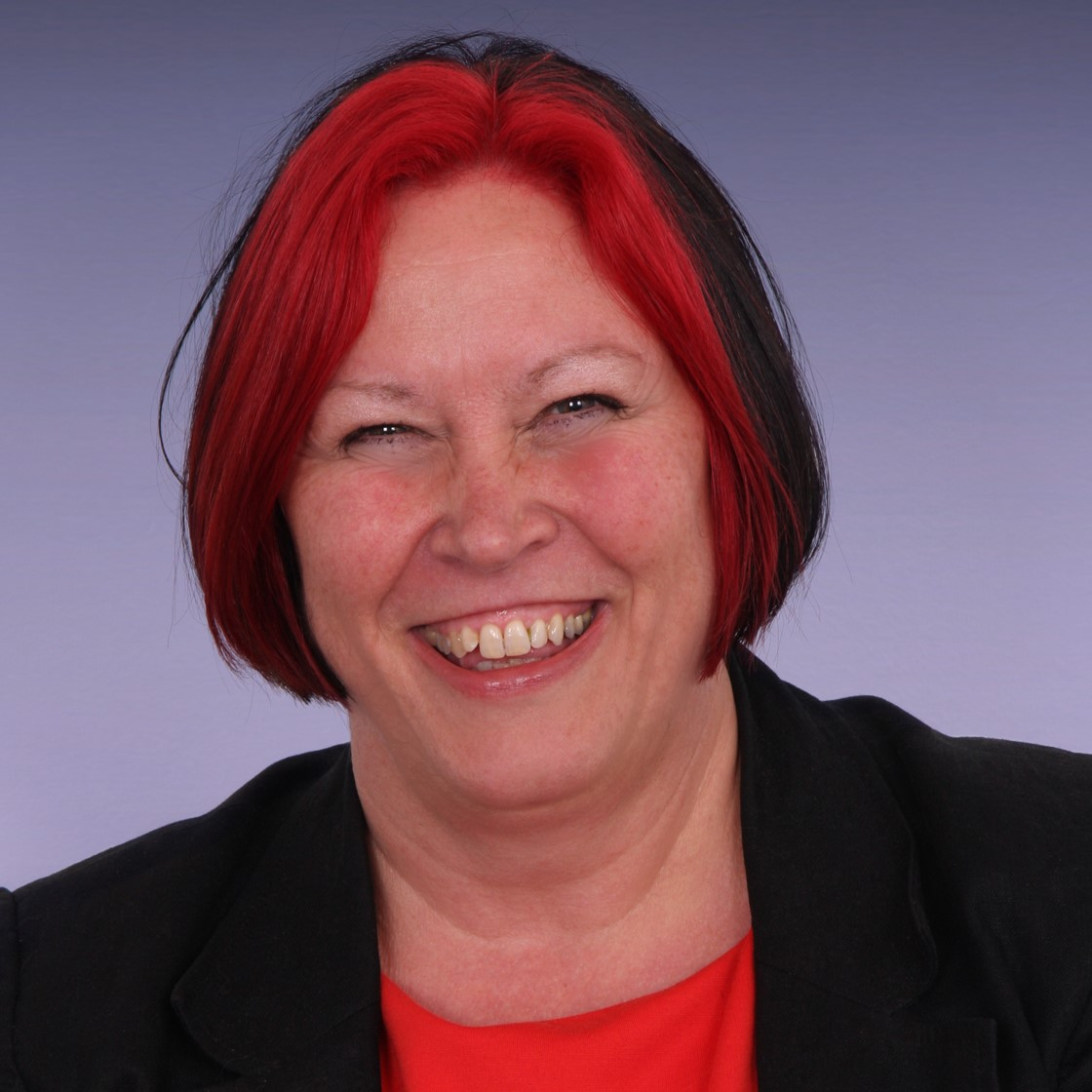
- Professor Lesley Yellowlees
- Born: Lesley Jane Yellowlees; 1953 (age 72–73); London, UK
- Education: University of Edinburgh
- Spouse: Peter W. Yellowlees
- Children: Sarah, Mark
- Scientific career
- Fields: Inorganic chemistry; Electrochemistry
- Workplaces: Royal Society of Chemistry; University of Queensland; University of Glasgow; University of Edinburgh
- Thesis: Spectro-electrochemical studies on luminescent complexes (1983)
- Yellowlees' voice Recorded during her Royal Society of Chemistry presidency
- Website: www.chem.ed.ac.uk/staff/academic-staff/professor-lesley-yellowlees

Lesley Jane Yellowlees (born 1953) is a British inorganic chemist conducting research in Spectroelectrochemistry, Electron transfer reactions and Electron paramagnetic resonance (EPR) Spectroscopy. Yellowlees was also elected as the president of the Royal Society of Chemistry 2012–14 and was the first woman to hold that role .

== Early life and education ==
Yellowlees was born in 1953 in London, moving to Edinburgh at the age of 9 and attending St Hilary's Girls' School. Her father worked for Rank Hovis McDougall, and she has two sisters. She completed her higher education at the University of Edinburgh, gaining a BSc in Chemical Physics in 1975, and PhD in Inorganic Electrochemistry in 1982. Yellowlees was the only woman graduate in her undergraduate class, graduating with a first. Continuing on from this Yellowlees began her postdoctoral research in the University of Glasgow in 1983.

== Career and research ==
Lesley Yellowlees' first job was as an administrator in the National Health Service, but after moving to Brisbane, she went into electrochemical research subsequently worked in the University of Queensland. Returning to the University of Edinburgh, to do a PhD on solar cell chemistry, Yellowlees became a demonstrator in 1986, a lecturer in 1989 and was appointed Professor of Inorganic Electrochemistry in 2005. She was the first woman to be appointed head of chemistry in the university. And is also vice-principal of the university and head of the College of Science and Engineering.

=== Honours and awards ===
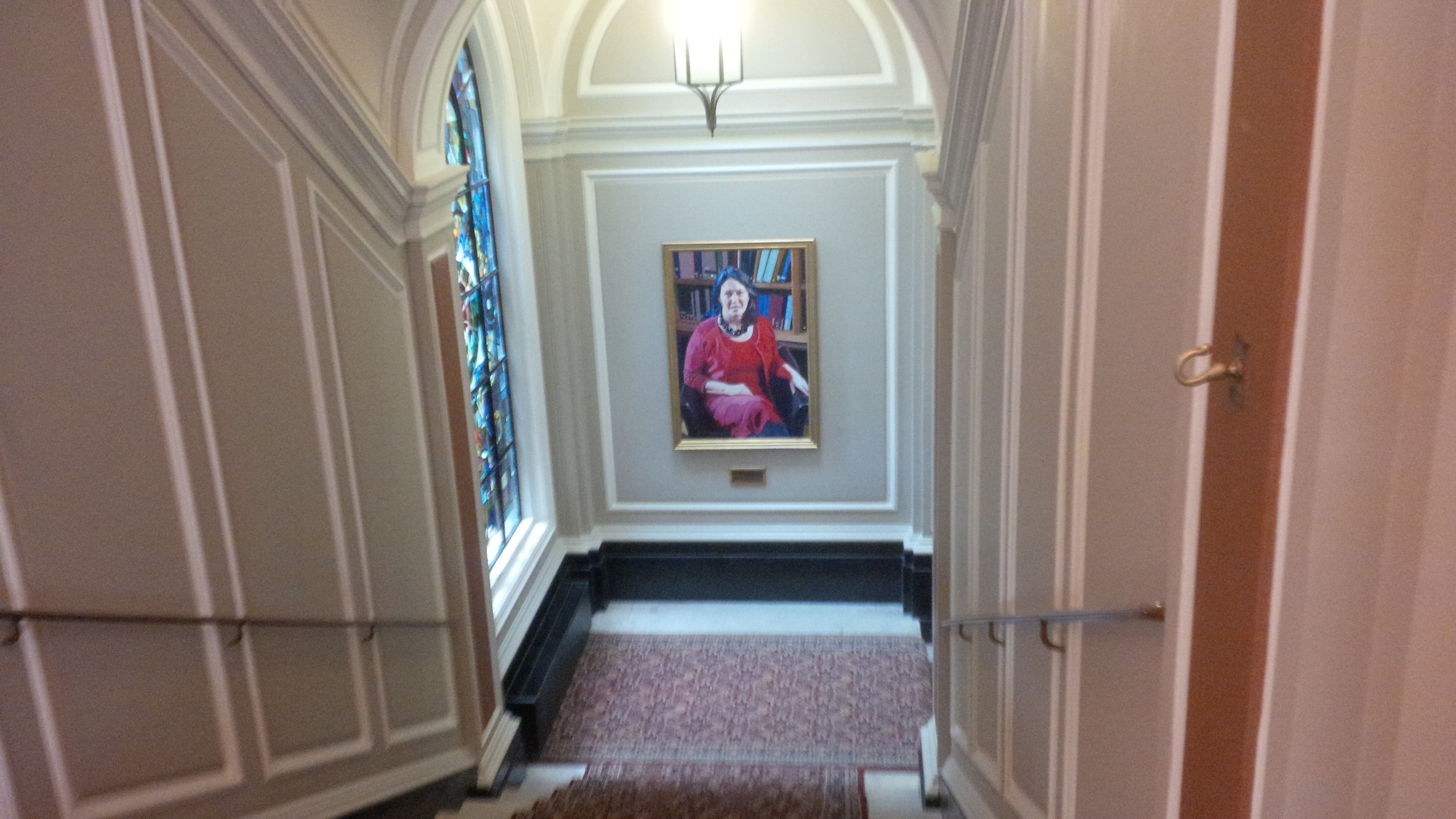
A portrait of Prof Yellowlees, by Peter Edwards, hangs on the staircase of the Royal Society of Chemistry.

Yellowlees was made a Fellow of the Royal Society of Chemistry in 2005 and an Honorary Fellow of Royal Society of Chemistry in 2015. She became a Fellow of the Royal Society of Edinburgh in 2012. and is also a Fellow of the Institute of Physics.

To mark the International Year of Chemistry, IUPAC selected 25 women including Yellowlees for the Distinguished Women Chemistry/Chemical Engineering Award.

She took over the presidency of the Royal Society of Chemistry on 4 July 2012 for a two-year term (she was succeeded by Professor Dominic Tildesley).

The National Portrait Gallery has two portraits of her. There is also a painting of her by Peter Edwards in Burlington House, the headquarters of the Royal Society of Chemistry.

Yellowlees was appointed MBE in 2005 for services to science and CBE in the 2014 New Year Honours for services to chemistry.

Yellowlees holds Honorary Doctorates from Heriot-Watt University (awarded in 2012), and Edinburgh Napier University (awarded in 2016).

Yellowlees was named the University of Edinburgh Alumnus of the Year 2013 in honour of her research, leadership and her work as an advocate for women in STEM subjects.

In 2014, she was included in the BBC's 100 Women.

== Personal life ==
She is married to Peter W. Yellowlees, a Chartered Accountant, and they have two children.
