= The Chemical Educator =

- Discipline: Chemistry
- Language: English

Publication details
- History: 1996–present

Standard abbreviations
- ISO 4: Chem. Educ.

Indexing
- ISSN: 1430-4171

The Chemical Educator (TCE) is a peer-reviewed journal in chemical education founded by Clifford LeMaster with the first publication in March 1996. It was first published by Springer-Verlag from 1996 to 2002, and later published online independently from 2003 to 2025. Since 2026, TCE has been published by the University of California Press.
