= Westhoughton High School =

Location
- Bolton Road; Westhoughton, Greater Manchester, BL5 3BZ; England; 53°32′55″N 2°31′02″W

Information
- Other name: WHS
- Type: Community school
- Local authority: Bolton Council
- Department for Education URN: 105252 Tables
- Ofsted: Reports
- Head teacher: Neil Coe
- Gender: Mixed
- Age range: 11–16
- Enrolment: 1,248
- Capacity: 1,350
- Website: www.westhoughton-high.org

Westhoughton High School (WHS) is an 11–16 mixed, community secondary school in Westhoughton, Greater Manchester, England.

== History ==
A new soundproofed music room opened at the school in 1982 as part of a £750,000 extension. In July 2010, Westhoughton High School was revealed as one of 27 schools across Greater Manchester that would no longer be rebuilt or upgraded, following the scrapping of the Building Schools for the Future (BSF) programme by the government. A new 3G all-weather pitch was constructed on an existing shale pitch at the school that was completed in May 2017, and was the first of three new pitches that was being developed as part of Bolton Council's £1.5 million capital funding. The school revised its curriculum from September 2017 to benefit from the new pitch, and be able to offer a programme of fixtures with local schools. In 2026, a satirical social media page titled "Westhoughton High Friends of Agartha" was referenced in an article by The Atlantic discussing the spread of Agartha-related memes among young people.

=== Demand for places and extension ===
In February 2018, proposals were approved for Bolton Council to work with seven secondary schools in the Metropolitan Borough of Bolton to increase its capacity due to an increasing demand for places. A six-week public consultation started in June 2018 to increase Westhoughton High's admission number from 230 to 270 in Year Seven from September 2018, that would see the school's total capacity increase from 1,150 to 1,350. A separate consultation would be held for a building extension with a planning application submitted to the council, and concerns were raised by parents over the lack of outdoor space for current students. In August 2018, it was announced that £2.4 million would be spent on expanding the school, however due to the demand for places the school had already begun to admit higher numbers. A proposal was sent to the Executive Cabinet Member for Children's Services to authorise the publication of a 'statutory notice' to increase places, and if approved, the admission number increase will take place in September.

The funding was approved in August 2018 and the building extension was approved by the council's planning committee in December 2018, which involved a new two-storey classroom block being built on a field behind the school, and an existing smaller block being demolished; construction began in 2019. Councillors however warned it would not meet future demands and due to new developments in Westhoughton meant more places would need to be created.

=== Sex Crimes ===
In August 2024 Westhoughton High School's ICT teacher Matthew Gilkes was arrested after covertly photographing children in the changing rooms of a leisure centre. Police raided Gilkes' home and seized more than 80 devices, including a school issued laptop. These devices contained more than a million indecent images of children. Police confirmed that many of the images had been created by Gilkes and were of children who had attended Westhoughton High School where Gilkes had used hidden cameras concealed in pens to upskirt pupils. Gilkes also posed as a teenage boy in order to groom children online. On the 12th of November 2025 Gilkes plead guilty to 42 charges at Preston Crown Court.. In May 2026 Gilkes was jailed for 16 years.

In July 2026 another member of staff at Westhoughton High School who has not been named by police was arrested after allegedly inappropriately communicating with three pupils.

== Notable alumni ==
- Maxine Peake, actress

== Notable staff ==
- Kristy Turner, former teacher
