= Dominic Tildesley =

British chemist

Professor Dominic Tildesley
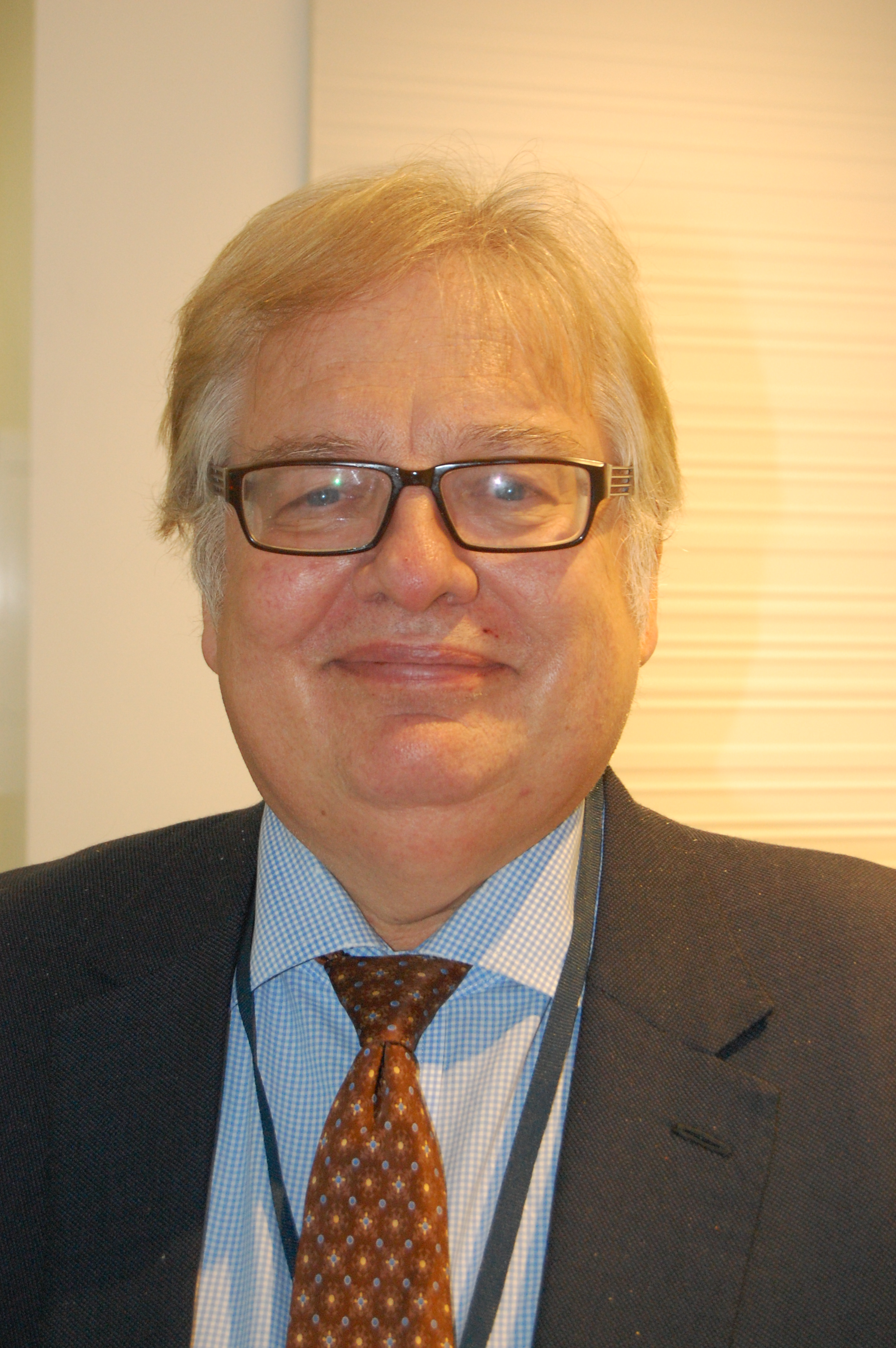
- Tildesley in December 2014
- Born: 1952 (age 73–74); Forest Hill, London, England
- Education: University of Southampton; Oxford University
- Occupation: Chemist
- Known for: President of the Royal Society of Chemistry (July 2014 – present)
- Tildesley's voice recorded December 2014

Dominic Tildesley (born 1952, Forest Hill) is a British chemist. He gained his undergraduate chemistry degree from the University of Southampton in 1973. He went on to complete a DPhil at Oxford University in 1976 before undertaking postdoctoral research at Penn State and Cornell universities in the United States. He returned to the University of Southampton in the UK for a lectureship, before becoming professor of theoretical chemistry and moving to Imperial College London in 1996 as Professor of Computational Chemistry.

He began his industrial career in 1998 when he took the role of head of the Physical Science Group at Unilever Research Port Sunlight, where he remained until 2012. He is director of the European Centre for Atomic and Molecular Computation at the Ecole Polytechnique Federale de Lausanne in Switzerland.

In July 2014, he became president of the Royal Society of Chemistry (succeeding Professor Lesley Yellowlees) and received an honorary degree from the University of Southampton.
