= Fred Aftalion =

French chemical engineer (1922–2022)

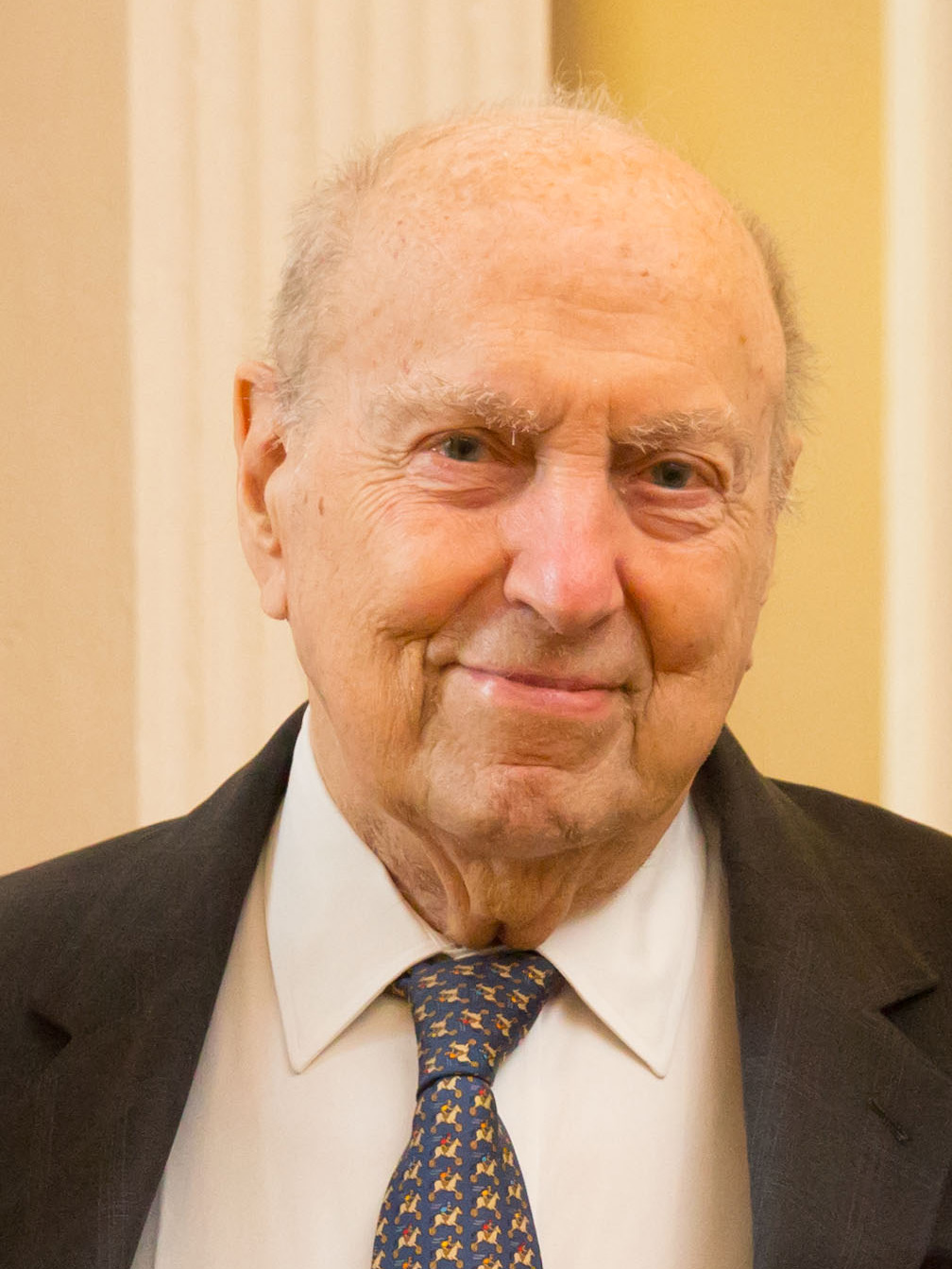
- Aftalion in 2014
- Born: Alfred Henri Aftalion; 2 May 1922; Paris, France
- Died: 24 May 2022 (aged 100); Paris, France
- Education: École nationale supérieure de chimie de Paris
- Scientific career
- Fields: Chemical engineering
- Workplaces: Société Française d’Organo-Synthèse

Alfred Henri Aftalion (2 May 1922 – 24 May 2022), better known as Fred Aftalion, was a French chemical engineer who held leadership positions in the French chemical industry for three decades. He also served as Vice-President of ALEPS, the Association pour la Liberté Economique et le Progrès Social (Association of Liberal Economists). He wrote and commented on economics and politics from a viewpoint of economic liberalism via ALEPS and Radio Courtoisie.

He wrote a number of books dealing with chemistry, industry and society. In 2014, he received the Franklin-Lavoisier Prize for his writings on the history of the international chemical industry.

== Education ==
Alfred Henri "Fred" Aftalion was born on 2 May 1922 to Jacques Aftalion and Renée (Haime) Aftalion. Aftalion graduated from the École nationale supérieure de chimie de Paris, where he studied chemical engineering. He also studied with Herman Mark, head of the Polymer Institute of the Polytechnic Institute of Brooklyn in 1946.

== Career ==
Aftalion became an engineer with Hercules Inc., working in the United States and Latin America. He returned to France in 1951 and joined the petrochemical company Naphtachimie.

In 1956, he became manager of the Société Française d’Organo-Synthèse (SFOS), a specialty chemicals company which was part of the French pharmaceutical house Laboratoire Roger Bellon. Aftalion directed the company for the next three decades. During this time, the company moved from a 50/50 split between pharmaceutical and industrial chemicals, to a 20/80 split. After Rhône-Poulenc acquired an interest in Roger Bellon in 1964, Aftalion became a board member of Rhône-Poulenc Spécialités Chimiques.

Aftalion served as president of the Société La Vermiculite et la Perlite from 1967 to 1973. He served on the Boards of Directors of Total Chimie and of the Fondation de la Maison de la Chimie in Paris, France.

Aftalion became a member of the Mont Pelerin Society in 1971. He was vice-president of ALEPS, the Association pour la Liberté Economique et le Progrès Social (Association of Liberal Economists) He spoke and wrote on economic and political issues from a viewpoint of Economic liberalism via ALEPS and Radio Courtoisie.

His book Histoire de la chimie, translated as A History of the International Chemical Industry, describes the rise of the chemical industry in the international community. It traces connections between science, industry and society. Aftalion received the 2014 Franklin-Lavoisier Prize for his writing on chemistry, industry and society.

== Personal life ==
Aftalion died on 24 May 2022, at the age of 100. His funeral took place in Paris on 1 June 2022. He was survived by two daughters and grandchildren.

== Works ==
- 2012, Pourquoi ne pas le dire? by Fred Aftalion. Paris : Ed. du Trident, c2012.
- 2007, Histoire de la révolution bourgeoise : de ses origines à nos jours by Fred Aftalion. Paris : Ed. du Trident, 2007.
- 1995, Protection de l'environnement : pour que de fausses solutions ne deviennent pas de vrais problèmes by Fred Aftalion. Paris : Ed. France-Empire, 1995.
- 1993, Social-démocratie, dernier avatar du socialisme : histoire d'une utopie, 1945-1993 by Fred Aftalion. Paris : France-Empire, c1993.
- 1991, History of the international chemical industry by Fred Aftalion; translated by Otto Theodor Benfey. Philadelphia : University of Pennsylvania Press, c1991; Philadelphia, PA : Chemical Heritage Press, 2001.
- 1990, Faillite de l'économie administrée : le paradoxe français by Fred Aftalion. Paris : Presses universitaires de France, c1990.
- 1988, Histoire de la chimie by Fred Aftalion. Paris; Milan : Masson, 1988.
- 1967, Libres, égaux, fraternels? by Fred Aftalion. [Paris] Plon, 1967.

== Awards ==
- 3 April 2014, Franklin-Lavoisier Prize, Chemical Heritage Foundation and the Fondation de la Maison de la Chimie
