= Foundations of Chemistry =

- Discipline: Philosophy of chemistry, history of chemistry, chemistry education
- Language: English

Publication details
- History: 1999–present
- Publisher: Springer Science+Business Media
- Frequency: Triannually
- Impact factor: 1.263 (2020)

Standard abbreviations
- ISO 4: Found. Chem.

Indexing
- ISSN: 1386-4238 (print); 1572-8463 (web)
- OCLC no.: 231800946

Links
- Journal homepage; Online access

Foundations of Chemistry is a triannual peer-reviewed academic journal covering conceptual and fundamental issues related to chemistry, including philosophy and history of chemistry, and chemistry education. The founding and current editor-in-chief is Eric Scerri. According to the Journal Citation Reports, the journal has a 2020 impact factor of 1.263.
