= Christopher Benfey =

American literary critic and scholar

- Born: October 28, 1954 (age 72); Merion, Pennsylvania, U.S.
- Education: Guilford College (AB); Harvard University (PhD)
- Occupations: Professor, author, critic
- Writing career
- Subject: Emily Dickinson
- Notable works: Degas in New Orleans (1997); Red Brick, Black Mountain, White Clay (2012)
- Notable awards: Guggenheim Fellow (1988); MacDowell Fellow (1988)

Christopher Benfey (born October 28, 1954) is an American literary critic and Emily Dickinson scholar. He is a Professor Emeritus of English at Mount Holyoke College.

== Early life and education ==
Benfey was born in Merion, Pennsylvania, but spent most of his childhood in Richmond, Indiana. He attended The Putney School. His father was a German immigrant and his mother was from North Carolina.

He began his undergraduate studies at Earlham College, where his father, Otto Theodor Benfey, was a professor in the Chemistry department, and completed his Bachelor of Arts at Guilford College. Benfey holds a PhD in Comparative Literature from Harvard University.

== Career ==
Benfey is a specialist in 19th and 20th century American literature. He has written multiple works of nonfiction on famous American poets and authors such as Emily Dickinson, Stephen Crane, Harriett Beecher Stowe, Kate Chopin, Mark Twain, and more.

He is also an established essayist and critic who has been published in The Atlantic, The New York Times, The New Republic, The New York Review of Books, Harper's Magazine, and Times Literary Supplement. He was an art critic for Slate.

Benfey's poems have appeared in The Paris Review, Pequod, and Ploughshares.

His family memoir, Red Brick, Black Mountain, White Clay, was published by Penguin Press in 2012. Kirkus Reviews called it "a lyrical but unsentimental family memoir, taking in art, memory and time." Adam Goodheart at The New York Times Book Review described the memoir as "a book about earthen vases, epic voyages and ancestral blood. Part memoir, part family saga, part travelogue, part cultural history, it takes readers on a peripatetic ramble across America and beyond."

He is Professor Emeritus of English, formerly the Andrew W. Mellon Professor of English, at Mount Holyoke College, where he has taught since 1989. He is a Guggenheim Fellow, a MacDowell Fellow, and a fellow of the National Endowment for the Humanities. In 2013, Benfey received the Harold D. Vursell Memorial Award from the American Academy of Arts and Letters.

== Selected works ==
=== Memoir ===
- Red Brick, Black Mountain, White Clay. Penguin Press. 2012. ISBN 9781594203268.

=== Nonfiction ===
- Emily Dickinson: Lives of a Poet. George Braziller Inc. 1986. ISBN 9780807611500.
- The Double Life of Stephen Crane: A Biography. Knopf. 1992. ISBN 9780394568645.
- Degas in New Orleans: Encounters in the Creole World of Kate Chopin and George Washington Cable. Knopf. 1997. ISBN 9780679435624.
- The Great Wave: Gilded Age Misfits, Japanese Eccentrics, and the Opening of Old Japan. Random House. 2003. ISBN 9780375503276.
- A Summer of Hummingbirds: Love, Art, and Scandal in the Intersecting Worlds of Emily Dickinson, Mark Twain, Harriet Beecher Stowe, and Martin Johnson Heade. Penguin Press. 2008. ISBN 9781594201608.
- American Audacity: Literary Essays North and South. University of Michigan Press. 2008. ISBN 9780472116263.
- If: The Untold Story of Kipling's American Years. Penguin Press. 2019. ISBN 9780735221437.

=== As editor ===
- —; Karen Remmler, eds. (2006). Artists, Intellectuals, and World War II: The Pontigny Encounters at Mount Holyoke College, 1942-1944. University of Massachusetts Press. ISBN 9781558495319.
