= Chemistry Education Research and Practice =

- Discipline: Chemistry education
- Language: English
- Edited by: Gwen Lawrie

Publication details
- History: 2000-present
- Publisher: Royal Society of Chemistry (United Kingdom)
- Frequency: Quarterly
- Open access: Yes
- Impact factor: 3.367 (2021)

Standard abbreviations
- ISO 4: Chem. Educ. Res. Pract.

Indexing
- CODEN: CERPCE
- ISSN: 1109-4028
- OCLC no.: 613094024

Links
- Journal homepage; Online archive

Chemistry Education Research and Practice is a quarterly peer-reviewed open access academic journal published by the Royal Society of Chemistry covering chemistry education and chemistry education research. The editor-in-chief is Gwen Lawrie of the University of Queensland. The Associate Editors are Ajda Kahveci of DePaul University, Scott E. Lewis of the University of South Florida, and Michael K. Seery of the University of Edinburgh. According to the Journal Citation Reports, the journal has a 2020 impact factor of 2.959.

The journal was originally published by the University of Ioannina, but switched to the Royal Society of Chemistry at the end of 2005 when it merged with University Chemistry Education. The society also publishes Education in Chemistry, a news magazine on the same topic.

== Sponsorship by the RSC ==
The journal is able to be open-access, yet not have page or process charges levied against authors, due to sponsorship from the Education Division of the RSC. The RSC is a charity, as well as a learned society, and support for an open-access educational journal is seen as furthering its educational mission.

== Theme issues ==
The journal includes an annual issue on a specific theme. Past theme issues are listed on the journal website.
