= Education in Chemistry =

UK magazine

- Editor: Lisa Clatworthy
- Categories: Chemistry education
- Frequency: Bimonthly
- Publisher: Royal Society of Chemistry
- Founded: 1964
- Country: United Kingdom
- Website: edu.rsc.org/eic
- ISSN: 0013-1350
- OCLC: 1567546

Education in Chemistry (often referred to by its brand 'EiC') is a print and online magazine covering all areas of chemistry education, mainly concentrating on the teaching of chemistry in secondary schools and universities. It is published by the Royal Society of Chemistry, which also publishes Chemistry Education Research and Practice, a peer-reviewed academic journal on the same topic.

== History ==
The feasibility of a "British Journal of Chemistry Education" was first discussed by the Royal Society of Chemistry in late 1962 (a similar journal, the Journal of Chemical Education had been in existence in the USA since 1924). Its launch was secured by the lobbying of Professor Ronald S. Nyholm who became the first Chair of the editorial board. The magazine was launched in 1963 under the editor Dr F. W. Gibbs with the first issue published in January 1964. Gibbs' first editorial, "Scientists and Teachers", set out the aims of the publication, "This journal has been launched with the avowed aim of improving the teaching and learning of chemistry at all levels." The journal was initially published quarterly.

Education in Chemistry celebrated 50 years since its launch in 2013 with an event attended by its current and former staff, contributors, editorial board and some special guests including Bill Bryson.

== Current publication ==
The editor is Lisa Clatworthy. It has been available as an app for mobile devices which was discontinued in mid-2018. It has also trialled a blog, and occasional additional supplements published online. The magazine is published bimonthly in print and operates on "online first" publishing model which supersedes its previous innovations in blogging. Print copies are sent for free to all secondary schools in the UK and Ireland.
