= Royal Society of Chemistry =

Learned society in the United Kingdom

Coordinates: 51.5089°N 0.1390°W

The Royal Society of Chemistry
- Logo since 2019
- Formation: 1980 (1841)
- Type: Learned society
- Headquarters: Burlington House; London
- Location: United Kingdom
- Members: 50,000+
- Official language: English
- Patron: Charles III
- President: Robert Mokaya
- President-Elect: David Leigh
- Key people: Helen Pain (CEO)
- Budget: £65.7M
- Website: www.rsc.org

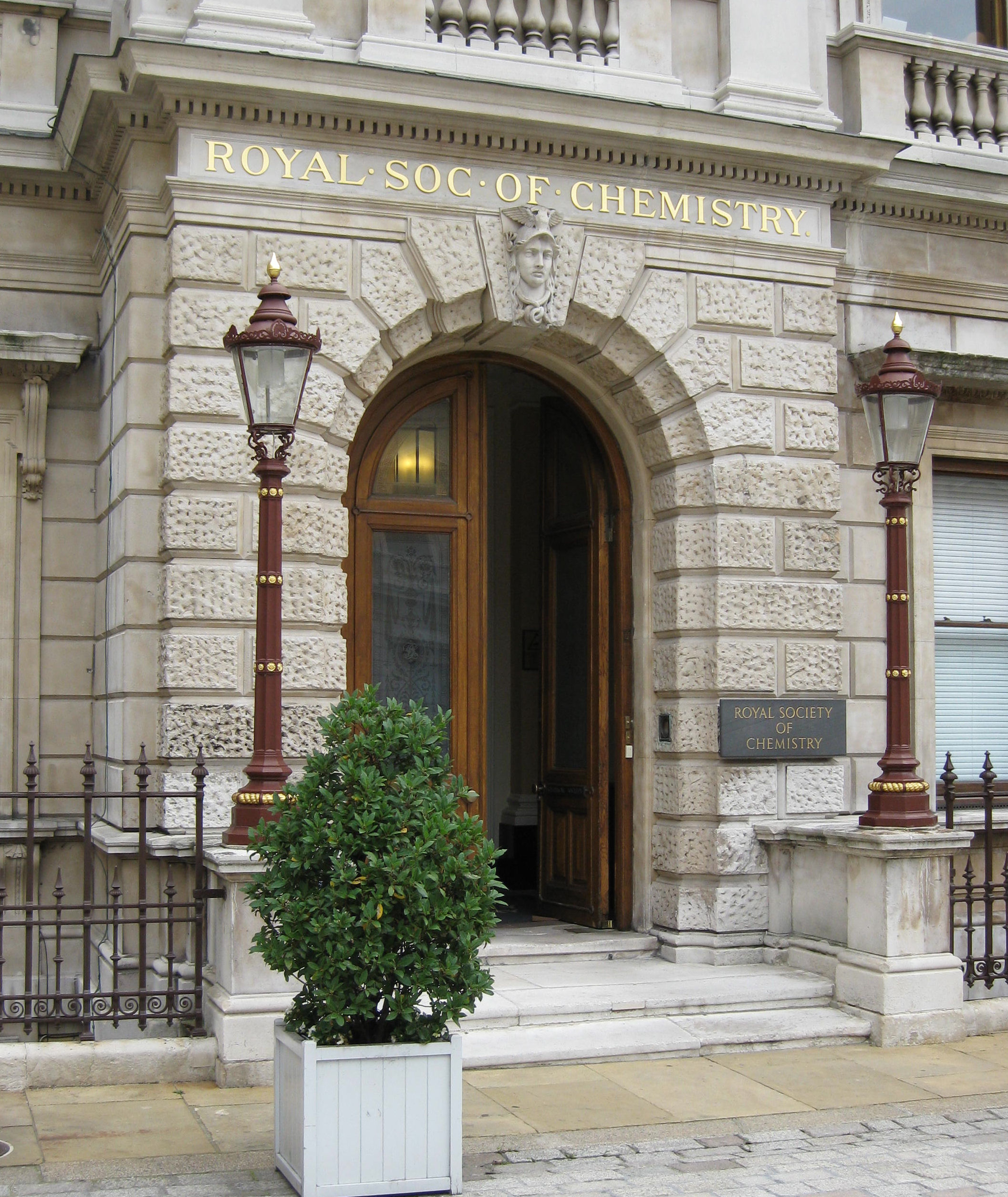
RSC London headquarters

The Royal Society of Chemistry (RSC) is a learned society and professional association in the United Kingdom with the goal of "advancing the chemical sciences". It was formed in 1980 from the amalgamation of the Chemical Society, the Royal Institute of Chemistry, the Faraday Society, and the Society for Analytical Chemistry with a new Royal Charter and the dual role of learned society and professional body. At its inception, the Society had a combined membership of 49,000 in the world.

The headquarters of the Society are at Burlington House, Piccadilly, London. It also has offices in Thomas Graham House in Cambridge (named after Thomas Graham, the first president of the Chemical Society) where RSC Publishing is based. The Society has offices in the United States, on the campuses of The University of Pennsylvania and Drexel University, at the University City Science Center in Philadelphia, Pennsylvania, in both Beijing and Shanghai, China and in Bangalore, India.

The organisation carries out research, publishes journals, books and databases, as well as hosting conferences, seminars and workshops. It is the professional body for chemistry in the UK, with the ability to award the status of Chartered Chemist (CChem) and, through the Science Council the awards of Chartered Scientist (CSci), Registered Scientist (RSci) and Registered Science Technician (RScTech) to suitably qualified candidates.

The designation FRSC is given to a group of elected Fellows of the society who have made major contributions to chemistry and other interface disciplines such as biological chemistry. Prior to 2006, the names of Fellows were published each year in The Times (London). Honorary Fellowship of the Society ("HonFRSC") is awarded for distinguished service in the field of chemistry.

== President ==
The president is elected biennially and wears a badge in the form of a spoked wheel, with the standing figure of Joseph Priestley depicted in enamel, mainly in red and blue, on a hexagonal medallion in the centre. The rim of the wheel is gold, and the twelve spokes are of non-tarnishable metals. The current president is Annette Doherty (2024–2026). Past presidents of the society have been:

- 1980–1982: Sir Ewart Ray Herbert Jones (1911–2002)
- 1982–1984: Sir John Ivan George Cadogan (1930–2020)
- 1984–1986: Richard Oswald Chandler Norman (1932–1993)
- 1986–1988: Sir Jack Lewis (1928–2014)
- 1988–1990: John Mason Ward (1921–2014)
- 1990–1992: Sir Rex Edward Richards (1922–2019)
- 1992–1994: Charles Wayne Rees (1927–2006)
- 1994–1996: John Howard Purnell (1925–1996)
- 1996–1998: Edward William Abel (1931– 2021)
- 1998–2000: Anthony Ledwith (1933–2015)
- 2000–2002: Steven Victor Ley (1945–)
- 2002–2004: Sir Harold Kroto (1939–2016)
- 2004–2006: Simon Campbell (1941–)
- 2006–2008: James Feast (1938–)
- 2008–2010: David Garner (1941–)
- 2010–2012: David Phillips (1939–)
- 2012–2014: Lesley Yellowlees (1953–)
- 2014–2016: Dominic Tildesley (1952–)
- 2016–2018: Sir John Holman (1946–)
- 2018–2020: Dame Carol Vivien Robinson (1956–)
- 2020–2022: Tom Welton (1964–)
- 2022–2024: Gillian Reid (1964–)
- 2024–2026: Annette Doherty
- 2026–2028: Robert Mokaya
- 2028–2030: David Leigh (1963–)

== Coat of arms ==
The RSC has its own coat of arms. Two forms exist: the full coat of arms has lion and unicorn bearers, and the Latin motto "Pro scientia et humanitate" (For the sake of knowledge and for the benefit of mankind). The smaller version is similar to the Royal Institute of Chemistry's arms.

Shield

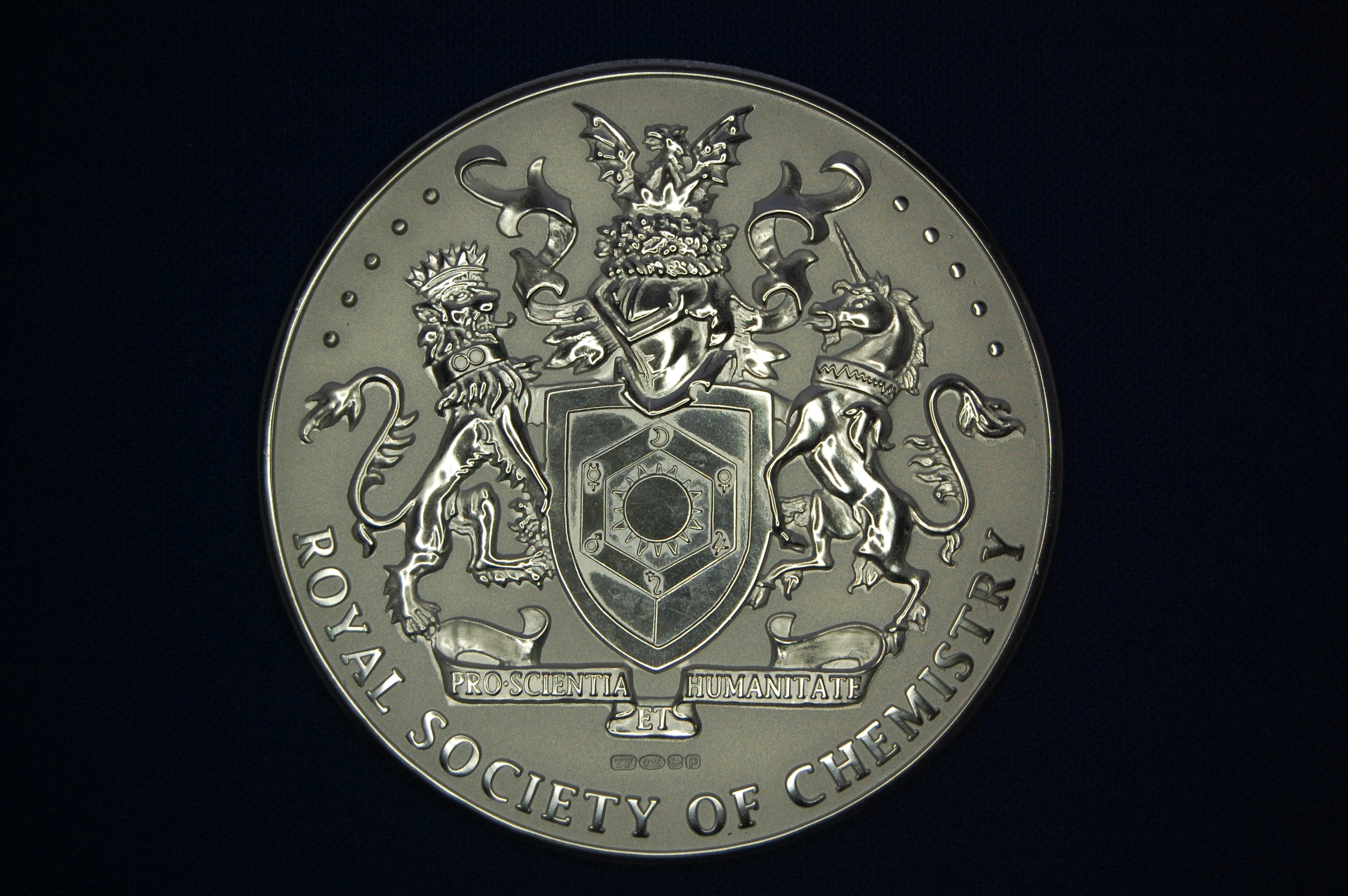
Arms on the Society's Robert Boyle Prize for Analytical Science medal

== Membership categories and post-nominals ==
The following are membership categories with post-nominals (designatory letters):

- Affiliate Member: (no post-nominal) The category for students and those involved in chemical science who do not meet the requirements for the following grades.
- AMRSC: Associate Member of the Royal Society of Chemistry The entry level for RSC membership, AMRSC is awarded to graduates (or equivalent) in the chemical sciences.
- MRSC: Member of the Royal Society of Chemistry Awarded to graduates (or equivalent) with at least 3 years' experience, who have acquired key skills through professional activity
- FRSC: Fellow of the Royal Society of Chemistry is awarded to those who have made an outstanding contribution to the chemical sciences (see Category:Fellows of the Royal Society of Chemistry).
  - HonFRSC: Honorary Fellow of the Royal Society of Chemistry is awarded to any person distinguished in the science or profession of chemistry.
  - Note: in 1904 eighteen women chemists petitioned to be made Fellow
- CChem: Chartered Chemist The award of CChem is considered separately from admission to a category of RSC membership. Candidates need to be MRSC or FRSC and demonstrate development of specific professional attributes and be in a job which requires their chemical knowledge and skills.
- CSci: Chartered Scientist The RSC is a licensed by the Science Council for the registration of Chartered Scientists.
- EurChem: European Chemist The RSC is a member of the European Communities Chemistry Council (ECCC), and can award this designation to Chartered Chemists.
- MChemA: Mastership in Chemical Analysis The RSC awards this postgraduate qualification which is the UK statutory qualification for practice as a Public Analyst. It requires candidates to submit a portfolio of suitable experience and to take theory papers and a one-day laboratory practical examination.

=== Graduate of the Royal Society of Chemistry ===
The qualification GRSC (Graduate of the Royal Society of Chemistry) was awarded from 1981 to 1995 for completion of college courses equivalent to an honours chemistry degree and validated by the RSC.

== Divisions and sections ==
The society is organised around nine divisions, based on subject areas, and local sections. There are thirty-five local sections covering the United Kingdom and Ireland. Divisions cover broad areas of chemistry but also contain many special interest groups for more specific areas.

- Analytical Division for analytical chemistry and promoting the original aims of the Society for Analytical Chemistry; 12 Subject Groups.
- Dalton Division, named after John Dalton, for inorganic chemistry; 6 Subject Groups.
- Education Division for chemical education; 4 Subject Groups.
- Faraday Division, named after Michael Faraday, for physical chemistry and promoting the original aims of the Faraday Society; 14 Subject Groups.
- Organic Division for organic chemistry; 6 Subject Groups.
- Chemical Biology Interface Division; 2 Subject Groups.
- Environment, Sustainability and Energy Division; 3 Subject Groups.
- Materials Chemistry Division; 4 Subject Groups.
- Industry and Technology Division; 13 Subject Groups.

== Publications ==
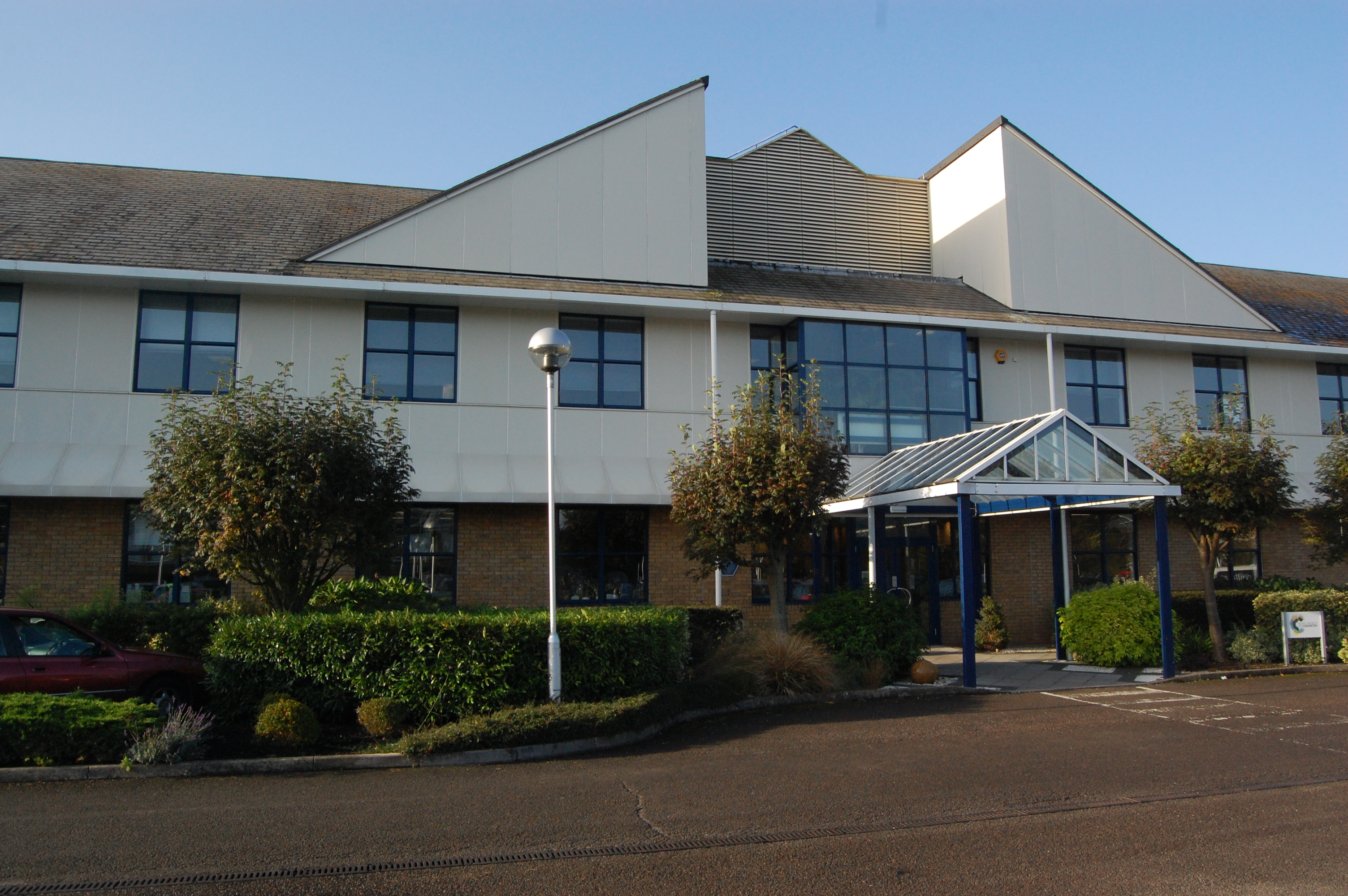
The RSC publications are operated from Thomas Graham House, Cambridge Science Park

The society is a not-for-profit publisher: surplus made by its publishing business is invested to support its aim of advancing the chemical sciences. Subscriptions to the journals are available individually, or "all-in", under a provision called "RSC Gold". In addition to scientific journals, including its flagship journals Chemical Communications, Chemical Science and Chemical Society Reviews, the society publishes:

- Education in Chemistry for teachers.
- A free online journal for chemistry educators, Chemistry Education Research and Practice.
- A general chemistry magazine Chemistry World, sent monthly to all members of the Society throughout the world. It was first published in January 2004, replacing Chemistry in Britain, which was first published in 1965. Its contents include news, articles of a general chemical nature, such as the history of chemistry and technological developments, book reviews and letters from readers. Its ISSN is 1473-7604.
- Professional reference books across the chemical sciences.
- Books for students, including the Tutorial Chemistry Texts series of 23 books, edited by E. W. Abel, and the 8 books in the Molecular World series, whose coordinating editor is L. E. Smart.
- Books on the history of chemistry, such as a history of the Faraday Society.

== Resources ==
The Interactive Lab Primer is a site developed to provide tips to a variety of chemical experimentation skills. The site covers basic lab safety tips, demonstrates primary lab techniques, introduces a couple common lab apparatus in lab, and provides other references. The society's ChemSpider is a database of chemicals and chemical properties. The society operates a blue plaque scheme, "Landmarks of Chemistry", erecting plaques at places associated with notable chemical events or people.

== Burlington House ==
Burlington House
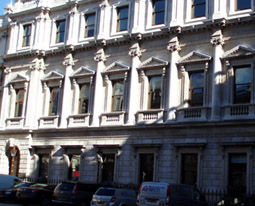
- Established: 2010
- Location: Piccadilly, London W1, England
- Website: www.rsc.org

The London offices of the Society are in Burlington House, Piccadilly. Events are hosted here for the public, RSC member groups and external organisations including regular lectures on the chemical sciences. The free lectures take an interesting look at the chemical aspects of a wide range of topics from curry to the enjoyment of music. The events have attracted notable science writers such as Philip Ball, Antony John Williams, and John Emsley to give public lectures. The society has a large library covering mainly chemistry-based subjects, including online access for members, housed at the Chemistry Centre at Burlington House. It is part of the Chemistry Centre and is a resource for RSC members.

=== History ===
The Royal Society of Chemistry has been resident at Burlington House since 1857 (at which time it was known as the Chemical Society) – at the heart of which is the RSC's Library and Information Centre which itself dates back to 1842. Over the years, the library for the RSC has received many gifts from notable fellows including Michael Faraday. The library became a centre for information on the chemical sciences during the World Wars when extensive use was made on the chemical reference material available.

== Benevolent fund ==
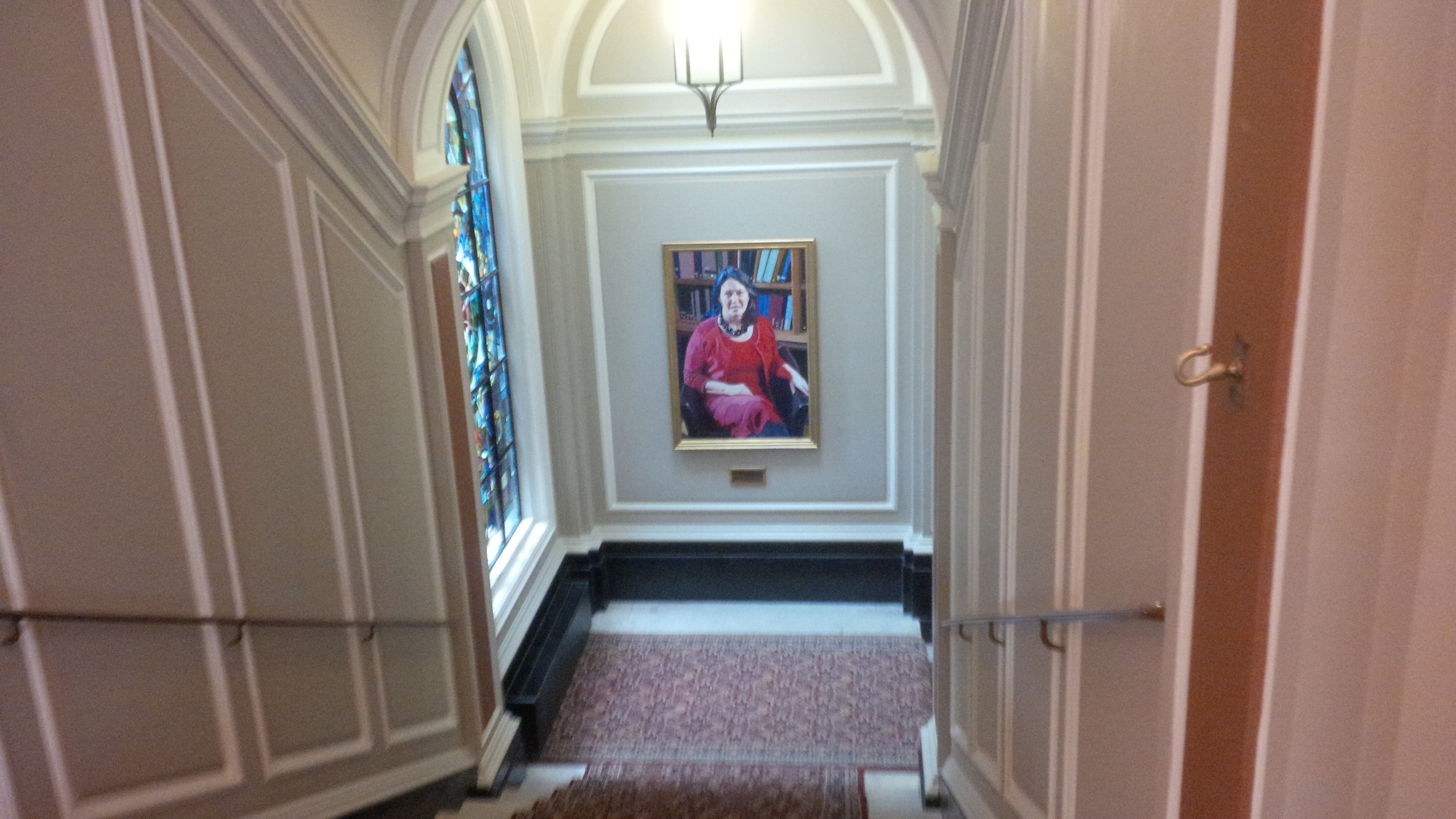
The staircase at the Royal Society of Chemistry, Burlington House, designed by the partnership of Robert Richardson Banks and Charles Barry, Jr.

The Chemists' Community Fund, the working name of the Royal Society of Chemistry's Benevolent Fund, supports the members and their families during difficult times, through advice and guidance, financial and volunteer support. It dates back to 1920 when the Institute of Chemistry (later the Royal Institute of Chemistry) established it as a memorial to its members who died in the First World War. It had an aim "to help necessitous persons who are, or have been, Fellows or Associates of the Institute, their wives or children, and the widows and dependent relatives of deceased Fellows and Associates" through voluntary contributions from members. The Fund's ethos of "members helping members" stems from the Institute of Chemistry's Council raising money for members in need from other members prior to the fund being formed.

In 1960, the benevolent fund introduced a volunteer visitor system, where members were asked to visit applicants, beneficiaries, elderly and housebound members in their area. Each local section was also appointed a fund representative. A major review of the fund to modernize it took place in 2003–2004, forming a new strategy document that is updated every three years. It underwent another review in 2014 with the aim to widen its reach to include the prevention of poverty and provide a more holistic support wider than financial assistance to Royal Society of Chemistry members and their families. The Benevolent Fund Grants Committee, formed of volunteer members of the Royal Society of Chemistry, oversees the fund and meets every three months.

== Prizes and awards ==
The RSC awards a variety of prizes and awards each year that include awards for excellence in any area of chemistry, in specialist areas or for achievement at particular stages of a chemist's career. Medals are awarded centrally by the RSC and by the divisions of the organisation. There are also awards that are administered by RSC interest groups. The centrally awarded medals include the Harrison–Meldola Memorial Prizes which are awarded to a British chemist who is under 32 years of age for promising original investigations in chemistry and the Corday–Morgan medals which consist of three separate awards made for the most meritorious contributions to experimental chemistry (including computer simulation). The Tilden Prize, previously known as the Tilden Lecture, consists of three awards annually to scientists in mid-career for advances in chemistry.

Previous winners of the Harrison–Meldola Prize (known as the Meldola Medal and Prize prior to its merger in 2008 with the Edward Harrison prize) include Christopher Kelk Ingold (1921, 1922), Cyril Norman Hinshelwood (1923), R.H. Stokes (1946), D.H. Williams (1966), and J. Evans (1978). Corday–Morgan medal recipients include Derek Barton (1949), Ronald Sydney Nyholm (1950), Frederick Sanger (1951), John Cornforth (1953), Rex Richards (1954), and George Porter (1955). The Faraday Division annually awards the Marlow Award for contributions to physical chemistry or chemical physics by members of the Faraday Division under the age of 32. Recent recipients include Andrew Orr-Ewing, (1999), Jonathan A. Jones, (2000), Helen Fielding (2001), Jonathan Essex (2002), Daren Caruana (2003), Jonathan Reid (2004), Julie Macpherson (2005), Fred Manby (2006), and Alessandro Troisi (2007).

== Twitter Conference ==
The RSC operates an annual Twitter conference. The event is held entirely online over 24 hours. The aim of its unique format is to remove the environmental and financial costs of attending a traditional scientific conference, and help researchers share their work and network across disciplines, wherever they are in the world.

== See also ==
- List of learned societies
- List of international professional associations
