= Annette Doherty =

British chemist

Annette Marian Doherty OBE FRSC
- Education: Imperial College London
- Scientific career
- Workplaces: Pfizer; GSK Plc; Ohio State University
- Thesis: Synthetic approaches to ionophore antibiotics (1985)

Annette Marian Doherty is a British chemist who is President of the Royal Society of Chemistry. She was a leader in the pharmaceutical sector, where she focussed on new drugs for cancer and respiratory diseases. She has served as Chair of various NHS trusts and academies. She was appointed an Order of the British Empire for services to the pharmaceutical sector in 2009.

== Early life and education ==
Doherty trained in chemistry at Imperial College London. She was at Imperial for undergraduate and graduate studies, before moving to Ohio State University as a NATO research fellow. Her doctoral research investigated ionophore antibiotics. She joined the Royal Society of Chemistry as a student, and has said that she understood the value it can add to people at all stages of their chemistry careers.

== Career ==
Doherty spent thirty-five years in the pharmaceutical industry. She was interested in the development of new diseases for respiratory, infectious and inflammatory conditions, as well as many cancers. She worked at Warner–Lambert and GSK. At GSK, she was Head of Product Development and Clinical Supply. In 2012, she moved to Pfizer, where she held similar leadership positions in drug development. Doherty is a Senior Advisor at Frazier Life Sciences, who design and develop new therapeutics. In 2009, she was appointed an Order of the British Empire for services to the pharmaceutical sector. She became a trustee of the Royal Society of Chemistry in 2011.

Alongside the design of new medicines, Doherty is passionate about health and quality of life. She joined the Cambridge University Hospitals NHS Foundation Trust in 2017, where she serves as non-executive director. She was made an Honorary Fellow of the British Pharmacological Society in 2023. In May 2024 she was made Chair of Maidstone and Tunbridge Wells NHS Trust, where she spent one year before moving to East Kent Hospitals University NHS Foundation Trust.

Doherty was elected President of the Royal Society of Chemistry in 2024. She has said that she wants to improve participation and sense of belonging in chemistry, advocate for innovation and research, and focus chemists' effort on environmental sustainability.

Doherty is part of the Tonbridge Grammar School Trust, and serves on the council of Innovate UK.

== Selected publications ==
- W. C. Patt; H. W. Hamilton; M. D. Taylor; et al. (1 July 1992). "Structure-activity relationships of a series of 2-amino-4-thiazole-containing renin inhibitors". Journal of Medicinal Chemistry. 35 (14): 2562–2572. doi:10.1021/jm00092a006. ISSN 0022-2623. PMID 1635057. Wikidata Q41970660.
- David W. Fry; Alexander J. Bridges; William A. Denny; et al. (29 September 1998). "Specific, irreversible inactivation of the epidermal growth factor receptor and erbB2, by a new class of tyrosine kinase inhibitor". Proceedings of the National Academy of Sciences of the United States of America. 95 (20): 12022–7. Bibcode:1998PNAS...9512022F. doi:10.1073/pnas.95.20.12022. ISSN 0027-8424. PMC 21758. PMID 9751783. Wikidata Q28368986.
- Stephen D Barrett; Alexander J Bridges; David T Dudley; et al. (15 October 2008). "The discovery of the benzhydroxamate MEK inhibitors CI-1040 and PD 0325901". Bioorganic & Medicinal Chemistry Letters. 18 (24): 6501–6504. doi:10.1016/j.bmcl.2008.10.054. ISSN 0960-894X. PMID 18952427. Wikidata Q34014364.
