= Chemistry education =

Study of the teaching and learning of chemistry

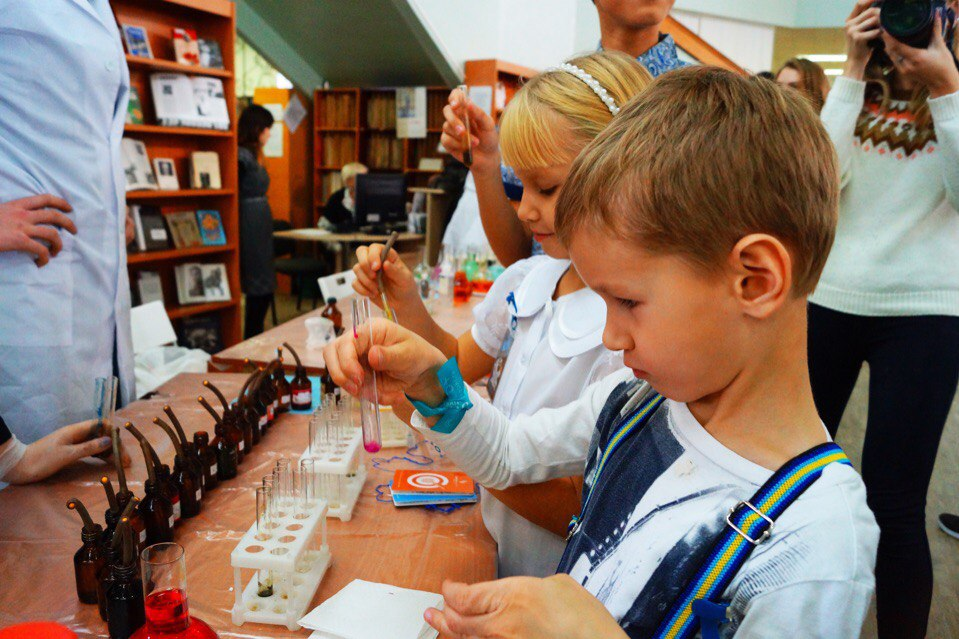
Children mix chemicals in test tubes as part of a hands-on chemistry education program in Samara, Russia.

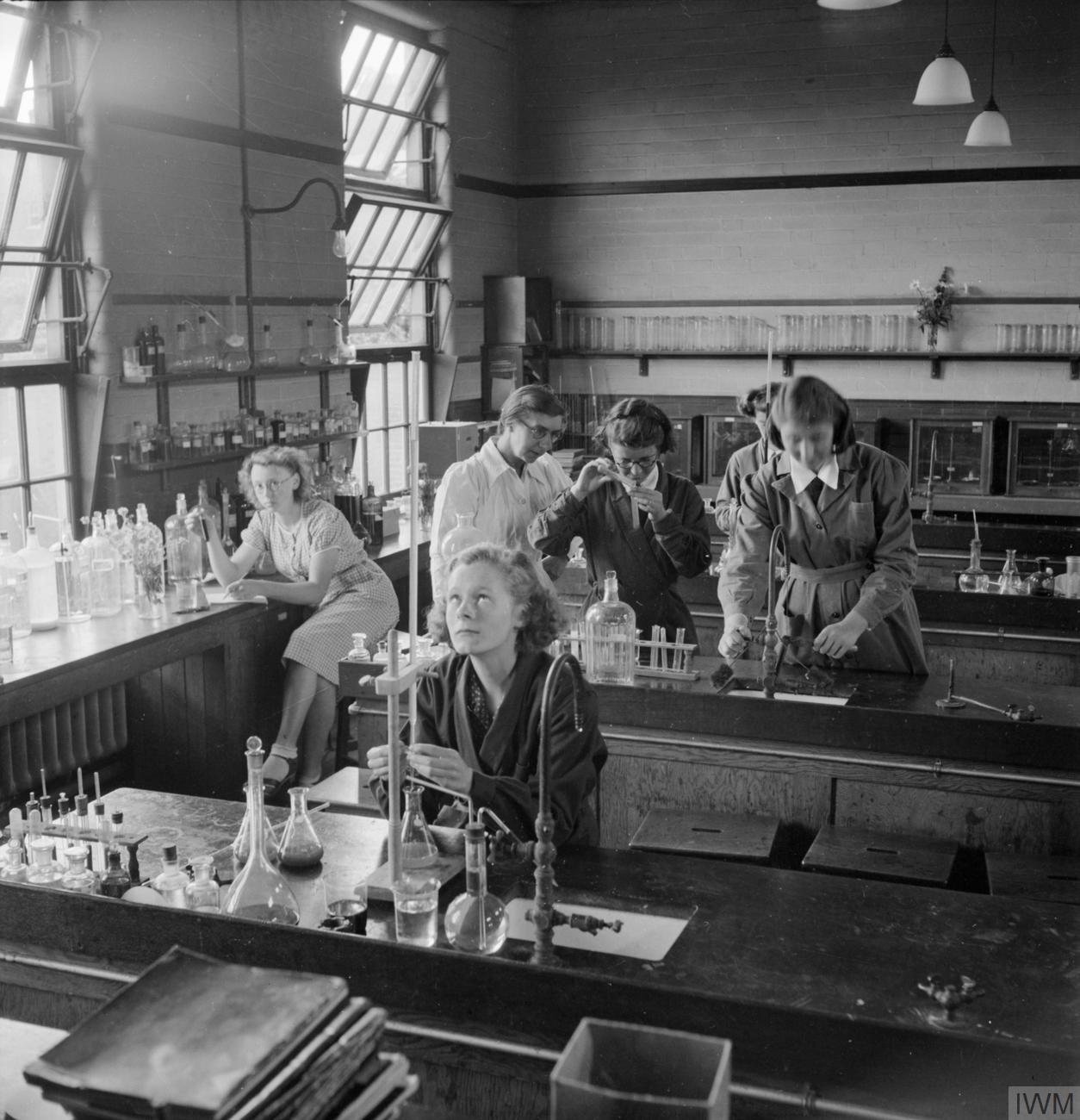
Pupils in a laboratory classroom, Reading, England (1945)

Chemistry education (or chemical education) is the study of teaching and learning chemistry. It is one subset of STEM education or discipline-based education research (DBER). Topics in chemistry education include understanding how students learn chemistry and determining the most efficient methods to teach chemistry. There is a constant need to improve chemistry curricula and learning outcomes based on findings of chemistry education research (CER). Chemistry education can be improved by changing teaching methods and providing appropriate training to chemistry instructors, within many modes, including classroom lectures, demonstrations, and laboratory activities.

== Importance ==
Chemistry education is important because the field of chemistry is fundamental to our world. The universe is subject to the laws of chemistry, while human beings depend on the orderly progress of chemical reactions within their bodies. Described as the central science, chemistry connects physical sciences with the life sciences and applied sciences. Chemistry has applications in food, medicine, industry, the environment, and other areas. Learning chemistry allows students to learn about the scientific method and gain skills in critical thinking, deductive reasoning, problem-solving, and communication. Teaching chemistry to students at a young age can increase student interest in STEM careers. Chemistry also provides students with many transferable skills that can be applied to any career.

== Teaching strategies ==
The most common method of teaching chemistry is lecture with a laboratory component. Laboratory courses became a central part of the chemistry curriculum towards the end of the 19th century. The German scientist Justus von Liebig plays a major role in shifting the model of lecture with demonstrations to one that includes a laboratory component. Liebig was one of the first chemists to conduct a laboratory and his methodology became widespread in the United States due to the efforts of Eben Horsford and Charles W. Eliot. After working in Liebig's laboratory, Horsford returned to the United States and helped establish the Lawrence Scientific School at Harvard University. The school was modeled after Liebig's methodology and established the first chemistry laboratory course. Two years later, Charles W. Eliot started to volunteer at the laboratory. Eliot's interests in the laboratory grew, and he eventually took charge of it. Eliot was later elected as Harvard's president in 1869. Eliot also served other powerful roles in education, which allowed him to influence the widespread adoption of laboratory methods. Today, the American Chemical Society on Professional Training requires students to gain 400 hours of laboratory experience, outside of introductory chemistry, to get a bachelor's degree. Similarly, the Royal Society of Chemistry requires students to gain 300 hours of laboratory experience to get a bachelor's degree.

However, since the twenty-first century, the role of laboratory courses in the chemistry curriculum has been questioned in major journals. The main argument against laboratory courses is that there is little evidence for their impact on student learning. Researchers are asking questions such as "why do we have laboratory work in the curriculum? What is distinctive about laboratory work that cannot be met elsewhere in the curriculum?" Researchers are asking for evidence that the investment of space, time and resources in chemistry laboratories provides value to student learning.

== Theories of education ==
There are several different philosophical perspectives that describe how the work in chemistry education is carried out.

=== Practitioner's Perspective ===
The first is what one might call a practitioner's perspective, wherein the individuals who are responsible for teaching chemistry (teachers, instructors, professors) are the ones who ultimately define chemistry education by their actions.

=== Perspective of chemical educators ===
A second perspective is defined by a self-identified group of chemical educators, faculty members and instructors who, as opposed to declaring their primary interest in a typical area of laboratory research (organic, inorganic, biochemistry, etc.), take on an interest in contributing suggestions, essays, observations, and other descriptive reports of practice into the public domain, through journal publications, books, and presentations. Dr. Robert L. Lichter, then-Executive Director of the Camille and Henry Dreyfus Foundation, speaking in a plenary session at the 16th Biennial Conference on Chemical Education (recent BCCE meetings: ,), posed the question of why do terms like 'chemical educator' even exist in higher education, when there is a perfectly respectable term for this activity, namely, 'chemistry professor.' One criticism of this view is that few professors bring any formal preparation in or background about education to their jobs, and so lack any professional perspective on the teaching and learning enterprise, particularly discoveries made about effective teaching and how students learn.

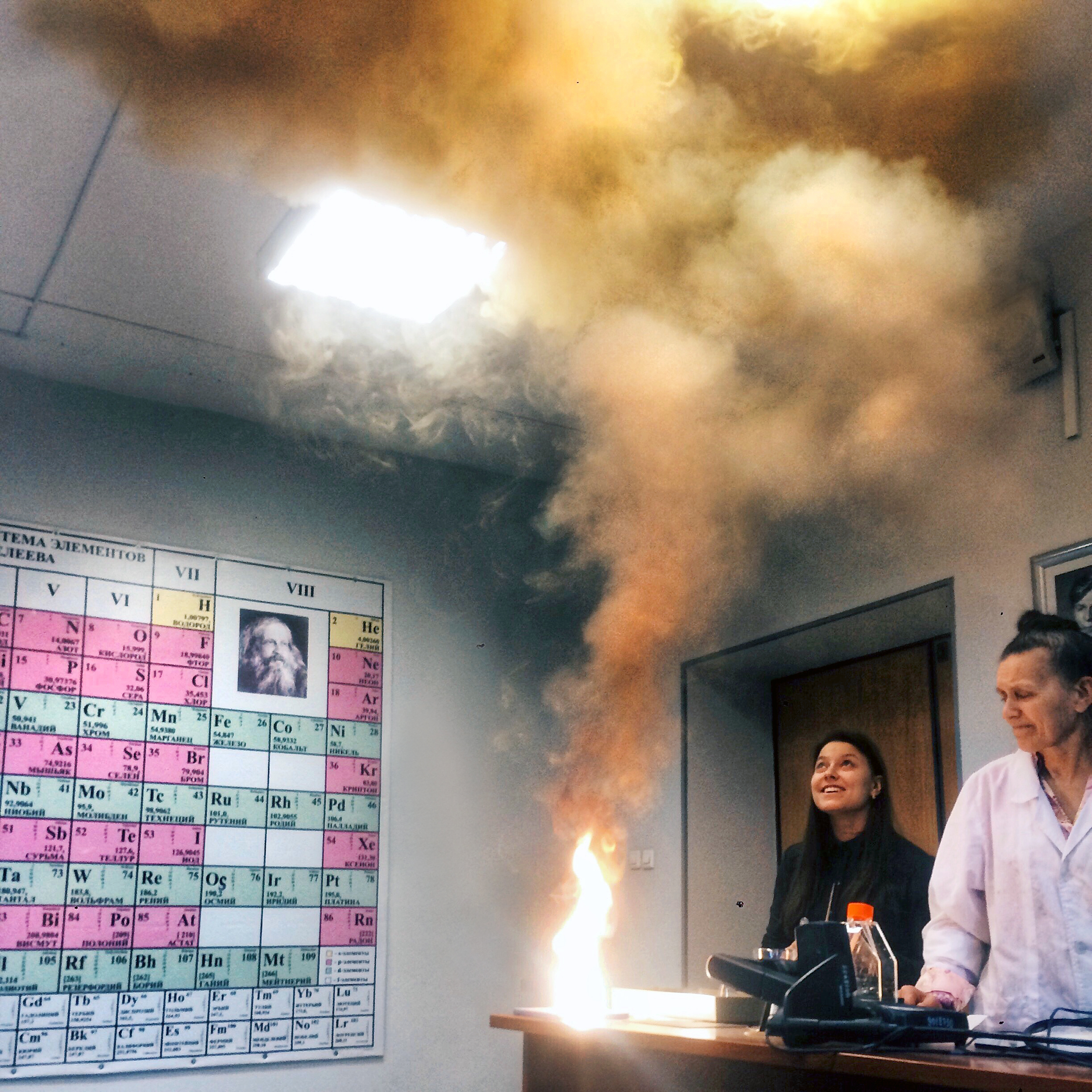
Demonstration in a chemistry class

=== Chemistry education research (CER) ===
A third perspective is chemistry education research (CER). CER is a type of discipline-based education research (DBER) focusing on the teaching and learning of chemistry. An overarching goal for chemistry education researchers is to help students develop 'expert-like' (coherent and useful) knowledge of chemistry. Thus, the field of CER involves investigating:

- how students construct their understanding of chemical phenomena and develop practical skills relevant to the discipline;
- how CER findings can inform curriculum design, e.g. by suggesting certain learning objectives and instructional approaches;

and developing instruments to measure the above.

Following the example of physics education research (PER), CER tends to take the theories and methods developed in pre-college science education research, which generally takes place in Schools of Education, and applies them to understanding comparable problems in post-secondary settings (in addition to pre-college settings). Like science education researchers, CER practitioners tend to study the teaching practices of others as opposed to focusing on their own classroom practices. Chemistry education research is typically carried out in situ using human subjects from secondary and post-secondary schools. Chemistry education research utilizes both quantitative and qualitative data collection methods. Quantitative methods typically involve collecting data that can then be analyzed using various statistical methods. Qualitative methods include interviews, observations, document analysis, journaling, and other methods common to social science research.

=== The Scholarship of Teaching and Learning (SoTL) ===
There is also an emergent perspective called The Scholarship of Teaching and Learning (SoTL). Although there is debate on how to best define SoTL, one of the primary practices is for mainstream faculty members (organic, inorganic, biochemistry, etc.) to develop a more informed view of their practices, how to carry out research and reflection on their own teaching, and about what constitutes deep understanding in student learning.

=== Systems thinking approach ===
In 2017, the Systems Thinking Into Chemistry Education (STICE) project proposed a systems thinking approach for (post)-secondary education in general chemistry education. Chemistry education has largely relied on a reductionist approach, which involves studying a complex topic as the sum of its parts. A reductionist approach is beneficial in increasing our knowledge of the natural world, however, it is insufficient in tackling global issues—sustainability, climate change, pollution, poverty, etc. Due to the limitations of a reductionist approach, researchers are suggesting a complementary systems thinking approach in chemistry education. A systems thinking approach involves learning concepts with a holistic perspective, allowing chemistry students to think critically about how chemistry relates to larger, societal issues. Researchers believe that a reductionist approach, complemented by a systems thinking approach, can produce global-minded chemists.

== Academic journals ==
Several journals publish papers related to chemistry education. Some journals focus on particular education levels (schools vs. universities) while others cover all education levels. Journal articles range from reports on classroom and laboratory practices to educational research.

- Australian Journal of Education in Chemistry: Published by the Royal Australian Chemical Institute. Covers both school and university education.
- Chemical Education Journal (CEJ): Covers all areas of chemical education.
- Chemistry Education Research and Practice (CERP): Published by the Royal Society of Chemistry (RSC). Publishes theoretical perspectives, literature reviews, and empirical papers, including systematic evaluations of innovative practice.
- Education in Chemistry (EiC): Published by the Royal Society of Chemistry. Covers all areas of chemical education. (EiC is the RSC's educational magazine, whereas CERP is a peer-reviewed research journal).
- Foundations of Chemistry (FOCH): Published by Springer. Covers philosophical and historical aspects of chemical education.
- Journal of Chemical Education: Published by the Chemical Education Division of the American Chemical Society. Covers both school and university education.
- The Chemical Educator: Published by Springer-Verlag from 1996 to 2002. Covers all areas of chemical education.
- List of scientific journals in chemistry

Research in chemistry education is also published in journals in the wider science education field.

== Degrees offered in chemistry ==
The U.S. offers chemistry education degrees at the undergraduate and graduate levels. The following degrees are offered:

- Bachelor of Science in Chemistry Education
- Master of Science in Chemistry Education
- PhD in Chemistry Education

Additionally, colleges and universities offer chemistry degrees with a specialization in chemistry education. Some examples are:

- Bachelor of Science in Chemistry with Specialization in Chemical Education - University of Virginia
- Masters of Art in Chemistry with an Emphasis in Chemical Education - University of California Santa Barbara
- A compendium of graduate programs in chemistry that award M.S. and Ph.D. degrees for research on teaching and learning of chemistry can be found at https://sites.google.com/miamioh.edu/bretzsl/cer-resources/cer-graduate-programs

Undergraduate students who are interested in chemistry can major in the following areas:

- Chemistry
- Chemical engineering
- Biochemistry
- Environmental Chemistry
- Analytical chemistry
- Forensic Chemistry

== See also ==
- Advancing Chemistry by Enhancing Learning in the Laboratory
- Constructivism in science education
