= List of chemists =

This is a list of chemists. It should include those who have been important to the development or practice of chemistry. Their research or application has made significant contributions in the area of basic or applied chemistry.

== A ==
=== Ab–An ===
- Richard Abegg (1869–1910), German chemist, pioneer of valence theory
- Frederick Abel (1827–1902), English chemist, inventor of cordite
- Friedrich Accum (1769–1838), German chemist, advances in the field of gas lighting
- Homer Burton Adkins (1892–1949), American chemist, known for work in hydrogenation of organic compounds
- Peter Agre (born 1949), American chemist and doctor, known for aquaporin water channels, 2003 Nobel Prize in Chemistry
- Georgius Agricola (1494–1555), German scholar known as "the father of mineralogy"
- Natalie Ahn (PhD 1985), American chemist working on mechanisms of cell signaling
- Arthur Aikin (1773–1855), English chemist and mineralogist, a founding member of the Chemical Society
- Adrien Albert (1907–1989), Australian medicinal chemist who studied the links between physico-chemical properties and biological effect of drugs
- John Albery (1936–2013), English physical chemist who studied electrochemistry, proton transfer and isotope effects
- Kurt Alder (1902–1958), German chemist known for the Diels–Alder reaction, 1950 Nobel Prize in Chemistry
- Jerome Alexander (1876–1959), American expert on the chemistry of colloids
- Ivan Alimarin (1903-1989), Soviet chemist, one of the leaders of analytical chemistry in 20's century
- Elmer Lucille Allen (born 1931), American chemist and ceramic artist
- Heather C. Allen (born 1960), American chemist who works on interfacial phenomena
- Adah Almutairi (born 1976), American chemist known for nanomedicine and nanotechnology
- Sidney Altman (1939–2022), Canadian-American biologist known for catalytic RNA, 1989 Nobel Prize in Chemistry
- Faiza Al-Kharafi (born 1946), Kuwaiti chemist, academic and the first woman to head a major university in the Middle East
- Lisa Alvarez-Cohen (PhD 1991), American chemist concerned with microbial degradation of environmental contaminants

=== An–Av ===
- Gloria Long Anderson (born 1938), American chemist, pioneer of nuclear magnetic resonance spectroscopy
- Christian B. Anfinsen (1916–1995), American chemist known for work on ribonuclease, 1972 Nobel Prize in Chemistry
- Andrea Angel (1877–1917), English chemist known for work on explosives
- Angelo Angeli (1864–1931), Italian chemist who studied nitrogen compounds such as hydrazoic acid
- Octavio Augusto Ceva Antunes (died 2009), Brazilian chemist, consultant for the production of anti-HIV drugs
- Anthony Joseph Arduengo, III (born 1952), American chemist known for chemical compounds with unusual valency
- Johan August Arfwedson (1792–1841), Swedish chemist who discovered lithium
- Anton Eduard van Arkel (1893–1976), Dutch chemist who developed a method for preparing pure titanium and other metals
- Svante Arrhenius (1859–1927), Swedish chemist, one of the founders of physical chemistry, he used physical chemistry to estimate the effect of atmospheric carbon dioxide the Earth's increasing surface temperature; Nobel Prize in Chemistry, 1903
- Valerie Ashby (born 1965/1966), American chemist known for work on functionalized diene monomers and polymers
- Barbara Askins (born 1939), American chemist known for inventing a method to enhance underexposed photographic negatives
- Larned B. Asprey (1919–2005), American nuclear chemist known for actinide, lanthanide, rare-earth and fluorine chemistry
- Alán Aspuru-Guzik (born 1976), Mexican computational chemist known for variational quantum eigensolver
- Francis William Aston (1877–1945), British chemist and physicist known for mass spectroscopy, 1922 Nobel Prize in Chemistry
- Bengt Aurivillius (1918–1994), Swedish chemist known for his research in metal and mixed oxides.
- Karin Aurivillius (1920–1982), Swedish chemist who determined the crystal structures of many mercury compounds
- Svetlana Mikhailovna Avaeva (1926–2017), Soviet and Russian biochemist known for research on inorganic pyrophosphatases and biological catalysis, recipient of the USSR State Prize (1984).
- Amedeo Avogadro (1776–1856), Italian chemist and physicist, discovered Avogadro's law as a copmponent of noted for his contribution to molecular theory

== B ==
=== Bab–Bar ===
- Stephen Moulton Babcock (1843–1931), American agricultural chemist worked on the "single-grain experiment"
- Myrtle Bachelder (1908–1997), American chemist noted for work on the Manhattan Project atomic bomb, and for work on metal chemistry
- Werner Emmanuel Bachmann (1901–1951), American chemist, known for work in steroids and RDX
- Simone Badal-McCreath (21st century), Jamaican chemist who created prostate and breast cancer cell lines
- Leo Baekeland (1863–1944), Belgian-American chemist known for invention of bakelite
- Adolf von Baeyer (1835–1917), German chemist, 1905 Nobel Prize in Chemistry, synthesis of indigo
- Piero Baglioni (born 1952), Italian chemist known for inorganic and organic colloids
- Hendrik Willem Bakhuis Roozeboom (1854–1907), Dutch chemist who studied phase behaviour in physical chemistry
- Alice Ball (1892–1916), American chemist known for inventing an effective injectable treatment for leprosy
- Emily Balskus (born 1980), American chemist and microbiologist known for work on the human microbiome
- Zhenan Bao (born 1970), Chinese chemist known for developing technologies with organic field-effect transistors and organic semiconductors
- Phil S. Baran (born 1977), American chemist known for synthesis, novel reactions and reagents
- Coral Barbas (PhD 1989), Spanish chemist known for research on metabolomics and integration of chemical data
- Allen J. Bard (1933–2024), American chemist known for development of the scanning electrochemical microscope, Wolf Prize in Chemistry
- Vincenzo Barone (born 1952), Italian chemist working in theoretical and computational chemistry
- Denise Barthomeuf (1934-2004), French chemist working on zeolites
- Neil Bartlett (1932–2008), English/Canadian/American chemist known for creating the first noble-gas compound
- Sir Derek Barton (1918–1998), 1969 Nobel Prize in Chemistry for “contributions to the development of the concept of conformation and its application in chemistry"

=== Bas–Ben ===
- Fred Basolo (1920–2007), American chemist known for the mechanisms of inorganic reactions
- Esther Batchelder (1897–1987), American chemist, educator and specialist in nutrition
- Sir Alan Battersby (1925–2018), English organic chemist known for work on biosynthetic pathways
- Antoine Baumé (1728–1804), French chemist, inventor of the Baumé scale hydrometer for measuring the density of liquids
- Karl Bayer (1847–1904), Austrian chemist who invented the Bayer process of extracting alumina from bauxite
- Johann Joachim Becher (1635–1682), German who developed the phlogiston theory of combustion
- Friedrich Konrad Beilstein (1838–1906), German-Russian chemist, created Beilstein database
- Joseph Achille Le Bel (1847–1930), French chemist, early work in stereochemistry addressing the relationship between molecular structure and optical activity
- Angela Belcher (PhD 1997), American chemist, materials scientist, and biological engineer
- Irina Beletskaya (born 1933), Russian organometallic chemist known for studies on aromatic reaction mechanisms
- R. P. (Ronnie) Bell (1907–1996), English physical chemist known in particular for The Proton in Chemistry
- Andrey Belozersky (1905–1972), Soviet biologist and biochemist, pioneer of molecular biology and the chemistry of nucelic acids
- Ruth R. Benerito (1916–2013), American chemist known for inventions relating to textiles, including wash-and-wear cotton fabrics

=== Ber–Bla ===
- Paul Berg (1926–2023), American biochemist known for research on nucleic acids, especially recombinant DNA, 1980 Nobel Prize in Chemistry
- Friedrich Bergius (1884–1949), German chemist known for known for production of synthetic fuel from coal, 1931 Nobel Prize in Chemistry
- Helen M. Berman (born 1943), American chemist who worked on structural analysis of protein-nucleic acid complexes
- Marcellin Berthelot (1827–1907), French chemist, a prominent anti-vitalist who synthesized many organic compounds from inorganic substances, and developed thermochemistry
- Claude Louis Berthollet (1748–1822), French chemist who developed the theory of chemical equilibria
- Carolyn R. Bertozzi (born 1966) American chemist who studies chemical reactions compatible with living systems ("bioorthogonal chemistry"), 2022 Nobel Prize in Chemistry
- Guy Bertrand (born 1952) French chemist working on carbenes, nitrenes, phosphinidenes, radicals and biradicals
- Jöns Jakob Berzelius (1779–1848), Swedish chemist who discovered several elements
- Johannes Martin Bijvoet (1892–1980), Dutch chemist and crystallographer who determined the absolute configuration of sodium rubidium tartrate
- Leonora Bilger (1893–1975), American chemist who studied nitrogenous compounds
- Katherine Bitting (1869–1937), Canadian and American food chemist for the United States Department of Agriculture and the National Canners Association
- Joseph Black (1728–1799), British chemist known for discoveries of magnesium, latent heat, specific heat, and carbon dioxide

=== Blo–Bou ===
- Katharine Burr Blodgett (1898–1979), American surface chemist and physicist and inventor of nonreflective glass
- Suzanne Blum (born 1978), American chemist developing single-molecule and single-particle fluorescence microscopy
- Katharine Blunt (1876–1954), American chemist and nutritionist focusing on home economics, food chemistry and nutrition
- Herman Boerhaave (1668–1738) Dutch chemist, botanist, Christian humanist & physician, first to isolate urea from urine
- Kristie Boering (born 1963), American chemist and planetary scientist studying atmospheric chemistry and mass transport in the extraterrestrial atmosphere
- Alexei Bogdanov (born 1935), Soviet and Russian biochemist and molecular biologist known for fundamental contributions to ribosome structure and function, nucleic acid-protein interactions, and protein biosynthesis mechanisms.
- Olga Bogdanova (1896–1982), Soviet chemist who specialized in organic catalysis
- Dale L. Boger (born 1953), American chemist working on natural product synthesis, synthetic methodology, medicinal chemistry, and combinatorial chemistry
- Paul Emile Lecoq de Boisbaudran (1838–1912), French chemist who discovered gallium, samarium and dysprosium
- Jan Boldingh (1915–2003), Dutch chemist known for new analytic techniques such as gas-chromatography and others
- Alexander Borodin (1833–1887), Russian chemist and composer. As a chemist he is known best for his work on organic synthesis, including discovery of the aldol reaction
- Hans-Joachim Born (1909–1987), German radiochemist who participated in the Soviet nuclear weapons programme
- Carl Bosch (1872–1940), German chemist, pioneer in the field of high-pressure industrial chemistry. Nobel Prize in Chemistry 1931
- Octave Leopold Boudouard (1872–1923), French chemist who discovered the Boudouard reaction: combination of carbon and carbon dioxide to form carbon monoxide at high temperatures
- Jean-Baptiste Boussingault (1802–1887), French chemist with work in agricultural science, petroleum science and metallurgy

=== Bow–Bro ===
- E. J. Bowen (1898–1980), English physical chemist known for research into fluorescence
- Humphry Bowen (1929–2001), English analytical chemist known for radioisotopes and trace elements
- Paul D. Boyer (1918–2018), American biochemist known for studying the biosynthesis of adenosine triphosphate (ATP), 1997 Nobel Prize in Chemistry
- Robert Boyle (1627–1691), Irish-English pioneer of modern chemistry, best known for Boyle's law
- Henri Braconnot (1780–1855), French chemist who worked on plant chemistry and discovered chitin and pectin
- Henning Brand (c. 1630–c.1692 or c. 1710), German alchemist, who accidentally discovered phosphorus while searching for the "philosopher's stone"
- Mary Bidwell Breed (1870–1949), American chemist focusing on aromatic acids and the atomic mass of palladium
- Ronald Breslow (1931–2017), American organic chemist who designed and synthesized new molecules with interesting properties, such as the cyclopropenyl cation
- Alan Brisdon (21st century), British chemist known for Inorganic Spectroscopic Methods
- Johannes Nicolaus Brønsted (1879–1947), Danish chemist known for work on reaction kinetics, especially acid–base reactions
- Herbert C. Brown (1912–2004), American chemist known for work on organoboranes, 1979 Nobel Prize in Chemistry
- Jeannette Brown (born 1934), American organic medicinal chemist, historian, and author, known for research on drug development targeting tuberculosis and coccidiosis
- Jeanette Grasselli Brown (1928–2025), American analytical chemist and spectroscopist
- Rachel Fuller Brown (1898–1980), American chemist who co-developed the first useful antifungal antibiotic, nystatin

=== Buc–But ===
- Eduard Buchner (1860–1917), German chemist who sounded the death knell of vitalism by discovering cell-free fermentation, 1907 Nobel Prize in Chemistry
- Stephen L. Buchwald (born 1955), American organic chemist, co-discoverer of palladium-catalyzed C–N bond formation Buchwald–Hartwig amination
- Mary Van Rensselaer Buell (1893–1969), American chemist who worked on nucleic acids and nucleotides, the relation of hormones to the metabolism of carbohydrates, and other topics in biochemistry
- Kathryn Bullock (1945–2021), American chemist who co-developed valve-regulated lead-acid batteries
- Robert Wilhelm Bunsen (1811–1899), German inventor, chemist, discovered the elements caesium and rubidium with Gustav Kirchhoff and invented the Bunsen burner
- Jeanne Burbank (1915–2002), American chemist who developed lead-acid and silver-zinc batteries for submarines at the United States Naval Research Laboratory
- Stephanie Burns (born 1955), American organosilicon chemist and past honorary president of Society of Chemical Industry
- William Merriam Burton (1865–1954), American chemist, developed the first thermal cracking process for crude oil
- Adolf Butenandt (1903–1995), German biochemist, 1939 Nobel Prize in Chemistry for "work on sex hormones"
- Alison Butler (PhD 1982), American bioinorganic chemist and metallobiochemist
- Aleksandr Butlerov (1828–1886), Russian chemist, one of the creators of the theory of chemical structure, who discovered the formose reaction

== C ==
=== Ca ===
- Mary Letitia Caldwell (1890–1972), American chemist who developed a method for purifying crystalline porcine pancreatic amylase
- Melvin Calvin (1911–1997), American chemist, winner of 1961 Nobel Prize in Chemistry
- Allison A. Campbell (born 1963), American chemist studying biomineralization, biomimetics and biomaterials
- Constantin Cândea (1887–1971), Romanian analytical chemist who studied methods of separating metals
- Stanislao Cannizzaro (1826–1910), Italian chemist, postulated the Cannizzaro reaction
- María Luz Cárdenas (born 1944). Chilean-French enzymologist known for work on mammalian hexokinases.
- Heinrich Caro (1834–1910), German chemist who developed a synthesis for aniline red and other dyes
- Wallace Carothers (1896–1937), American chemist, known for the discovery of nylon
- Emma P. Carr (1880–1972), American chemist known for work on unsaturated hydrocarbons and absorption spectra
- Marjorie Constance Caserio (1929–2021), American chemist, known for Basic Principles of Organic Chemistry, winner of the Garvan Medal
- Martina Casiano y Mayor (1881–1958), Spanish chemist and teacher, first female member of the Spanish Society of Physics and Chemistry
- Marta Catellani (PhD 1971), Italian chemist working on palladium as a catalyst for multistep organic reactions, who discovered the Catellani reaction
- Henry Cavendish (1731–1810), British experimental and theoretical chemist and physicist noted for the discovery of hydrogen

=== Ce–Ci ===
- Thomas Cech (born 1947), American biochemist, 1989 Nobel Prize in Chemistry for discovery of catalytic RNA
- Martin Chalfie (born 1947), American scientist, 2008 Nobel Prize in Chemistry for the green fluorescent protein
- Christopher Chang (born 1974) American chemist known for molecular imaging sensors as applied to neuroscience and immunology, metal catalysts for renewable energy cycles, and green chemistry
- Michelle Chang (born 1977), American chemist known for work on biosynthesis of biofuels and pharmaceuticals
- Yves Chauvin (1930–2015), French chemist, 2005 Nobel Prize in Chemistry for deciphering the process of olefin metathesis
- Michel Eugėne Chevreul (1786–1889), French chemist, the first scientist to define the concept of a chemical compound and to formally characterize the nature of organic compounds
- Christine S. Chow (PhD 1992), American chemist who uses fluorescence spectroscopy and mass spectrometry to study drug-RNA interactions
- Aaron Ciechanover (born 1947), Israeli biologist, 2004 Nobel Prize in Chemistry for work on ubiquitination
- Giacomo Luigi Ciamician (1857–1922) Italian chemist, pioneer in photochemistry and green chemistry, and the earliest to anticipate artificial photosynthesis

=== Cl–Cor ===
- G. Marius Clore FRS (born 1955), American chemist, known for foundational work in three-dimensional protein and nucleic acid structure determination by nuclear magnetic resonance spectroscopy
- Edward L. Cochran (born 1929), American chemist, known for pioneering studies on the nature of free radicals
- Ernst Cohen (1869–1944 Auschwitz), Dutch chemist known for work on the allotropy of metals)
- Mildred Cohn (1913–2009), American chemist, a pioneer in the applying nuclear magnetic resonance to enzyme reactions, particularly reactions of adenosine triphosphate
- David Collison (PhD 1980), British chemist known for development of electron paramagnetic resonance spectroscopy
- Vicki Colvin (born 1965), American chemist known for work on the synthesis and characterization of nanomaterials
- James Bryant Conant (1893–1978), American organic chemist who explored the complex relationship between chemical equilibrium and the reaction rate of chemical processes, Priestley Medal 1944
- Elias James Corey (born 1928), American organic chemist, winner of the 1990 Nobel Prize in Chemistry for developing the theory and methodology of organic synthesis, specifically retrosynthetic analysis
- Robert Corey (1897–1971), American biochemist known for co-discovery of the α-helix and the β-sheet
- Carl Ferdinand Cori (1896–1984), Czech biochemist, Nobel Prize in physiology or medicine 1947 for discovering how glycogen is broken down and resynthesized
- Gerty Cori (1896–1957), American biochemist, Nobel Prize in physiology or medicine 1947 for discovering how glycogen is broken down and resynthesized
- John Cornforth (1917–2013), Australian-British chemist, 1975 Nobel Prize in Chemistry for work on the stereochemistry of enzyme-catalysed reactions
- Athel Cornish-Bowden (born 1943). British and French enzymologist known for enzyme kns, hexokinases, and metabolic control analysis
- Charles D. Coryell (1912–1971), American chemist who worked on hemoglobin structure and co-discovered the element promethium

=== Cot–Cz ===
- Frank Albert Cotton (1930–2007), American chemist known for research on transition metals and as coauthor of Advanced Inorganic Chemistry, 2000 Wolf Prize in Chemistry
- Charles Coulson (1910–1974), British theoretical chemist, pioneer of the application of quantum theory to problems of molecular structure
- Archibald Scott Couper (1831–1892), British chemist who developed the concept of tetravalent carbon atoms linking together to form large molecules
- James Crafts (1839–1917), American chemist, developer of Friedel–Crafts reaction for alkylation and acylation
- Donald J. Cram (1919–2001), American chemist, winner of the 1987 Nobel Prize in Chemistry for development of molecules with structure-specific interactions of high selectivity
- William Crookes (1832–1919), British chemist who discovered thallium, and was a pioneer of vacuum tubes
- Alexander Crum Brown (1838–1922), Scottish organic chemist who developed the concept of tetravalent carbon atoms linking together to form large molecules
- Paul J. Crutzen (1933–2021), Dutch chemist, winner of the 1995 Nobel Prize in Chemistry for work on atmospheric chemistry, especially in relation to ozone
- Ana Maria Cuervo (born 1966), Spanish-American physician, researcher, and cell biologist, best known for work on autophagy
- Marie Curie (1867–1934), Polish and French radiation physicist, discovered the elements radium and polonium, 1903 Nobel Prize in Physics, 1911 Nobel Prize in Chemistry
- Pierre Curie (1859–1906), French physicist and chemist, 1903 Nobel Prize in Physics for work on radioactivity
- Robert Curl (1933–2022), American chemist, winner of 1996 Nobel Prize in Chemistry for discovery of the fullerene class of materials
- Theodor Curtius (1857–1928), German chemist known for the Curtius rearrangement, and also discovery of diazoacetic acid, hydrazine and hydrazoic acid
- Anthony Czarnik (born 1957), American chemist and inventor known for work on fluorescent chemosensors
- Emil Czyrniański (1824–1888), Polish chemist, known for developing chemical nomenclature in Polish

== D ==
=== Da–Di ===
- Jeff Dahn (born 1957), Canadian materials chemist noted for significant contributions to lithium-ion batteries
- John Dalton (1766–1844), British chemist, physicist and meteorologist, whose work laid the foundations of modern atomic theory and stoichiometric chemistry
- Marie Maynard Daly (1921–2003), American biochemist who studied the chemistry of histones, protein synthesis, the relationships between cholesterol and hypertension, and uptake of creatine by muscle cells
- Carl Peter Henrik Dam (1895–1976), Danish biochemist, winner of the 1943 Nobel Prize in Physiology or Medicine for discovering vitamin K and its role in human physiology
- Samuel J. Danishefsky (born 1936), American organic chemist, natural product total synthesis, 1995/6 Wolf Prize in Chemistry
- Raymond Davis, Jr. (1914–2006), American physicist and chemist who won the 2002 Nobel Prize in Physics for detecting neutrinos emitted from the Sun
- Humphry Davy (1778–1829), British chemist, discovered several alkaline earth metals
- Serena DeBeer (born 1973), American chemist known for developing X-ray based spectroscopic probes of electronic structure
- Peter Debye (1884–1966), Dutch chemist who improved the theory of electrical conductivity in electrolyte solutions, winner of the 1936 Nobel Prize in Chemistry
- Johann Deisenhofer (born 1943), German biochemist who determined the three-dimensional structure of a protein complex found in photosynthetic bacteria, 1988 Nobel Prize in Chemistry
- Margarita del Val (born 1959), Spanish chemist, immunologist, and virologist, coordinator of the Salud Global ("Global Health") platform
- Nathalie Demassieux (1884–1961), French mineral chemist and academic who worked on the complex halogenated salts of lead
- Gautam Radhakrishna Desiraju (born 1952), Indian chemist known for work on crystal engineering and weak hydrogen bonds
- James Dewar (1842–1923), British chemist and physicist known for his invention of the vacuum flask and its usefor studying the liquefaction of gases
- François Diederich (1952–2020), Luxembourg chemist known for molecular recognition studies with biological receptors
- Otto Diels (1876–1954), German chemist, winner of the 1950 Nobel Prize in Chemistry for the Diels–Alder reaction, a method for cyclohexene synthesis
- Robert Dirks (1978–2015), American computational chemist known for work on DNA nanotechnology

=== Do–Dy ===
- Martha Doan (1872–1960), American chemist who studied thallium compounds
- William von Eggers Doering (1917–2011), American chemist known for the total synthesis of quinine
- Edward Doisy (1893–1986), American biochemist, winner of the 1943 Nobel Prize in Physiology or Medicine
- Davorin Dolar (1921–2005), Slovenian physical chemist who studied polyelectrolyte solutions, and is regarded as a founder of modern physical chemistry teaching in Slovenia
- Vy Maria Dong (born 1976), American chemist who studies enantioselective catalysis and natural product synthesis
- David Adriaan van Dorp (1915–1995), Dutch chemist known for the first full synthesis of vitamin A
- Israel Dostrovsky (1918–2010), Russian (Ukraine)-born Israeli physical chemist known for separating oxygen isotopes in water
- Herbert Henry Dow (1866–1930), American industrial chemist, known for bromine extraction
- Cornelius Drebbel (1572–1633), Dutch inventor, alchemist and chemist who contributed to develop measurement and control systems, optics and chemistry
- Jean Baptiste Dumas (1800–1884), French chemist, best known for the determination of atomic and molecular masses weights by measuring vapor densities
- Helen Dyer (1895–1998), American biochemist and early cancer researcher known for studies of carcinogenesis mechanisms

== E ==
- Sandra Eaton (PhD 1972), American chemist notable for work on electron paramagnetic resonance
- John Tileston Edsall (1902–2002), American protein chemist, and co-author of Proteins, Amino Acids and Peptides
- Eilaf Egap (21st century), American chemist who works on imaging techniques and biomaterials for early diagnostics and drug delivery
- Paul Ehrlich (1854–1915), German chemist, winner of the 1908 Nobel Prize in Physiology or Medicine for contributions to immunology
- Arthur Eichengrün (1867–1949), German chemist known for developing the anti-gonorrhea drug Protargol
- Manfred Eigen (1927–2019), German chemist, winner of the 1967 Nobel Prize in Chemistry for work on measuring fast chemical reactions
- Mostafa El-Sayed (born 1933), Egyptian-American physical chemist known for the El-Sayed rule in spectroscopy
- Fausto Elhuyar (1755–1833), Spanish chemist, the first to isolate tungsten
- Lorne Elias (PhD 1956), Canadian chemist, inventor of the explosives vapour detector EVD-1
- Gertrude B. Elion (1918–1999), American biochemist and recipient of the 1988 Nobel Prize in Physiology or Medicine for innovative methods of rational drug design
- Conrad Elvehjem (1901–1962), American biochemist who identified two vitamins, nicotinic acid (niacin) and nicotinamide
- Harry Julius Emeléus (1903–1993), British inorganic chemist known for work on fluorine chemistry
- Gladys Anderson Emerson (1903–1984), American chemist and early nutritionist, and the first person to isolate Vitamin E
- Emil Erlenmeyer (1825–1909), German chemist known for the early development of the theory of chemical structure and formulating the Erlenmeyer rule.
- Richard R. Ernst (1933–2021), Swiss physical chemist, 1991 Nobel Prize in Chemistry for the development of Fourier transform nuclear magnetic resonance spectroscopy
- Gerhard Ertl (born 1936), German physical chemist who laid the foundation of modern surface chemistry, 2007 Nobel prize in chemistry
- Margaret C. Etter (1943–1992), American chemist and developer of solid state chemistry for crystalline organic compounds
- Hans von Euler-Chelpin (1873–1964), Swedish chemist, winner of the 1929 Nobel Prize in Chemistry for work on the fermentation of sugar and enzymes
- Henry Eyring (1901–1981), Mexico-born American theoretical chemist known for the absolute rate theory of chemical reactions

== F ==
=== Fa–Fi ===
- Kazimierz Fajans (1887–1975), Polish-American physical chemist, who worked on radioactivity and co-discovered protactinium
- Michael Faraday (1791–1867), British chemist and physicist who discovered include the principles of electromagnetic induction, diamagnetism, and electrolysis
- Hermann von Fehling (1812–1885), German chemist who developed use of Fehling's solution for estimation of sugar
- John Bennett Fenn (1917–2010), 2002 Nobel Prize in Chemistry for work in mass spectrometry
- Enrico Fermi (1901–1954), Nuclear chemist and elementary particle physicist, Nobel Prize in Physics 1938
- Louis Fieser (1899–1977), American chemist who work on blood-clotting agents including the first synthesis of vitamin K, and was the author of numerous textbooks
- Mary Peters Fieser (1909–1997), American chemist who worked on quinones and steroids, and was co-author of chemistry books
- Barbara J. Finlayson-Pitts (PhD 1973), Canadian-American chemist who works on the chemistry of the upper and lower atmosphere
- Emil Fischer (1852–1919), 1902 Nobel Prize in Chemistry, known for work on stereochemistry and for the lock and key mechanism of enzyme action
- Emily V. Fischer (born 1979/1980), American chemist notable for work on the WE-CAN project and on peroxyacetyl nitrate
- Ernst Gottfried Fischer (1754–1831), German chemist who proposed a system of equivalents based on sulfuric acid equal to 1000
- Ernst Otto Fischer (1918–2007), German chemist, 1973 Nobel Prize in Chemistry for pioneering work on organometallic chemistry
- Franz Joseph Emil Fischer (1877–1947), German chemist, co-discovered the Fischer–Tropsch process
- Hans Fischer (1881–1945), German organic chemist, 1930 Nobel Prize in Chemistry for research on the constitution of haemin and chlorophyll
- Nellie Ivy Fisher (1907–1995), London-born industrial chemist known for photographic chemistry
- Wilhelm Rudolph Fittig (1835–1910), German chemist, co-discovered Wurtz–Fittig reaction

=== Fl–Fu ===
- Edith M. Flanigen (born 1929), American chemist known for synthesizing emeralds and zeolites
- Nicolas Flamel (c. 1330–1418), French alchemist who was believed to have created and discovered the philosopher's stone
- Paul Flory (1910–1985), American chemist, 1974 Nobel Prize in Chemistry for work on the physical chemistry of macromolecules
- Maria Forsyth (PhD 1990), Australian chemist known for work on energy storage and on corrosion
- Margaret D. Foster (1895–1970), Manhattan Project chemist and the first female chemist to work for the United States Geological Survey
- Antoine François, comte de Fourcroy (1775–1809), co-discovered the element Iridium and developed modern chemical notation
- Joanna Fowler (born 1942), American neural chemist who studied effects on the human brain and radiotracers in brain chemistry
- Michelle Francl (PhD 1983), American computational chemist known for the 6-31G* basis set for Na to Ar and electrostatic potential charges
- Edward Frankland (1825–1899), English chemist, one of the originators of organometallic chemistry who introduced the concept of valence
- Rosalind Franklin (1920–1958), British chemist and crystallographer whose work was central to understanding the molecular structure of DNA
- Katherine Franz (born 1972), American chemist noted for work in metal ion coordination in biological systems
- Herman Frasch (1851–1914), German mining engineer and inventor, pioneered the Frasch process
- Bertram Fraser-Reid (1934–2020), Jamaican synthetic organic chemist who developed the armed-disarmed principle in glycosylation chemistry
- Helen Murray Free (1923–2021), American chemist who developed self-testing systems for diabetes
- Carl Remigius Fresenius (1818–1897), German chemist known for work in analytical chemistry
- Ida Freund (1863–1914), British chemist known for texts on chemistry teaching, andy first woman university chemistry lecturer in the UK
- Charles Friedel (1832–1899), French chemist, developer of Friedel–Crafts reaction
- Alexander Naumovich Frumkin (1895–1976), electrochemist and chemist who develped applied electrochemical processes related to chemical sources of electrical power
- Kenichi Fukui (1918–1998), 1981 Nobel Prize in Chemistry for investigating mechanisms of chemical reactions
- Elizabeth Fulhame (18th–19th centuries), British chemist, pioneer in the study of catalysis and discoverer of photoreduction
- Vera Furness (1921–2002), English chemist and industrial manager who worked on the production of the acrylic Courtelle

== G ==
=== Ga–Gl ===
- Johan Gadolin (1760–1852), Finnish chemist who discvered yttrium
- Joseph Louis Gay-Lussac (1778–1850), French chemist and physicist who discovered the Gay-Lussac law, known for discovering that water is made of two parts hydrogen and one part oxygen by volume
- Charles Frédéric Gerhardt (1816–1856), French chemist known for reforming the notation for chemical formulas, and for synthesizing acetylsalicylic acid (aspirin)
- Jnan Chandra Ghosh (1894–1959), Indian chemist known for research on strong electrolytes and the dissociation--ionization theory
- William Giauque (1895–1982), 1949 Nobel Prize in Chemistry for studies of the properties of matter at temperatures close to absolute zero
- Josiah Willard Gibbs (1839–1903), American chemist and physicist whose work on thermodynamics helped to transform physical chemistry into a rigorous deductive science
- Walter Gilbert (born 1932), 1980 Nobel Prize in Chemistry for a method of sequencing nucleic acids
- Cornelia Gillyard (born 1941), American organic chemist known for work with chemicals in the environment
- Henry Gilman (1893–1986), American chemist who developed organometallic chemistry, and discovered the Gilman reagent
- Judith Giordan (Thesis 1980), American chemist who worked on unsaturated hydrocarbons and became President-Elect of the American Chemical Society
- Johann Rudolf Glauber (1604–1670), Dutch-German alchemist and chemist who discovered sodium sulfate and wrote many books
- Lawrence E. Glendenin (1918–2008), American chemist, co-discovered the element promethium

=== Gm–Gu ===
- Leopold Gmelin (1788–1853), German chemist who discovered potassium ferricyanide; author of Handbook of Chemistry, which is still used
- Theodore Nicolas Gobley (1811–1874), French chemist, pioneer in brain tissues analysis, discoverer of lecithin
- Sulamith Goldhaber (1923–1965), Austrian-American chemist, high-energy physicist, and molecular spectroscopist
- Victor Goldschmidt (1888–1947), Norwegian mineralogist considered to be one of the founders of modern geochemistry
- Moses Gomberg (1866–1947), Russian-American chemist, known for pioneering work in radical chemistry
- Mary L. Good (1931–2019), American inorganic chemist who studied catalysis by ruthenium
- David van Goorle also called Gorlaeus (1591–1612), Dutch chemist, one of the first modern atomists, who thought that all bodies are made up of atoms
- Loney Gordon (1915–1999), American chemist who assisted in creating the pertussis vaccine
- Carl Gräbe (1841–1927), German chemist who synthesized the dye alizarin
- Thomas Graham (1805–1869), Scottish chemist known for pioneering work on dialysis and diffusion of gases
- Harry B. Gray (born 1935), American chemist known for the kinetics of long-range electron-transfer reactions in metalloproteins; 2004 Wolf Prize in Chemistry
- Martha Greenblatt (born 1941), American solid state inorganic chemist, 2003 American Chemical Society's Garvan-Olin Medal
- Bettye Washington Greene (1935–1995), American industrial chemist who studied colloid and latex chemistry, including interactions between latex and paper
- Sandra C. Greer (born 1945), American chemist notable for work on thermodynamics of fluids, polymer solutions and phase transitions
- François Auguste Victor Grignard (1871–1935), French chemist, 1912 Nobel Prize in Chemistry for his work on reactions important in the formation of carbon–carbon bonds
- Robert H. Grubbs (1942–2021), 2005 Nobel Prize in Chemistry for work on olefin metathesis
- Louis-Bernard Guyton de Morveau (1737–1816), French chemist known for establishing modern chemical nomenclature

== H ==
=== Ha ===
- Fritz Haber (1868–1934), German chemist, 1918 Nobel Prize in Chemistry, father of the Haber process
- Dorothy Hahn (1876–1950), early American organic chemist and ultraviolet spectroscopist
- Otto Hahn (1879–1968), German chemist, discoverer of nuclear fission, 1944 Nobel Prize in Chemistry, father of nuclear chemistry
- Sossina M. Haile (born 1966), American chemist notable for developing the first solid acid fuel cells
- Naomi Halas (PhD 1987), American biochemist focusing on nanoshells and nanophotonics
- John Burdon Sanderson Haldane (1892–1962), British and Indian biochemist, geneticist and evolutionary biologist
- Charles Martin Hall (1863–1914), American chemist known for the Hall-Héroult process for inexpensive production of aluminum
- Frances Mary Hamer (1894–1980), British chemist who specialized in photographic sensitization compounds
- George S. Hammond (1921–2005), American chemist, famous for Hammond's postulate as part of the general theory of the transition state in chemical reactions
- Arthur Harden (1865–1940), English biochemist, Nobel Prize in Chemistry in 1929 for work on the fermentation of sugar and fermentative enzymes
- Elizabeth Hardy (1915–2008), Canadian-American chemist who discovered the Cope rearrangement of dienes
- Anna J. Harrison (1912–1998), American chemist who studied the structure of organic compounds and their interaction with light, first woman President of the American Chemical Society
- Odd Hassel (1897–1981), Norwegian chemist who established the three-dimensionality of molecular geometry, 1969 Nobel Prize in chemistry
- Charles Hatchett (1765–1847), English chemist who discovered niobium
- Herbert A. Hauptman (1917–2011), American mathematician who developed a method that opened a new era in research in determination of molecular structures of crystallized materials, 1985 Nobel Prize in chemistry
- Walter Hawkins (1911–1992), American chemist, a pioneer of polymer chemistry, who co-invented a polymer with antioxidants that prevented deterioration even in extreme temperatures
- Walter Haworth (1883–1950), British chemist, 1937 Nobel Prize in chemistry "for his investigations on carbohydrates and vitamin C"
- Sam Hay (PhD 2004), New Zealand chemist known for in silico enzymology, quantum mechanics roles in biological processes
- Alma Levant Hayden (1927–1967), American spectrophotometrist known for showing that Krebiozen was a quack anti-cancer agent
- Jabir Ibn Hayyan (722–804), Persian-Arab chemist and alchemist, purported author of many works in Arabic

=== He–Hi ===
- Clayton Heathcock (born 1936), American chemist known for his work on the synthesis of complex polycyclic natural products
- Alan J. Heeger (1936–2023), American chemist known for co-founding the field of conducting polymers, 2000 Nobel Prize in chemistry
- Jan Baptist van Helmont (1579–1644), chemist from the Spanish Netherlands known for studying the weight gain of growing plants, The founder of pneumatic chemistry
- Victor Henri (1872–1940), French physical chemist of Russian parents, the first to apply ideas of physical chemistry to the properties of enzymes.
- Dudley R. Herschbach (born 1932), American chemist, 1986 Nobel Prize in chemistry for work on the dynamics of chemical elementary processes
- Avram Hershko (born 1937), Hungarian-born Israeli biochemist, 2004 Nobel Prize in chemistry for the discovery of ubiquitin-mediated protein degradation
- Charles Herty (1867–1938), American chemist who revolutionized the turpentine industry
- Gerhard Herzberg (1904–1999), German-Canadian chemist, 1971 Nobel Prize in Chemistry for work on electronic structure and geometry of molecules, particularly free radicals
- Germain Henri Hess (1802–1850), Swiss-born Russian chemist who formulated Hess's law, an early principle of thermochemistry
- George de Hevesy (1885–1966), Hungarian chemist who discovered hafnium, Nobel Prize in chemistry 1943 for the development of radioactive tracers to study metabolism
- Jaroslav Heyrovský (1890–1967), Czech chemist, 1959 Nobel Prize in Chemistry for the invention of polarography
- Evelyn Hickmans (1883–1972), British biochemist, pioneer in treatment of phenylketonuria
- Joel Hildebrand (1881–1983), American educator and chemist specializing in liquids and nonelectrolyte solutions
- Mary Elliott Hill (1907–1969), American chemist who developed analytic methodology for ultraviolet light
- Cyril Norman Hinshelwood (1897–1967), English physical chemist known for study of chemical kinetics, Nobel Prize in Chemistry in 1956

=== Ho–Hu ===
- Gladys Lounsbury Hobby (1910–1993), American microbiologist known for development and early understanding of antibiotics
- Dorothy Hodgkin (1910–1994), British chemist, 1964 Nobel Prize in chemistry for development of protein crystallography
- Jacobus Henricus van 't Hoff (1852–1911), Dutch physical chemist known for developing the princioles of chemical thermodynamics, 1901 Nobel Prize in Chemistry
- Albert Hofmann (1906–2008), Swiss chemist, synthesized Lysergic acid diethylamide (LSD)
- August Wilhelm Hofmann (1818–1892), German chemist, first to isolate sorbic acid
- Darleane C. Hoffman (1926–2025), American nuclear chemist who studied the properties of transuranium elements
- Friedrich Hoffmann (1660–1742), German physician and chemist who found that lime, magnesia, etc. existed in almost all mineral springs in Germany
- Roald Hoffmann (born 1937), Polish-born American chemist, 1981 Nobel Prize in Chemistry for theories of the course of chemical reactions
- Antonín Holý (1936–2012), Czech medicinal chemist known for acyclic nucleoside phosphonates, including Cidofovir, Adefovir and Tenofovir
- Mei Hong (born 1970), Chinese-American biophysical chemist known for development solid-state nuclear magnetic resonance to elucidate the structures and mechanisms of membrane proteins
- Frederick Gowland Hopkins (1861–1947), British biochemist, known for discovery of vitamins, Nobel Prize in Physiology or Medicine in 1929
- Marjorie G. Horning (1917–2020), American biochemist and pioneer of chromatography who developed new techniques for studying drug metabolism
- Benjamin Hsiao (born 1958), Taiwanese American chemist working to understand the structural, morphological development and manipulation of complex polymer systems
- Linda Hsieh-Wilson (PhD 1996), American chemist known for work in chemical neurobiology on understanding the structure and function of carbohydrates in the nervous system
- Heinrich Hubert Maria Josef Houben (1875–1940), German organic chemist known for work on ketone synthesis, terpenes, and camphor
- Coenraad Johannes van Houten (1801–1887), Dutch chemist and chocolate maker who invented cocoa powder
- Amir H. Hoveyda (PhD 1986), American chemist, particularly noted for developing catalysts for stereoselective olefin metathesis
- Marcia Huber (PhD 1985), American chemical engineer known for modeling the thermophysical properties of fluids
- Robert Huber (born 1937), German chemist known for crystallizing an intramembrane protein important in photosynthesis, 1988 Nobel Prize in chemistry
- Catherine T. Hunt (born 1955), American chemist who worked on nuclear magnetic resonance and became president of the American Chemical Society

== I ==
- Sir Christopher Kelk Ingold (1893–1970), English chemist known for introducing concepts such as nucleophile, electrophile, inductive and resonance effects
- Vladimir Ipatieff (1867–1952), Russian-American chemist who worked in petroleum chemistry and catalysts

== J ==
- Nancy B. Jackson (1956–2022), American chemist who worked on heterogeneous catalysis and the development of alternative fuels
- Marilyn E. Jacox (1929–2013), American chemist who worked on the spectroscopy of free radicals and other unstable chemical species
- Hope Jahren (born 1969), American chemist and isotope analyst known for using stable isotope analysis to analyze fossil forests
- Paul Janssen (1926–2003), Belgian physician and entrepreneur who discovered the antispasmodic drug ambucetamide
- Allene Jeanes (1906–1995), American chemist who developed Dextran to replace plasma in the Korean War
- Frédéric Joliot-Curie (1900–1958), French chemist and physicist, 1935 Nobel Prize in Chemistry for the discovery of induced radioactivity
- Irène Joliot-Curie (1897–1956), French chemist and physicist, 1935 Nobel Prize in Chemistry for the discovery of induced radioactivity
- Madeleine M. Joullié (born 1927), French-American-Brazilian organic chemist who worked on synthesizing organic compounds such as tilorone, furanomycin, and numerous cyclopeptides
- Percy Lavon Julian (1899–1975), African American organic chemist who was a pioneer in the chemical synthesis of medicinal drugs from plants. He was the first to synthesize the natural product physostigmine.

== K ==
=== Ka--Kj ===
- Henri B. Kagan (born 1930) French chemist, pioneer of asymmetric catalysis, 2001 Wolf Prize in Chemistry
- Isabella Karle (1921–2017), American chemist instrumental for extracting plutonium chloride from a mixture containing plutonium oxide
- Jerome Karle (1918–2013), 1985 Nobel Prize in Chemistry for the direct analysis of crystal structures by X-ray scattering
- Paul Karrer (1889–1971), Swiss organic chemist known for research on vitamins, 1937 Nobel Prize in Chemistry
- Alan R. Katritzky (1928–2014), British-American organic chemist, pioneer of heterocyclic chemistry
- Joyce Jacobson Kaufman (1929–2016), American chemist and inventor of conformational topology
- Melinda H. Keefe (PhD 2001), American chemist known for identifying solvents that can be used to remove dirt without damaging layers of paint
- August Kekulé (1829–1896), German organic chemist known for the theory of chemical structure, especially the structure of benzene
- John Kendrew (1917–1997), British biochemist and crystallographer known for solving the structure of myoglobin, 1962 Nobel Prize in Chemistry
- Ann Kiessling (born 1942), American chemist and reproductive biologist known for discovering reverse transcriptase activity in normal human cells
- Ann Kimble-Hill (21st century), American biochemist studying structure-function relationships of membrane proteins and lipids
- Petrus Jacobus Kipp (1808–1864), Dutch chemist, inventor of Kipp's apparatus
- Johan Kjeldahl (1849–1900), Danish chemist who developed a method for determining the amount of nitrogen in organic compounds

=== Kl--Ku ===
- Martin Heinrich Klaproth (1743–1817), German chemist, who discovered uranium and zirconium, and contributed to the discovery of other elements
- Trevor Kletz (1922–2013), British promoter of industrial safety
- Aaron Klug (1926–2018), winner of the 1982 Nobel Prize in Chemistry for developing crystallographic electron microscopy
- Emil Knoevenagel (1865–1921) German organic chemist, known for the condensation reaction of carbonyl compounds with active methylene compounds
- Jeremy Randall Knowles (1935–2008), British physical organic chemist known for studies of chemical mechanisms, especially in enzyme catalysis
- William Standish Knowles (1917–2012), 2001 Nobel Prize in Chemistry for work on asymmetric synthesis, specifically in hydrogenation reactions
- Walter Kohn (1923–2016), 1998 Nobel Prize in Chemistry for contributions to the understanding of the electronic properties of materials
- Adolph Wilhelm Hermann Kolbe (1818–1884), German chemist known for Kolbe nitrile synthesis
- Izaak Kolthoff (1894–1993), Dutch-American chemist with abundant published research in diverse fields of analysis, the "Father of Analytical Chemistry"
- Arthur Kornberg (1918–2007), American biochemist, Nobel Prize in Chemistry (1959) for discovery of DNA polymerase
- Hans Kornberg (1928–2019), British biochemist known for research in microbial biochemistry
- Roger D. Kornberg (born 1947), 2006 Nobel Prize in Chemistry for elucidation of how genetic information from DNA is copied to RNA
- Teresa Kowalska (1946–2023), Polish chemist, specialized in the theory and application of chromatography
- Hans A. Krebs (1900–1981), German-British biochemist, Nobel Prize in Physiology or Medicine (1953)for work on metabolic cycles
- Harold Kroto (1939–2016), English chemist, 1996 Nobel Prize in Chemistry for discovery of fullerenes
- Richard Kuhn (1900–1967), 1938 Nobel Prize in Chemistry for work on carotenoids and vitamins
- Eugenia Kumacheva (PhD 1986), Ukrainian-Canadian chemist with work on fundamental and applied polymers science, nanotechnology, microfluidics, and interface chemistry
- Theodore Kuwana, (1931–2022), American chemist, founder of the field of spectroelectrochemistry

== L ==
=== La–Li ===
- Irving Langmuir (1881–1957), American chemist, physicist, 1932 Nobel Prize in Chemistry for work in surface chemistry
- Auguste Laurent (1807–1853), French chemist who discovered trichloroethylene, anthracene, phthalic acid, and carbolic acid
- Paul Lauterbur (1929–2007), American chemist, Nobel Prize in Physiology or Medicine (2003) work which that the development of magnetic resonance imaging possible
- Antoine Lavoisier (1743–1794), French chemist who recognized oxygen and hydrogen as elements
- Nicolas Leblanc (1742–1806), French chemist and surgeon who discovered how to manufacture soda ash from common salt
- Henri Louis Le Chatelier (1850–1936), French chemist known for Le Chatelier's principle, which allows prediction of the effect of a changing condition on a system in chemical equilibrium
- Yuan T. Lee (born 1936), Taiwanese chemist, 1986 Nobel Prize in Chemistry for contributions to the development of reaction dynamics
- Valery Legasov (1936–1988), Soviet inorganic chemist known for his position as head of the Chernobyl Commission for the Chernobyl Disaster
- Jean-Marie Lehn (born 1939), French chemist, 1987 Nobel Prize in Chemistry for the synthesis of cryptands
- Marko Leko (1853–1932), Serbian chemist known for work on the nature of ammonium chloride
- Luis Federico Leloir (1906–1987), Argentine biochemist and winner of the 1970 Nobel Prize in Chemistry
- Raymond Lemieux (1920–2000), Canadian organic chemist, Wolf Prize in Chemistry
- May Sybil Leslie (1887–1937), British chemist, contributed to research on thorium and actium
- Gilbert Newton Lewis (1875–1946), American chemist and first Dean of the Berkeley College of Chemistry

=== Li–Lu ===
- Andreas Libavius (1555–1616), German doctor and alchemist who discovered how prepare hydrochloric acid, ammonium sulfate, etc.
- Carl Theodore Liebermann (1842–1914), German chemist, known for synthesis of alizarin
- Willard Libby (1908–1980), American chemist known for development of radiocarbon dating, 1960 Nobel Prize in Chemistry
- Justus von Liebig (1803–1873), German inventor and pioneer in agricultural and biological chemistry
- Karl Paul Link (1901–1978), American biochemist, discovered the anticoagulant warfarin
- John Wilfrid Linnett (1913–1975), British chemist at the Universities of Oxford and Cambridge, known for contributions to theoretical chemistry
- William Lipscomb (1919–2011), American chemist known for work in nuclear magnetic resonance, theoretical chemistry, boron chemistry, and biochemistry; 1976 Nobel Prize in Chemistry
- Joseph Lister, 1st Baron Lister (1827–1912), English surgeon known for recognising that putrefaction in wounds is caused by germs
- Arthur H. Livermore (1915–2009), American science educator and chemist who contributed to the synthesis of penicillin
- Mikhail Lomonosov (1711–1765), Russian scientist, anticipated the kinetic-molecular theory by 100 years
- H. Christopher Longuet-Higgins (1923–2004), British chemist with many contributions to theoretical chemistry
- Janis Louie, (born 1971), American chemist who works of catalisis by nickel-based systems
- Martin Lowry (1874–1936), British physical chemist who developed acid–base theory
- Sima Lozanić (1847–1935), Serbian chemist known for chemistry textbooks
- Alfred Lucas (1867–1945), Egypt-based English analytical chemist and archaeologist known for work after the excavation of Tutankhamun's tomb
- Ignacy Łukasiewicz (1802–1882), Polish pharmacist, inventor of the modern kerosene lamp

== M ==
=== Ma–Me ===
- Alan MacDiarmid (1927–2007), American-New Zealand chemist who discovered conductive polymers, 2000 Nobel Prize in Chemistry
- Carolina Henriette Mac Gillavry (1904–1993), Dutch chemist and crystallographer known for discoveries on the use of diffraction in crystallography
- Roderick MacKinnon (born 1956), American biophsicist known for work on ion channels; 2003 Nobel Prize in Chemistry
- Pierre Macquer (1718–1784), French chemist known for Dictionnaire de chymie
- Rudolph A. Marcus (1923–2026), Canadian chemist known for work on the theory of electron transfer reactions; 1992 Nobel Prize in Chemistry
- Jacob A. Marinsky (1918–2005), American chemist, co-discovered the element promethium
- Jean Charles Galissard de Marignac (1817–1894), Swiss chemist who discovered ytterbium and co-discovered gadolinium
- Vladimir Vasilevich Markovnikov (1838–1904), Russian chemist known for Markovnikov's rule describing addition reactions of hydrogen halides and alkenes
- Tobin J. Marks (born 1944), American inorganic chemist and materials scientist known for work in polymerization catalysts
- Alan G. Marshall (born 1944), American chemist, co-inventor of Fourier transform ion cyclotron resonance (FT-ICR) mass spectrometry
- Archer John Porter Martin (1910–2002), British physical chemist, 1952 Nobel Prize in Chemistry for the invention of partition chromatography
- Martinus van Marum (1750–1837), Dutch physician, inventor, scientist and teacher, which created the "large electricity machine"
- Elmer McCollum (1879–1967), American biochemist, known for work of diet on health
- Edwin McMillan (1907–1991), American physicist, the first to produce a transuranium element, neptunium, 1951 Nobel Prize in Chemistry
- Lise Meitner (1878–1968), Austrian and Swedish nuclear physicist instrumental in the discovery of nuclear fission
- Dmitri Ivanovich Mendeleev (1834–1907), Russian chemist, creator of the Periodic table of elements
- Maud Menten (1879–1960). Canadian biochemist known for early work on enzyme kinetics
- John Mercer (1791–1866), British dye and fabric chemist who developed mercerisation, a process for treating cotton
- Robert Bruce Merrifield (1921–2006), solid-phase chemist, 1984 Nobel Prize in Chemistry
- Julius Lothar Meyer (1830–1895), German chemist, one of the pioneers in developing the earliest versions of the periodic table of the chemical elements
- Viktor Meyer (1848–1897), German organic and inorganic chemist, known for work on vapour densities

=== Mi ===
- August Michaelis (1847–1916), German chemist who discovered the Michaelis–Arbuzov reaction
- Leonor Michaelis (1875–1949), German biochemist and physical chemist known for fundamental advances in enzyme chemistry
- Hartmut Michel (born 1948), German biochemist, 1988 Nobel Prize in Chemistry for determination of the first crystal structure of an integral membrane protein
- Huang Minlon (1889–1979), Chinese chemist, pioneer of modern pharmaceutical industries in China
- Stanley Miller (1930–2007), American chemist, best known for the Miller–Urey experiment
- Eugène Millon (1812–1867), French military chemist and physician who discovered the reaction of mercury and nitric acid with egg albumen
- David P. Mills (PhD 2007), British chemist who investigates lanthanide and actinide f-block elements
- Luis E. Miramontes (1925–2004), Mexican co-inventor of the combined oral contraceptive pill
- Peter D. Mitchell (1920–1992), British biochemist known for the theory of chemiosmosis, 1978 Nobel Prize in Chemistry
- Eilhardt Mitscherlich (1794–1863), German chemist, remembered for the law of isomorphism.
- Alexander Mitscherlich (1836–1918), German chemist known for discovering crystallographic isomorphism

=== Mo–Mu ===
- Karl Friedrich Mohr (1806–1879), German chemist famous for early statement on the Conservation of energy
- Henri Moissan (1852–1907), French chemist and the winner of the 1906 Nobel Prize in Chemistry for his work on fluorine
- Mario J. Molina (1943–2020), Mexican chemist known for discovery of the Antarctic ozone hole, 1995 Nobel Prize in Chemistry
- Jacques Monod (1910–1976), French biochemist, winner of Nobel Prize in Physiology or Medicine in 1965 "for discoveries concerning genetic control of enzyme and virus synthesis"
- Jeffrey S. Moore (born 1961), American materials chemist known for work on macromolecular architectures
- Peter Moore (born 1939), American biochemist known for work on the structure, function, and mechanism of the ribosome
- Stanford Moore (1913–1982), American biochemist known for automatic amino acid analysis, 1972 Nobel Prize in Chemistry for work on the structure of the enzyme ribonuclease
- Henry Gwyn Jeffreys Moseley (1887–1915), British physicist who discovered Moseley's law and introduced the concept of atomic number
- Gerardus Johannes Mulder (1802–1880), Dutch organic chemist who introduced the concept of protein
- Paul Müller (1899–1965), Swiss chemist who discovered DDT and its use as an insecticide; Nobel Prize in Physiology or Medicine in 1939
- Robert S. Mulliken (1896–1986), American physicist and chemist known for molecular orbital theory, 1966 Nobel Prize in Chemistry
- Jnanendra Nath Mukherjee(1893-1983), Indian chemist known for work on the electrochemistry of colloids
- Kary Mullis (1944–2019), American biochemist who invented the polymerase chain reaction, 1993 Nobel Prize in Chemistry
- Earl Muetterties (1927–1984), American chemist known for work on boranes and various aspects of catalysis
- Catherine J. Murphy (born 1964), American chemist and materials scientist known for work on nanomaterials

== N ==
- Robert Nalbandyan (1937–2002), Armenian protein chemist known for discovery of photosynthetic protein plantacyanin
- Sergey Nametkin (1976–1950), Russian organic chemist known the cracking of petrochemicals, and rearrangement of camphenes
- Louise Natrajan (PhD 2003), British chemist who ortks on actinide chemistry and luminescence spectroscopy
- Giulio Natta (1903–1979), Italian chemical engineer worked on high density polymers, 1963 Nobel Prize in Chemistry
- Costin Nenițescu (1902–1970), Romanian chemist who studied the oxidation of open-chain and aromatic hydrocarbons with chromic acid and chromic oxychloride
- Antonio Neri (1576–1614), Florentine priest, author of L’Arte Vetraria (The Art of Glass), the first general treatise on the systematics of glassmaking
- Walther Nernst (1864–1941), German physical chemist whose heat theorem led the way to the third law of thermodynamics, 1920 Nobel Prize in Chemistry
- John Alexander Reina Newlands (1837–1898), British analytical chemist, precursor of the periodic order of elements
- William Nicholson (1753–1815), British chemist and civil engineer, the first to achieve electrolysis
- Kyriacos Costa Nicolaou (born 1946), Cypriot-American chemist known for total synthesis of natural products
- Julius Nieuwland (1878–1936), Belgian and American prirest and chemist who worked on synthetic rubber
- Mathias Nilsson, Swedish physical and analytical chemist concerned with liquid NMR spectroscopy
- Alfred Nobel (1833–1896), Swedish chemist who invented dynamite and established the Nobel Prizes
- Ronald George Wreyford Norrish (1897–1978), British chemist known for flash photolysis and the Norrish reaction, 1967 Nobel Prize in Chemistry
- John Howard Northrop (1891–1987), American biochemist known for isolation, crystallization, and study of enzymes, proteins, and viruses; 1946 Nobel Prize in Chemistry
- Ryōji Noyori (born 1938), Japanese chemist, 2001 Nobel Prize in Chemistry for the study of chirally catalyzed hydrogenations
- Ralph Nuzzo (born 1954), American materials chemist known for work on the chemistry of materials, including processes that occur at surfaces and interfaces

== O ==
- George Andrew Olah (1927–2017), Hungarian and American chemist who worked on the generation and reactivity of carbocations via superacids; 1994 Nobel Prize in Chemistry
- Marilyn Olmstead (1943–2020), American chemist, expert in small-molecule crystallography
- Fred Olsen (1891–1986), British-born American chemist, inventor of the ball propellant manufacturing process
- Lars Onsager (1903–1976), Norwegian and American physical chemist and theoretical physicist who corrected the Debye-Hückel theory of electrolytic solutions, 1968 Nobel Prize in Chemistry
- Tony Orchard (1941–2005), British inorganic chemist whose research helped to lay the foundations of much modern consumer electronic technology
- Joan Oró (1923–2004), Spanish (Catalan) biochemist known for studies of the origin of life
- Hans Christian Ørsted (1777–1851), Danish chemist and physicist who discovered that electric currents create magnetic fields
- Wilhelm Ostwald (1853–1932), Baltic German physical chemist, 1909 Nobel Prize in Chemistry for contributions to the fields of catalysis, chemical equilibria and reaction velocities
- Larry E. Overman (born 1943), American organic chemist developing chemical reactions, particularly transition metal catalyzed reactions
- Geoffrey Ozin (DPhil 1967), British materials chemist known for research on nanomaterials

== P ==
- Paracelsus (1493–1541), alchemist
- Rudolph Pariser (1923–2021), theoretical and organic chemist
- Robert G. Parr (1921–2017), theoretical chemist
- Louis Pasteur (1822–1895), French biochemist, father of pasteurization
- Linus Pauling (1901–1994), Nobel Prizes in chemistry and peace
- Charles J. Pedersen (1904–1989), 1987 Nobel Prize in Chemistry
- Eugène-Melchior Péligot (1811–1890), French chemist who isolated the uranium metal
- William Henry Perkin (1838–1907), British organic chemist and inventor of mauveine (dye)
- William Henry Perkin, Jr. (1860–1929), British organic chemist, son of Sir William Henry Perkin
- Max Perutz (1914–2002), 1962 Nobel Prize in Chemistry
- Eva Philbin (1914–2005), Irish chemist
- David Andrew Phoenix (born 1966), British biochemist
- Georgy Pigulevsky (1888–1964), Russian chemist and biochemist
- James Pitts (1921–2014), American chemist known for work on photochemistry and atmospheric chemistry
- Roy J. Plunkett (1910–1994), discoverer of Teflon
- John Charles Polanyi (born 1929), Canadian chemist, Nobel Prize in Chemistry 1986
- John A. Pople (1925–2004), theoretical chemist, 1998 Nobel Prize in Chemistry
- Vera Vevstafievna Popova (1867–1896), one of the first female Russian chemists
- George Porter (1920–2002), 1967 Nobel Prize in Chemistry
- Fritz Pregl (1869–1930), Slovene-German chemist, Nobel Prize in Chemistry 1923
- Vladimir Prelog (1906–1998), 1975 Nobel Prize in Chemistry
- Joseph Priestley (1733–1804), no formal training as a scientist, discovered the element oxygen
- Ilya Prigogine (1917–2003), 1977 Nobel Prize in Chemistry
- Joseph Louis Proust (1754–1826), discovered the Law of definite proportions
- Evgenii Przhevalsky (1879-1953), Russian and Soviet chemist, father of analytical chemistry in USSR

== R ==
- Ronald T. Raines (born 1958), American chemist
- Adam Vladislavovich Rakovsky (1879–1941), Soviet physical chemist
- Venkatraman Ramakrishnan (born 1952), 2009 Nobel Prize in Chemistry
- William Ramsay (1852–1916), Scottish chemist, 1904 Nobel Prize in Chemistry
- C. N. R. Rao (born 1934), Indian chemist
- François-Marie Raoult (1830–1901), French chemist, known for Raoult's law
- Henry Rapoport (1918–2002), American chemist, UC Berkeley
- William Sage Rapson (1912–1999), South African chemist and co-author of Gold Usage
- Nil Ratan Dhar (1892–1986), Pioneering Indian soil chemist
- Ken Raymond (born 1942), American inorganic and bioinorganic chemist, UC Berkeley
- Prafulla Chandra Ray (1861–1944), Indian chemist
- Julius Rebek (born 1944), Hungarian American chemist
- Charles Lee Reese (1862–1940), American chemist and Chemical Director of DuPont
- Henri Victor Regnault (1810–1878), French chemist and physicist
- Tadeus Reichstein (1897–1996), chemist, 1950 Nobel Prize in Physiology or Medicine
- Oleg Reutov (1920-1998), soviet organic chemist
- Rhazes (Razi) (865–925), Persian physician, philosopher and alchemist
- Stuart A. Rice (1932–2024), physical chemist
- Ellen Swallow Richards (1842–1911), industrial and environmental chemist
- Theodore William Richards (1868–1928), 1914 Nobel Prize in Chemistry
- Wim Richter (1946–2019), South Africa
- Jeremias Benjamin Richter (1762–1807), German chemist, first used the term stoichiometry
- Nikolaus Riehl (1901–1990), German chemist
- Andrés Manuel del Río (1764–1849), Spanish-Mexican geochemist, discovered vanadium
- Robert Robinson (1886–1975), British chemist, 1947 Nobel Prize in Chemistry
- Pierre Jean Robiquet (1780–1840), French chemist, discovered caffeine, alizarin, cantharidin
- Hillar Rootare (1928–2008), Estonian-American physical chemist
- Irwin Rose (1926–2015), 2004 Nobel Prize in Chemistry
- Guillaume-François Rouelle (1703–1770), French chemist
- Hilaire-Marin Rouelle (1718–1779), French chemist
- Frank Sherwood Rowland (1927–2012), 1995 Nobel Prize in Chemistry
- Daniel Rutherford (1749–1819), Scottish chemist
- Ernest Rutherford (1871–1937), New Zealand born chemist and nuclear physicist. Discovered the proton. Nobel Prize in Chemistry 1908
- Leopold Ruzicka (Lavoslav Ružička) (1887–1976), 1939 Nobel Prize in Chemistry

== S ==
- Paul Sabatier (1854–1941), French chemist, 1912 Nobel Prize in Chemistry corecipient
- Frederick Sanger (1918–2013), 1958 and 1980 Nobel Prize in Chemistry
- Carl Wilhelm Scheele (1742–1786), Swedish 18th century chemist, discovered numerous elements
- Christian Friedrich Schönbein (1799–1868), German-Swiss chemist, invented the fuel cell, and discovered gun cotton and ozone
- Stuart L. Schreiber (born 1956), American chemist, a pioneer in a field of chemical biology
- Richard R. Schrock (born 1945), 2005 Nobel Prize in Chemistry
- Peter Schultz (born 1956), American chemist
- Glenn T. Seaborg (1912–1999), 1951 Nobel Prize in Chemistry
- Nils Gabriel Sefström (1787–1845), chemist
- Francesco Selmi (1817–1881), Italian chemist, regarded as one of the founders of colloid chemistry
- Nikolay Nikolayevich Semyonov (1896–1986), soviet physicist and chemist, 1956 Nobel Prize in Chemistry
- T. R. Seshadri (1900–1975), Indian chemist, pioneer in plant chemistry
- K. Barry Sharpless (born 1941), 2001 Wolf Prize in Chemistry, 2001 Nobel Prize in Chemistry
- Dan Shechtman (born 1941), 2011 Nobel Prize in Chemistry, discovered quasicrystals
- Patsy O. Sherman (1930–2008), 12 US patents
- John Sherwood (died 2020), British physical chemist
- Nevil Vincent Sidgwick (1873–1952), English theoretical chemist, known for work in valency
- Osamu Shimomura (1928–2018), 2008 Nobel Prize in Chemistry
- Hideki Shirakawa (1936–2026), 2000 Nobel Prize in Chemistry
- Alexander Shulgin (1925–2014), pioneer researcher in Psychopharmacology and Entheogens
- Salimuzzaman Siddiqui (1897–1994), Pakistani chemist, pioneer in natural products chemistry
- Oktay Sinanoglu (1935–2015), Turkish chemist
- Joseph H. Simons (1897–1983), U.S. chemist, discoverer of fluorocarbons, used in gaseous diffusion of Uranium for Manhattan project
- Jens Christian Skou (1918–2018), 1997 Nobel Prize in Chemistry
- Richard Smalley (1943–2005), 1996 Nobel Prize in Chemistry
- Michael Smith (1932–2000), 1993 Nobel Prize in Chemistry
- Ascanio Sobrero (1812–1888), Italian chemist, discoverer of nitroglycerin
- Frederick Soddy (1877–1956), British chemist, 1921 Nobel Prize in Chemistry
- Susan Solomon (born 1956), American atmospheric chemist
- Ernest Solvay (1838–1922), Belgian chemist and industrialist
- S.P.L. Sørensen (1868–1939), Danish chemist
- Gabor A. Somorjai (born 1935), 1998 Wolf Prize in Chemistry
- Viktor Ivanovich Spitsyn (1902–1988), Soviet chemist, pioneer in the chemistry and technology of rare elements and radiochemistry
- Georg Ernst Stahl (1659–1734), Important work on fermentation
- Wendell Meredith Stanley (1904–1971), 1946 Nobel Prize in Chemistry
- Jean Servais Stas (1813–1891), Belgian analytical chemist
- Branko Stanovnik (born 1938), chemist
- Hermann Staudinger (1881–1965), polymer chemist, 1953 Nobel Prize in Chemistry
- Harry Steenbock (1886–1967), American biochemist, worked on ultraviolet irradiation
- William Howard Stein (1911–1980), 1972 Nobel Prize in Chemistry
- Thomas A. Steitz (1940–2018), 2009 Nobel Prize in Chemistry
- Douglas Stephan, Frustrated Lewis Pairs
- Rose Stern (1869–1953), first British woman member of the Royal Institute of Chemistry
- Alfred Stock (1876–1946), German inorganic chemist, known for work in mercury poisoning
- Brian Stoltz (born 1970), award-winning American organic chemist.
- Fraser Stoddart (1942–2024), Scottish chemist, a pioneer in the field of the mechanical bond
- Molly Shoichet, award-winning Canadian biomedical engineer known for her work in tissue engineering. She is the only person to be a fellow of the three National Academies in Canada
- F. Gordon A. Stone (1925–2011), British inorganic chemist
- S. Donald Stookey (1915–2014), American glass and ceramic chemist
- Gilbert Stork (1921–2017), 1995/6 Wolf Prize in Chemistry
- Friedrich August Kekulé von Stradonitz (1829–1896), German organic chemist, principal founder of chemical structure
- Yellapragada Subbarow (1895-1948), Indian biochemist known for discovery of ATP and synthesis of many new ground breaking compounds
- James B. Sumner (1887–1955), 1946 Nobel Prize in Chemistry
- Kenneth S. Suslick (born 1952), professor at the University of Illinois at Urbana–Champaign, known for optoelectronic nose
- Edwin Sutermeister (1876–1958), American chemist, known for its work on papermaking
- Theodor Svedberg (1884–1971), 1926 Nobel Prize in Chemistry
- Joseph Swan (1828–1914), English physicist, chemist and inventor
- Frédéric Swarts (1866–1940), Belgian chemist, prepared the first chlorofluorocarbon compound
- Richard Laurence Millington Synge (1914–1994), 1952 Nobel Prize in Chemistry

== T ==
- Koichi Tanaka (born 1959), Japanese electrical engineer, 2002 Nobel Prize in Chemistry
- Henry Taube (1915–2005), American chemist, (1983 Nobel Prize in Chemistry
- Louis Jacques Thénard (1777–1857), French chemist, discovered hydrogen peroxide and Thenard's Blue
- Sir Harold Warris Thompson (1908–1983), English physical chemist
- J. J. Thomson (1856–1940), British physicist, Known in chemistry for discovery of isotopes
- T. Don Tilley (born 1954), organometallic chemist
- Arne Tiselius (1902–1971), Swedish biochemist, 1948 Nobel Prize in Chemistry
- Max Tishler (1906–1989), American chemist, 1970 Priestley Medal
- Alexander R. Todd, Baron Todd (1907–1997), British biochemist, 1957 Nobel Prize in Chemistry
- Evangelista Torricelli (1608–1647), Italian physicist and chemist, invented the barometer, pupil of Galileo
- Roger Y. Tsien (1952–2016), American biochemist, 2008 Nobel Prize in Chemistry
- Mikhail Tsvet (1872–1919), Russian botanist, known for adsorption chromatography
- Kristy Turner, British chemist

== U ==
- Georges Urbain (1872–1938), French chemist, discovered the element lutetium
- Harold Clayton Urey (1893–1981), American physical chemist, discovered deuterium, 1934 Nobel Prize in Chemistry

== V ==
- Lauri Vaska (1925–2015), Estonian/American chemist
- Louis Nicolas Vauquelin (1763–1829), French pharmacist and chemist, discovered the elements beryllium and chromium
- Vincent du Vigneaud (1901–1978), 1955 Nobel Prize in Chemistry
- Artturi Ilmari Virtanen (1895–1973), chemist, Nobel Prize laureate
- Max Volmer, Germany (1885–1965)
- Alessandro Volta (1745–1827), Italian electrochemist, invented the voltaic cell
- Alexander Vinogradov (1895-1975), Soviet geochemist

== W ==
- Johannes Diderik van der Waals (1837–1923), Dutch physicist
- Sir James Walker (1863–1935), Scottish physical chemist
- John E. Walker (born 1941), British chemist, 1997 Nobel Prize in Chemistry
- Otto Wallach (1847–1931), German chemist, 1910 Nobel Prize in Chemistry
- John Warner (born 1962), American chemist, 2014 Perkin Medal, one of the "founders" of green chemistry
- Alfred Werner (1866–1919), Swiss chemist, 1913 Nobel Prize in Chemistry
- Thomas Summers West (1927–2010), British analytical chemist
- Peter Jaffrey Wheatley (1921–1997), English chemist
- Chaim Weizmann (1874–1952), Russian chemist, developed the ABE-process
- George M. Whitesides (1939–2026), American chemist
- John Rex Whinfield (1901–1966), British chemist, discovered polyester fibres
- Otto Wichterle (1913–1998), Czech chemist, known for inventing modern contact lenses
- Heinrich Otto Wieland (1877–1957), German chemist 1927 Nobel Prize in Chemistry
- Julius Wilbrand (1839–1906), German chemist, inventor of TNT
- Harvey W. Wiley (1844–1930), American chemist, pure food and drug advocate
- Sir Geoffrey Wilkinson (1921–1996), English chemist, 1973 Nobel Prize in Chemistry
- Alexander William Williamson (1824–1904), English chemist, famous for Williamson ether synthesis
- Thomas Willson (1860–1915), Canadian chemist, discovered an economically efficient process for creating calcium carbide
- Richard Willstätter (1872–1942), German chemist, 1915 Nobel Prize in Chemistry
- Adolf Otto Reinhold Windaus (1876–1959), German chemist, 1928 Nobel Prize in Chemistry
- Günter Wirths (1911–2005), German chemist
- Georg Wittig (1897–1987), German chemist, 1979 Nobel Prize in Chemistry
- Friedrich Wöhler (1800–1882), German chemist, best known for his synthesis of urea
- William Hyde Wollaston (1766–1828), English chemist, discovered the elements palladium and rhodium
- Robert B. Woodward (1917–1979), American chemist, 1965 Nobel Prize in Chemistry
- Charles de Worms (1903–1979), English chemist and lepidopterist
- Charles-Adolphe Wurtz (1817–1884), Alsatian French chemist, discovered the Wurtz reaction
- Kurt Wüthrich (born 1938), 2002 Nobel Prize in Chemistry

== X ==
- Xiaoliang Sunney Xie (born 1962), Chinese-American biochemist, pioneer in the field of Single Molecule Microscopy and CARS (Coherent Anti-Stokes Raman Spectroscopy) microscopy
- Xie Yi (born 1967), Chinese chemist, member of the Chinese Academy of Sciences and a fellow of the Royal Society of Chemistry.

== Y ==
- Ada Yonath (1939–2026), Israeli chemist, 2006/7 Wolf Prize in Chemistry, 2009 Nobel Prize in Chemistry
- Sabir Yunusov (1909–1995), Soviet chemist (alkaloids)

== Z ==
- Richard Zare (born 1939), American chemist, 2005 Wolf Prize in Chemistry
- Nikolay Zefirov (1935-2017), Russian and Soviet Organic and Medicinal Chemist
- Nikolay Zelinsky (1861–1953), Russian and Soviet Organic chemist, inventor of the first effective gas mask (1915)
- Ahmed H. Zewail (1946–2016), Egyptian chemist, 1999 Nobel Prize in Chemistry for his work on femtochemistry
- Karl Ziegler (1898–1973), German chemist, 1963 Nobel Prize in Chemistry
- Richard Adolf Zsigmondy (1865–1929), 1925 Nobel Prize in Chemistry

== Chemists famous in other areas ==
- Marion Barry (1936–2014), Masters in Organic Chemistry, American politician
- Alexander Borodin (1833–1887), Russian chemist and composer
- Jerry Buss (1934–2013), PhD in Physical Chemistry, owner of the NBA LA Lakers and other sports franchises
- Catherine Coleman (born 1960), American chemist and retired NASA astronaut who went on two Space Shuttle missions
- Lionel Dahmer (1936–2023), American analytical chemist and author, known for being the father of serial killer Jeffrey Dahmer
- Emmanuel Dongala (born 1941), Congolese chemist and novelist
- Elizabeth J. Feinler (born 1931), American information scientist and past director of the Network Information Systems Center at the Stanford Research Institute
- Marye Anne Fox (1947–2021), American chemist and university chancellor
- Dolph Lundgren (born 1957), Masters in Chemistry, Swedish actor
- Primo Levi (1919–1987), resistance fighter, chemist and novelist
- Mikhail Lomonosov (1711–1765), Russian chemist, historian, philologist, and poet
- Angela Merkel (born 1954), doctorate in quantum chemistry, Chancellor of Germany (2005–2021)
- Gaspard Monge (1746–1818), invented descriptive geometry
- Francis Muguet (1955–2009), advocate of open information access
- Edward W. Morley (1838–1923), performed the Michelson–Morley experiment
- Knute Rockne (1888–1931), head football coach of Notre Dame
- David Rysdahl (born 1987), American actor, majored in chemistry from St. Olaf College
- Elio Di Rupo (born 1951), Prime Minister of Belgium
- Israel Shahak (1933–2001), Israeli chemist and civil-rights activist
- Margaret Thatcher (1925–2013), Prime Minister of the United Kingdom (1979–1990), research chemist at BX Plastics

== See also ==
- List of biochemists
- List of computational chemists
- List of psychedelic chemists
- List of Russian chemists
