= Campsie, County Tyrone =

Campsie Camsan
- Town
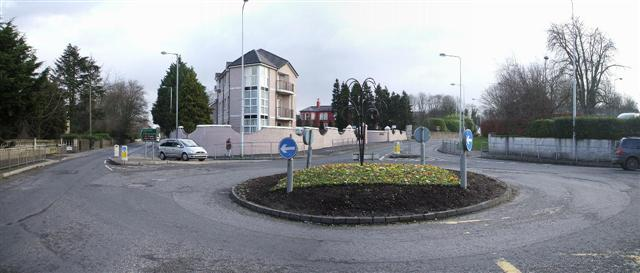
- Roundabout at the junction of Hospital Road and Killyclogher Road

- Location in Northern Ireland
- Coordinates: 54°35′57″N 7°16′58″W
- Sovereign state: United Kingdom
- Country: Northern Ireland
- County: Tyrone

Government
  - Type: Townland

Campsie (from Irish Camsan) is a small town in County Tyrone of Northern Ireland, in the United Kingdom. It is located in the historic barony of Omagh East and the civil parish of Cappagh, with a population of 1,923 in 2024.

== Landmarks ==
- Tyrone County Hospital (closed in 2017)
- Omagh High School
- Omagh Independent Methodist Church
