= Vera Furness =

Chemist 1921–2002

Vera Furness MBE
- Born: Vera Isabella Furness; 2 June 1921; Birmingham, England
- Died: 2002 (age 80–81); Limavady, Northern Ireland
- Education: University of London
- Occupations: Chemist; Industrial manager
- Years active: 1953–1981
- Employers: Courtaulds; BX Plastics

Vera Isabella Furness MBE (2 June 1921 –2002) was an English chemist and industrial manager who worked for Courtaulds in Coventry and later Campsie from 1953 to 1981. She worked on the production of the acrylic Courtelle and developed a copolymer that would allow for a more successful commercial dying of the filter. Furness then incorporated a reagent into the process giving it a near white fibre. She was appointed Member of the Order of the British Empire (MBE) in 1971.

== Biography ==
She was born in Birmingham on 2 June 1921. Furness originally studied to become a teacher at a teacher training college and went on to become a secondary school teacher. She studied for an external chemistry degree at the University of London whilst teaching full-time at Birmingham Central Technical College (today Acton University). Following her graduation from the university with a Bachelor of Science degree in 1946 in which she did a doctoral thesis on hexomethylenetetramines with dialkylanilines and phenols, she was appointed BX Plastics' development chemist, where she conducted research for her Master of Science degree. Furness' thesis concerned with preparing fluoroquinolones mono-substituted in the benzene ring.

Furness declined the offer of a full-time teaching job after finishing her Doctor of Philosophy degree in 1952 and went back to industrial research because she felt that was where her interest was. She joined Courtaulds in Coventry in 1953, and worked on producing Courtelle, an acrylic, and then developed a copolymer that would allow for a more successful commercial dying of the filter. She subsequently incorporated a reagent into the process, giving it a fibre that was nearly white. Furness was fully involved in every aspect of the process such as chemical and mechanical issues. She went to China, Poland, and Soviet Union to talk about the process of acrylic plants and the technical production before the plants were built. After the Royal Aircraft Establishment discovered the best fibre precursor as Courtelle in 1963 when it was developing carbon fibers for improved aircraft components, Furness took part in making the fibre better and made a process for producing it on a mass scale starting from 1965. She was head of the Acetate and Synthetic Fibres Laboratory from 1964 to 1969.

She led a section with 100 employees and was the first women to hold such a professional industry position over males in such a division in England. Furness was asked to lower energy consumption across each of the 400 sites in the United Kingdom during the oil crisis and did so by establishing objectives based on production. She was appointed general manager of Courtaulds Research Division in their factory in Campsie, County Tyrone and held the position from May 1970 to 1976. Between 1976 and 1978, Furness served as chair of Steel Cords. Following her move to Northern Ireland to become manager of Courtaulds' Campsie factory in 1978, she was on multiple boards and committees such as Enterprise Ulster; the Labour Relations Agency conciliator; the Northern Ireland Economic Council; the University of Ulster Council and the Western Education and Library Board. She left Courtaulds in 1981. Furness was also company director of Roe Valley Community Property from 28 July 2000 to 8 June 2002.

== Personal life ==
In 1971, she was appointed Member of the Order of the British Empire (MBE) "for services to export". Furness died in 2002 in Limavady, close to Derry, Northern Ireland.
