= Martina Casiano y Mayor =

Spanish chemist, educator (1881–1958)

- Born: 30 January 1881; Madrid, Spain
- Died: 1958 (aged 76–77); Cadiz, Spain
- Occupations: Chemist, teacher
- Known for: Textbook: Physics Experiments

Martina Casiano y Mayor (30 January 1881 – 1958) was a Spanish chemist and teacher who in 1912 became the first female member of the Spanish Society of Physics and Chemistry (La Real Sociedad Española de Física y Química, SEFQ). She was the first Spanish woman to write a textbook, which was titled Physics Experiments.

== Biography ==
Martina Casiano y Mayor was born in Madrid on 30 January 1881. At 14, she entered the Central Normal School, where her initial studies were not very fruitful. She even failed Arithmetic and Geometry, which would end up becoming her specialty as a teacher. Despite everything, her performance improved noticeably each year. After finishing with excellent grades, she passed the Elementary Primary School Teacher's Examination (June 1898), and the following year she obtained the title of Higher Primary School Teacher. Finally, in June 1901, she passed the Teacher Training Examination and earned her teaching certificate.

=== Teacher ===
On 2 March 1905, she won a competitive examination for a teaching position at the Horcajo de Santiago (Cuenca) Public School for Girls with a salary of 825 pesetas, but quickly took a new position on 14 July 1905 when she won another competitive exam. This one allowed her to become a tenured professor at the Higher Teacher Training College for Women in Bilbao at 2,000 pesetas per year.

For almost 30 years, Martina Casiano taught classes exclusively to women. She primarily worked as a tenured professor of Physics and Chemistry, but also taught Basic Agriculture, Physical and Natural Sciences, Arithmetic, Algebra and Geometry and Pedagogy. Apart from her teaching activity, she was very active on the Vizcaya Child Protection Board from March 1908 to October 1911.

There is no record of Casiano earning a proper university degree; instead, she took extra steps to expand her knowledge. For example, she taught herself German and French. In 1911, she received a grant from the Ministry of Public Instruction to further her studies in Madrid for six months. During this time, she was named a member of the Spanish Society of Physics and Chemistry for her research on chemical analysis, under the supervision of Professors Casares and Piña. Her stipend was considerable at 200 pesetas per month plus 105 pesetas for travel expenses.

=== Member of the SEFQ ===
Before one could gain admission to the Spanish Society of Physics and Chemistry (SEFQ), each candidate had to be nominated by two existing members. On 4 March 1912, Casiano was presented to the society by José Casares Gil and Santiago Piña de Rubíes and became its first female member. Despite this, her membership seems to have gone almost unnoticed, because much later, in 1921, another candidate, Carmen Pradel, was publicly congratulated for being the first female member of the SEFQ.

=== German studies ===
On 27 June 1912, the Board for the Extension of Studies (JAE) awarded her another scholarship to continue her studies for a year at the University of Leipzig, Germany, making her one of the first women to receive this aid. The scholarship amounted to 350 pesetas per month, plus 500 pesetas for travel expenses and 300 pesetas for tuition. She avidly followed the scientific movement in Germany, because Spain had been sending as many scientists there as possible to improve science education.

During her stay in Germany, she completed courses including, "Chemisches Praktikum für Lehrer," "Analytisch-chemisches Praktikum," "Anorganisch-chemisches Praktikum," and "Analytische Chemie unter Beruksigtigung ihrer theoretischen Grundlagen." During the second semester, she worked on "Experimental Physik."

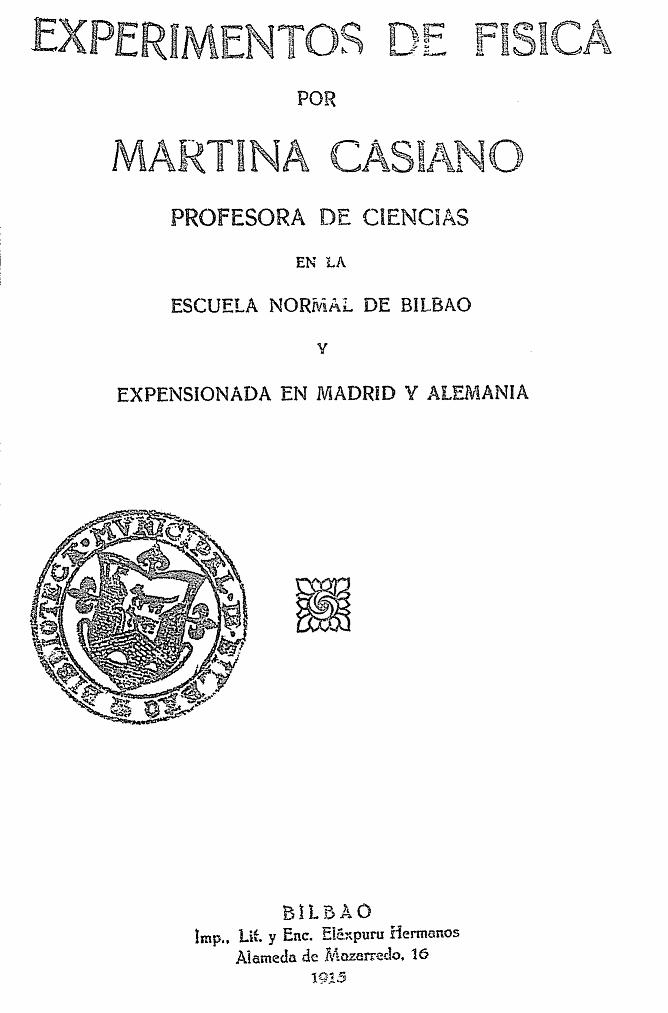
Physics Experiments by Martina Casiano (1915)

After completing her studies in Germany, she returned to the Bilbao Normal School for the 1913–1914 academic year where she found a new, larger, and better-equipped space for practical classes. Casiano wrote the work "The Teaching of Science" and published another book "Physics Experiments" in Bilbao in 1915, which was the first book on physics experimentation written by a Spanish woman. With this work, she sought to fill the gap in practical textbooks that took into account the difficulties faced by teachers in Normal Schools when trying to teach their students how to carry out experiments. Its approach was more pedagogical than usual, and it included a wide range of detailed experiments and useful questions, among other features.

During this second period in Bilbao, she combined her work at the Normal School with other activities that revealed her interest in scientific and pedagogical topics. For example, on 30 April 1914, she gave a lecture at Bilbao City Hall titled "Pedagogical Sketches." She was also put in charge of the Bilbao Meteorological Station, part of the Geographic Institute, beginning in August 1923. Furthermore, she served on the Vizcaya selection committee for the competitive examinations held in 1928. In 1931, she chaired the panel for the Vizcaya professional selection course. The last year she was admitted to the Spanish Association for the Advancement of Science (AEPPC).

=== Civil War years ===
Little is written about Casiano's activities during the Spanish Civil War (1936–1939). It is known that Martina, along with her sister Baltasara Paula, boarded the merchant ship Galdames, perhaps in an attempt to flee the new Franco dictatorship in Spain. However, the vessel was captured on 5 March 1937, after departing for Bilbao, off Cape Machichaco in the Bay of Biscay by fascist Spanish forces. The crew and passengers were arrested and sentenced to prison, but both Martina and her sister survived.

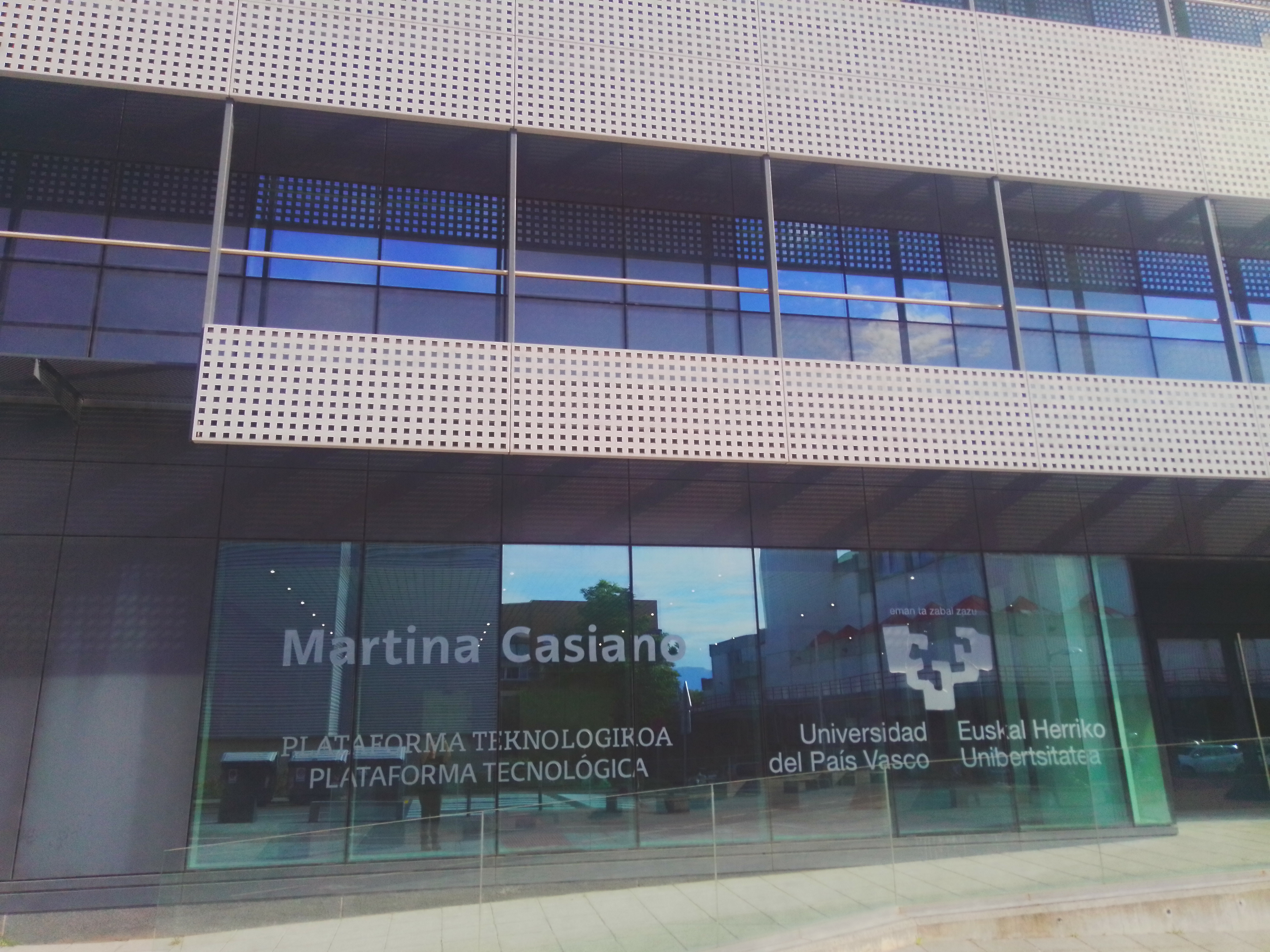
Martina Casiano Technological Platform of the Science Park of the UPV/EHU

Because of her arrest, at the end of the Spanish Civil War a purge file was opened against her, which resulted in a two-year suspension from employment and salary and forced her to transfer to the Teachers' Training College in Cádiz. There she worked alongside her sister, Baltasara Paula. Later, in Cádiz, Casiano managed to become a tenured professor of Science, teaching Physics, Chemistry, Hygiene, Physiology and Natural History at both the Fernán Caballero Normal School for Female Teachers and the Manuel de Falla Normal School for Male Teachers until her retirement in 1951.

Martina Casiano died in Cadiz at 77 in 1958.

== Distinctions ==
At the Science Park of the University of the Basque Country, the Technological Platform has been named for Martina Casiano.

== Memberships ==
- Spanish Society of Physics and Chemistry (SEFQ)
- Spanish Association for the Advancement of Science (AEPPC).
