= Louise Natrajan =

British chemist

- Born: Louise Sarah Natrajan
- Education: University of York (MChem); University of Nottingham(PhD)
- Known for: Actinides; Luminescence Spectroscopy
- Awards: Bill Newton Award (2015); Leverhulme Trust Research Leadership Award (2012)
- Scientific career
- Fields: Inorganic chemistry Actinide chemistry Radioactivity
- Institutions: The University of Manchester
- Thesis: Lanthanide and Group (IV) (OSO) binaphtolates : synthesis and catalysis (2003)
- Doctoral advisor: Prof. Polly Arnold
- Website: teamnatrajan.weebly.com

Louise Sarah Natrajan is a British chemist and a reader in the Department of Chemistry at The University of Manchester. Her research typically is based on actinide chemistry and luminescence spectroscopy, though some of her published research has extended to lanthanide chemistry, transition metal complexes and organic chemistry.

== Education ==
Natrajan completed her MChem in 1999 at University of York. Upon graduation, she read her Doctor of Philosophy degree at University of Nottingham with Prof. Polly Arnold on Lanthanide and Group (IV) (OSO) binaphtolates : synthesis and catalysis and successfully gained her PhD in 2003.

== Research and career ==
Upon completing her PhD, Natrajan completed her postdoctoral research from 2003 - 2004 with Prof. Marinella Mazzanti at CEA Grenoble in France. She was then appointed as a Leverhulme Trust funded postdoctoral research assistant with Prof. Stephen Faulkner at the University of Manchester from 2005 to 2008 and was an Engineering and Physical Sciences Research Council Career Acceleration Fellow from 2009 to 2013. In 2013, she was promoted to the position of Reader in the Department of Chemistry at the University of Manchester.

Natrajan's research is generally based on actinide chemistry and luminescence spectroscopy, though some of her published research has extended to lanthanide chemistry, transition metal complexes and organic chemistry. Her group also works with David P. Mills and Darren Willcox at University of Manchester.

Apart from research and lecturing, Natrajan and her team also actively participates in outreach activities including in Science Spectacular (2018), Pint of Science (2018), and Soapbox Science (2016). She also engages in work related to promotion and development of women in STEM. Natrajan is also the co-organizer of the 10th International Conference on Nuclear and Radiochemistry which will be held in August 2024.

=== Notable work ===
Dr. Natrajan has conducted several research on understanding of the chemistry of actinide ions in unusual oxidation state and also in radiochemistry, where she has developed new methods such as new optical imaging techniques to measure and probe radioelements.

In 2020, Dr. Natrajan participated in a research which showed how U^{(VI)} undergoes microbial reduction to form U^{(IV)} and U^{(VI)} via disproportion of U^{(V)}. This was the first time the mechanism for this process was significantly researched, and the study showed that the microbial reduction occurs via a single electron transfer to U^{(VI)} by the model Fe^{(III)}-reducing bacterium, Shewanella oneidensis MR1, to form U^{(V)} and thereby lead to the disproportionation. This research aids in the understanding of possible methods of reducing uranium mobility in contaminated environments.

Dr. Natrajan has also contributed to Organometallic Chemistry (Volume 42) where she discussed the use of near infra-red light in both multiphoton and upconversion processes as an alternative technique to luminescence spectroscopy in order to measure the excitation and optical properties of lanthanide^{(III)} complexes.

Dr. Natrajan took part in organizing the Newton Bhabha Researcher Links Workshop along with Prof. Prasun Mandal which was held on 14 to 17 December 2017. The workshop was aimed to bring together young and eminent scientific researchers from the UK and Indian institutes towards building international connections and thereby improving the quality of their research, and the three day workshop was concluded successfully, with 15 fully-funded participants from all over the UK taking part.

=== Awards and nominations ===
- Bill Newton Award (2015)
- Leverhulme Trust Research Leadership Award (2012)

== Major reviews and publications ==
1. Reviews:

- Natrajan, Louise S. (2012). "Developments in the photophysics and photochemistry of actinide ions and their coordination compounds". Coordination Chemistry Reviews. 256 (15–16): 1583–1603. doi:10.1016/j.ccr.2012.03.029.

2. Publications:

- Vettese, Gianni F.; Morris, Katherine; Natrajan, Louise S.; Shaw, Samuel; Vitova, Tonya; Galanzew, Jurij; Jones, Debbie L.; Lloyd, Jonathan R. (2020). "Multiple Lines of Evidence Identify U^{(V)} as a Key Intermediate during U^{(VI)} Reduction by Shewanella oneidensis MR1". Environ. Sci. Technol. 54 (4): 2268–2276. Bibcode:2020EnST...54.2268V. doi:10.1021/acs.est.9b05285. PMID 31934763.
- George, Kathryn; Muller, Julie; Natrajan, Louise S.; Berthon, Claude; Berthon, Laurence; Guillaumont, Dominique; Vitorica-Yrezabal, Iñigo J.; Stafford, H. Victoria; Tamain, Christelle (2019). "Exploring the Coordination of Plutonium and Mixed Plutonyl–Uranyl Complexes of Imidodiphosphinates". Inorg. Chem. 58 (10): 6904–6917. doi:10.1021/acs.inorgchem.9b00346. PMID 31025862. S2CID 133608770.
- Harvey, Peter; Nonat, Aline; Natrajan, Louise S.; Platas‐Iglesias, Carlos; Charbonnière, Loïc J. (2018). "Sensing Uranyl^{(VI)} Ions by Coordination and Energy Transfer to a Luminescent Europium^{(III)} Complex". Angew. Chem. Int. Ed. 57 (31): 9921–9924. doi:10.1002/anie.201805316. PMC 6099227. PMID 29898241.
- Oakland, Chloë; Andrews, Michael B.; Burgess, Letitia; Jones, Alex; Hay, Sam; Harvey, Peter; Natrajan, Louise S. (2017). "Expanding the Scope of Biomolecule Monitoring with Ratiometric Signaling from Rare‐Earth Upconverting Phosphors". Eur. J. Inorg. Chem. 2017 (44): 5176–5185. doi:10.1002/ejic.201700717.
