= Margaret D. Foster =

American chemist (1895–1970)

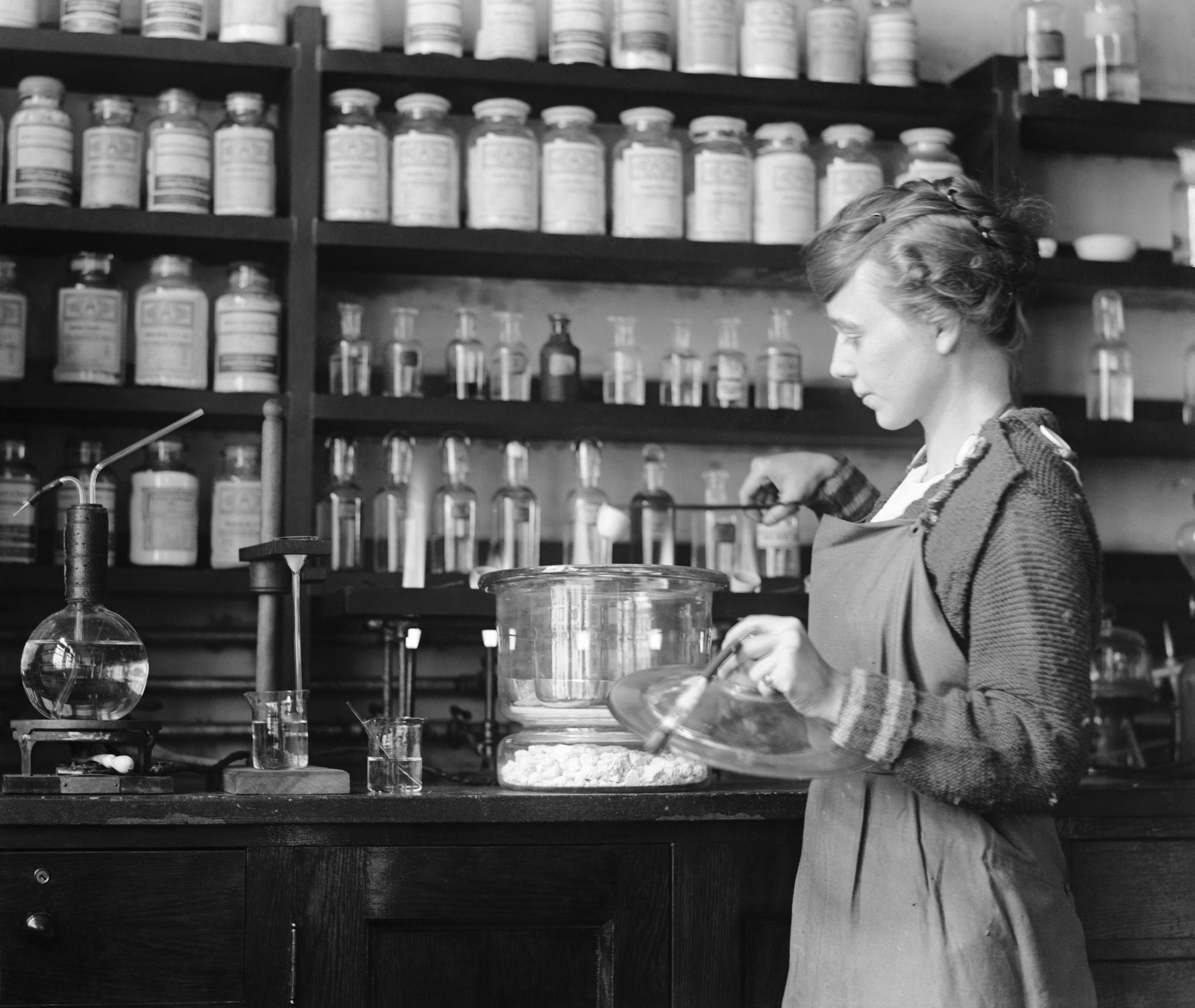
- Foster in 1919
- Born: Margaret Dorothy Foster; March 4, 1895; Chicago, Illinois, US
- Died: November 5, 1970 (aged 75); Silver Spring, Maryland, US
- Education: Illinois College; George Washington University (MS); American University (PhD)
- Known for: First female chemist to work on the United States Geological Survey, Manhattan Project Chemistry and Physics Section
- Scientific career
- Institutions: United States Geological Survey; Manhattan Project

Margaret Dorothy Foster (March 4, 1895 – November 5, 1970) was an American chemist. She worked for the United States Geological Survey, and was recruited to work on the Manhattan Project. She wrote dozens of research papers on the chemistry of the natural world and assaying methods.

== Life ==
Margaret ("Dot") Foster was born in Chicago, Illinois, in 1895. Her father was the Rev. James Edward Foster and her mother was Minnie (McAuley) Foster. She had a younger brother, Robert. Her father died in 1910, at which point the family moved to Jacksonville, Illinois, home of Illinois College. She graduated from Illinois College in 1918, earned a Master of Science at George Washington University in 1926, and a PhD from American University in 1936. Illinois College awarded her an honorary doctorate in 1956.

From 1918 she worked on the United States Geological Survey, developing ways to detect minerals within naturally occurring bodies of water. Methods pioneered by her include those for quantifying manganese, boron, fluoride, and sulfate, devised in connection with earning her post-baccalaureate degrees.

In 1942, during the Second World War, she transferred to the Chemistry and Physics Section of the USGS, where she worked under Roger C. Wells. In this capacity, she worked on the Manhattan Project, developing two new techniques of quantitative analysis, one for uranium and one for thorium, as well as two new ways to separate the two elements. Upon her return to the Geological Survey after the war, she researched the chemistry of clay minerals and micas. She retired in March 1965. Over the course of her career, she authored dozens of scientific papers, alone or with others.

She died at Holy Cross Hospital in Silver Spring, Maryland.

== Publications ==
- Foster, Margaret D. (1938). "The chemist at work. IX. The chemist in the water resources laboratory". Journal of Chemical Education. 15 (5): 228. Bibcode:1938JChEd..15..228F. doi:10.1021/ed015p228.
