= Adam Rakovsky =

Russian chemist, and scientist (1879–1941)

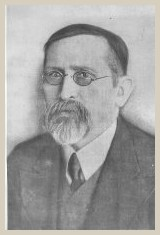
- Born: 12 (24 N.S.) December 1879; Mezhyrich, Siedlce Governorate, Russian Empire (later Warsaw Voivodeship, Poland)
- Died: 7 June 1941 (aged 61); Moscow, Russian SFSR, Soviet Union
- Education: Moscow State University (1903)
- Scientific career
- Fields: Physical chemistry
- Workplaces: Moscow State University

Adam Vladislavovich Rakovsky (Russian: Адам Владиславович Раковский; 1879–1941) was a Soviet physical chemist specializing in chemical thermodynamics; Doctor of Chemical Sciences (1935, awarded without dissertation defense), Professor (1918), and Corresponding Member of the USSR Academy of Sciences (1933).

== Biography ==
Adam Vladislavovich Rakovsky was born on December 12 (December 24, N.S.), 1879, in Mezhyrich, Siedlce Governorate (later part of the Warsaw Voivodeship, Poland), into a family of a schoolteacher.

In 1898, he graduated from the classical gymnasium in Biała, Siedlce Governorate, and from that year onward lived in Moscow. In 1903, he graduated from the natural sciences department of the Faculty of Physics and Mathematics at Moscow University, having studied under N. D. Zelinsky and V. F. Luginin. After graduation, he worked at the Moscow Central Chemical Laboratory of the Ministry of Finance (renamed in 1919 as the Institute of Pure Chemical Reagents): he worked as its director from 1917 to 1919 and as head of the Inorganic Chemistry Laboratory from 1919 to 1941. In 1914, he defended his master's thesis at St. Vladimir University in Kyiv on the topic “On the Theory of Adsorption”.

From 1915, Rakovsky taught at Moscow University: as a private docent (1915–1918), then as a professor (from 1918), and worked as chairman of the University’s Chemistry Department and of the Subject Chemistry Commission (1922–1928). Concurrently, from 1920 to 1922, he was a member of the management board of Moscow chemical plants under the Chemical Department of the Supreme Council of National Economy and a member of the Collegium of Chemistry at the Pharmaceutical Laboratory of the Chemical Department; he also worked as a consultant for Tsentrospirt, MinTsvetZolota and Giredmet. Upon the establishment of the Faculty of Chemistry at Moscow University in 1929, Adam Vladislavovich was appointed head of the Department of Inorganic Chemistry and, from 1930 onward, headed the Department of Physical Chemistry until his death. In 1933, he was elected Corresponding Member of the Department of Mathematical and Natural Sciences (Physical Chemistry) of the USSR Academy of Sciences. From 1933 to 1937, he worked as Dean of the Faculty of Chemistry and Director of the Research Institute of Chemistry at Moscow University.

He lived in Moscow at 29 Nikoloyamskaya Street and 4 Samokatnaya Street. He died on June 7, 1941, in Moscow and was buried at Vvedenskoye Cemetery (section 19).

== Scientific research ==
Adam Vladislavovich Rakovsky began his scientific career while working at the Central Chemical Laboratory of the Ministry of Finance (later renamed the Institute of Pure Chemical Reagents in 1919). During this period, he published a series of articles on rectification of alcohol, the kinetics of aqueous-alcoholic solutions, and the kinetics of consecutive first-order reactions. Additionally, he collaborated with other scientists on various research projects: with A. V. Frost on quantitative determination of trace chlorine in pharmaceuticals; with D. N. Tarasenkov on determination of sulfuric acid in the presence of chromic acid; and with Reichshtein on detection of selenium in sulfuric acid. These works were published in 1927.

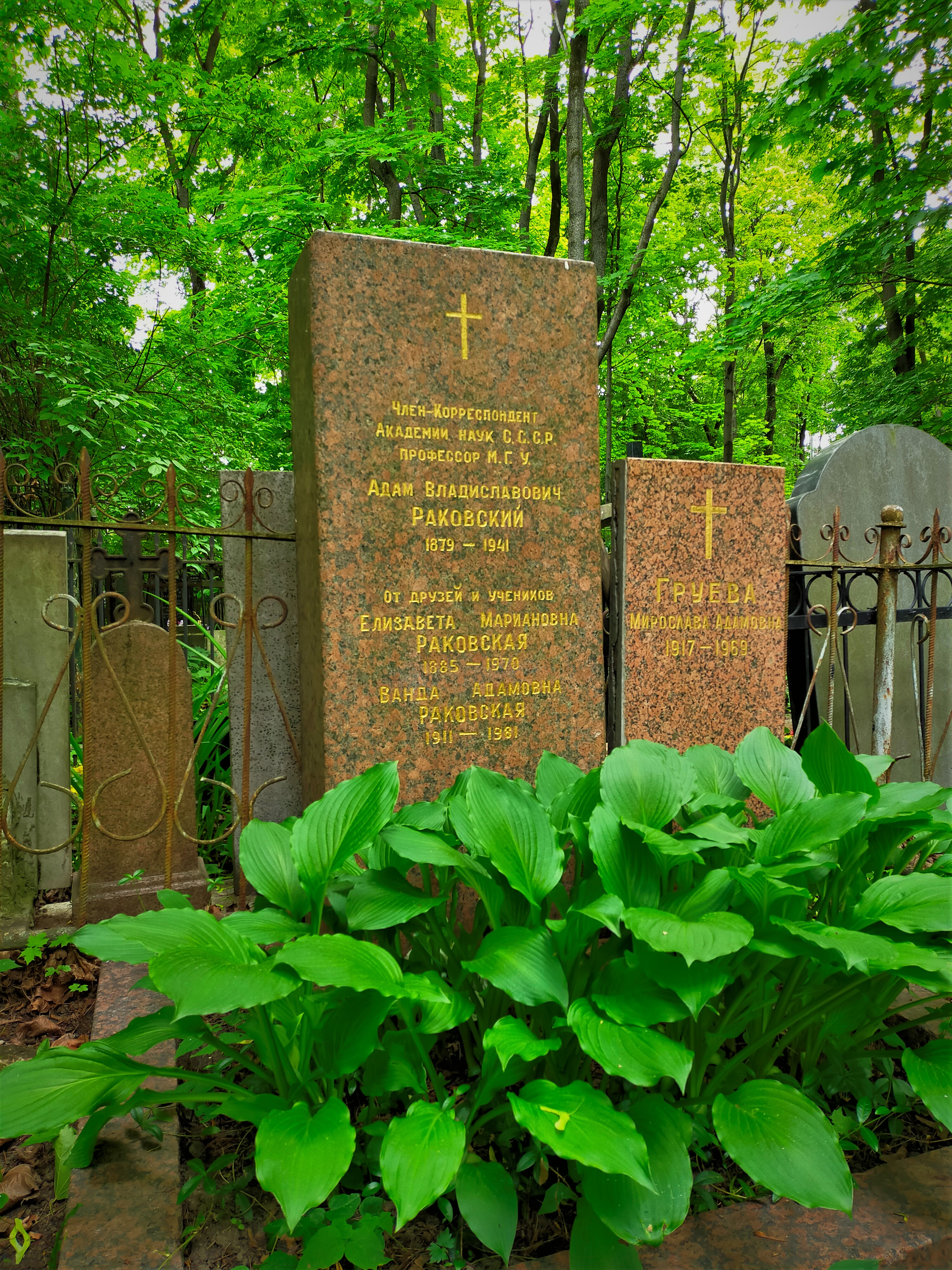
Grave of A. V. Rakovskii at Vvedenskoye Cemetery

During his master’s thesis research, Rakovsky conducted extensive investigations into the adsorption of water and aqueous solutions by starch. In particular, he carried out numerous experiments with starch and other adsorbents and demonstrated that in these cases the process is described by a complex sinusoidal equation. He also showed that adsorption of alkali and alkaline earth metal hydroxides follows a hydrolysis equation. His work “On the Theory of Adsorption” significantly influenced the subsequent development of this field of chemistry. In it, he addressed several aspects of his research: experimental work during which the phenomenon of hysteresis was discovered, application of Duhem’s theory to this phenomenon, and studies on the adsorption of substances dissolved in water by starches.

Having founded the Laboratory of Chemical Thermodynamics at Moscow State University in 1930, Rakovsky initiated research into heterogeneous equilibria at high temperatures. Together with colleagues, Rakovsky also carried out studies on salt equilibria. In total, the solubility of 27 ternary systems and one quaternary system was experimentally investigated. These studies later found practical application in developing methods for producing chemically pure chromium trioxide and ammonium dichromate. Several of Rakovsky’s works focused on salt isomorphism and purification of substances through fractional crystallization, leading him in 1932 to develop a method for cyclic separation of salts.

Rakovsky also conducted research on heteropoly compounds and the electronic theory of valence.

=== Mathematics in A. V. Rakovsky’s scientific works ===
In his scientific research, A. V. Rakovsky frequently applied his mathematical expertise to address novel problems and challenges. One of his earliest achievements was solving the problem of kinetics of consecutive reactions: in 1907, he derived its solution using a system of higher-order differential equations. The resulting mathematical model was later included in many textbooks on chemical kinetics and physical chemistry. In 1910, while studying water sorption and desorption on starch, Rakovsky employed empirical equations. In his works on alcoholometry, he used statistical methods, the method of least squares, finite differences, and homogeneous function. As a result of these studies, he compiled highly accurate measurement tables.

== Teaching activities ==
Following his appointment as Dean of the Faculty of Chemistry, A. V. Rakovsky took an active role in organizing the educational process at the faculty. His teaching efforts focused on one of the most important areas of physical chemistry — thermodynamics. Even as a private docent, he was the first to introduce lectures on thermodynamics specifically for chemistry students.

Rakovsky reinstated the lecture-based teaching method while preserving seminars and practical classes. In addition to thermodynamics, Rakovsky delivered lectures on applications of higher mathematics to chemistry and conducted supplementary sessions for senior students.

Rakovsky also taught courses in colloid chemistry. Between 1926 and 1931, he published several of his own courses, translated books, and textbooks on inorganic and physical chemistry. Around 1934, he began delivering lectures on physical chemistry. He was among the first educators to establish a coherent, systematic approach to its instruction. A notable innovation he introduced into his physical chemistry lectures was the study of the structure of matter. In 1938, his book “Introduction to Physical Chemistry” was published followed in 1939 by “Course of Physical Chemistry”.

=== A. V. Rakovsky’s views on chemistry education ===
Rakovsky advocated the lecture method of teaching but viewed lectures primarily as a means to motivate students toward independent study of scientific subjects through books. He rejected the practice of combining lectures with seminar sessions, believing they consumed too much time and offered students minimal benefit. Regarding laboratory classes, Rakovsky pointed out that strict time limits imposed on practical sessions negatively affected the quality of chemistry education.

== Works ==
- Раковский А.В. К учению об адсорбции (To the doctrine of adsorption). М.: печатня А.И. Снегиревой, 1913. – 194 с.
- Раковский А.В. Термодинамика химических процессов (записки студ. лекций, читанных в 1 МГУ – 1926-1927 г.) (Thermodynamics of Chemical Processes (Student Lecture Notes from Moscow State University, 1926–1927). М.: б.и., 1926-1927. – 270 с.
- Раковский А.В. Химическая кинетика и катализ. Доп. выпуск к основным началам физической химии А. Эйкена. Руководство для высш. учеб. заведений (Chemical Kinetics and Catalysis. Supplementary Volume to the Fundamentals of Physical Chemistry by A. Eucken. A Textbook for Higher Educational Institutions). М.-Л.: Гос. науч.-тех. изд., 1931. – 84 с.
- Партингтон Дж. Р., Раковский А.В. Курс химической термодинамики: Пер. с англ. с дополнениями (A Course in Chemical Thermodynamics: Translated from the English with Additions). М. ; Л. : Гос. научно-техн. изд-во, 1932. - 382 с.
- Раковский, А.В., Краузе Э.Ф., Богомолов А.Е. Курс общей и неорганической химии. Т. 1. (Course in General and Inorganic Chemistry. Vol. 1). М. ; Л. : НКТП СССР, Гос. химико-техн. изд-во, 1933. - 420 с.
- Раковский, А.В. Курс физической химии : Учеб. для хим. ВТУЗов (Course in Physical Chemistry: A Textbook for Chemical Engineering Institutes). М. : НКХП СССР, Гос. НТИ хим. лит., 1939. - 544 с.
