= Nikolay Zefirov =

Russian organic and medicinal chemist. (1935–2017)

Nikolay S. Zefirov
- Born: Nikolay Serafimovich Zefirov; September 13, 1935; Yaroslavl, RSFSR, USSR
- Died: April 28, 2017 (aged 81)
- Education: MSU Faculty of Chemistry (1953–1958)
- Scientific career
- Fields: Medicinal chemistry, Organic chemistry
- Workplaces: MSU Faculty of Chemistry (1958–2017); ZIOC RAS; IPAC RAS
- Thesis: Master's Thesis (1958): "Reactions of diene synthesis in the furan series" PhD Thesis (1961): "New substitutive addition reactions in the furan series" Habilitation (1966): "Research in the field of 7-oxabicyclo-[2.2.1]-heptane, heptene and heptadiene"
- Doctoral advisor: Yuriev, Yury

Nikolay Serafimovich Zefirov (September 13, 1935 – April 28, 2017) - was a Russian chemist known for his research in Organic chemistry and Medicinal chemistry and the development of new synthetic methods.

== Academic career ==
Nikolai Zefirov was born in Yaroslavl, Russia, September 13, 1935.

He entered the Moscow State University Moscow State University in 1953 and began his research during his Bachelor's degree. Zefirov joined Yury Yuriev's research group at the laboratory of heterocyclic compounds. His first article was published in Russian Journal of General Chemistry in 1956 and was dedicated to the preparation and applications of silicon carboxylates. Nikolay Zefirov completed his MSc with honors in 1958, defending a thesis on "Reactions of diene synthesis in the furan series". Then he continued working as assistant professor in MSU Faculty of Chemistry and graduated his Ph.D "New substitutive addition reactions in the furan series" in 1961.

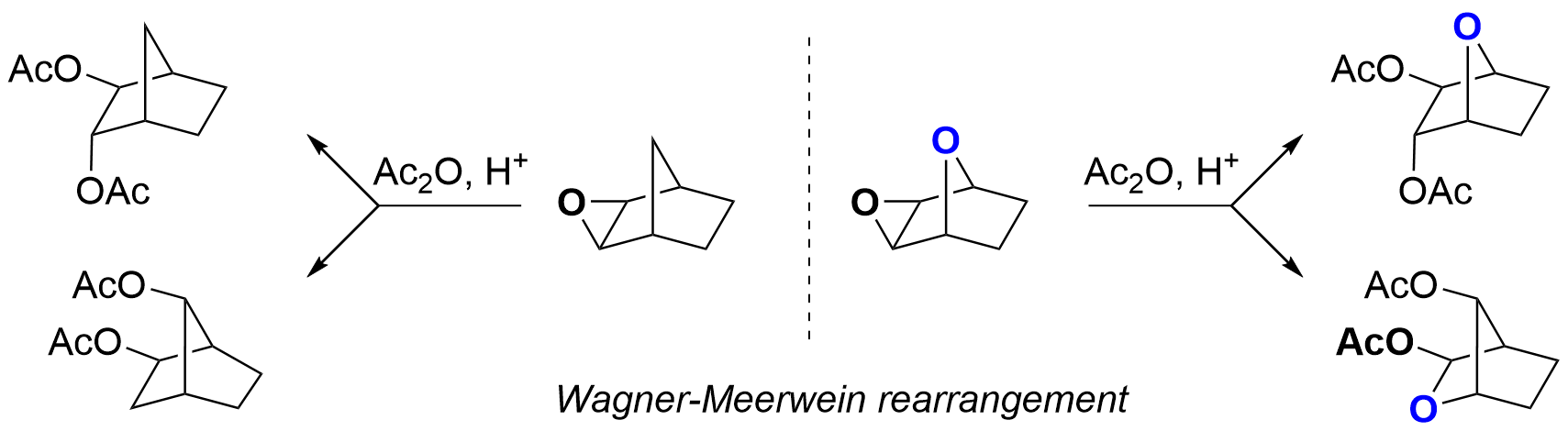

His research was focused on bridged oxiranes which are capable undergoing the Wagner–Meerwein rearrangement in reaction with acetic anhydride. Later these transformations have found applications for the trans-Jasmone synthesis. It is noteworthy that all research work of this time was conducted without access to NMR.

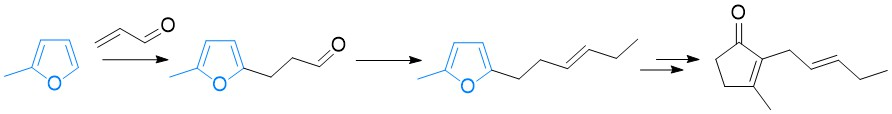

Zefirov obtained his habilitation in 1966. In 1970-1971 he interned at Princeton University in the USA as a Visiting Researcher. Upon his return in 1971, he became the Head of the Heterocyclic compounds laboratory. Ten years later, in 1981, he was appointed a Full Professor of Moscow State University, the Department of Chemistry. In 1981, he also was elected a Corresponding Member of the Russian Academy of Sciences and in 1987 he became a Full Member of the Russian Academy of Sciences referred to as Academician.

He was founder and Head of the Laboratory of Mathematical chemistry and Computer Synthesis, Zelinsky Institute of Organic Chemistry (ZIOC RAS), Chief Scientific Director of the Institute of Physiologically Active Substances of the Russian Academy of Sciences (IPAC RAS), and Chief Researcher of the IPAC RAS.

He headed the Organic chemistry department, MSU Faculty of Chemistry (1994-2014). In 2015, he founded and headed the Medicinal Chemistry and Fine Organic Synthesis Department (2015-2017). Zefirov not only excelled as a scientist but also imparted knowledge to students through courses such as "Organic Synthesis", "Molecular Orbitals theory in Organic Chemistry", "Computer Molecular Modeling and QSAR". He has also been instrumental in launching the MSc Medicinal chemistry program at Moscow State University.

Zefirov has authored over 1500 scientific articles and 94 patents.

== Major contributions ==
=== Synthetic organic chemistry ===
==== New approaches in Ad_{E}-reactions ====
Zefirov made significant contributions to the understanding of Electrophilic addition reactions by establishing the ion-pair mechanism using the example of Thiirane cations. In 1974 he discovered the phenomenon of increasing the effective electrophilicity of weak electrophiles, which was called "Doping-addition". Such effect occurs for weak electrophiles, increasing electrophilicity and making them reactive enough for electrophilic addition. Additionally Zefirov has developed thioacylation and thioamidation reactions in the presence of lithium perchlorate. The proposed reaction pathway includes onium ion formation with the following perchlorate ion addition. The “doping effect” can also be observed in more complex cases, such as induction of the skeletal rearrangement reaction in bicyclic compounds. Zefirov is also known for the work on the stereocontrol in reactions proceeding through the ion-pair mechanism.

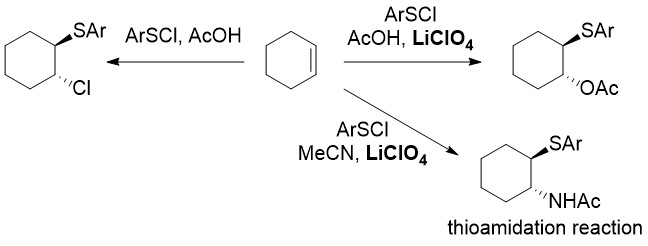

==== Nucleophilic properties of nucleofuge anions ====
Zefirov's research on the impact of LiClO_{4} on electrophilic addition and nucleophilic substitution resulted in the revelation of the Nucleophilic characteristics of extremely weakly nucleophilic anion like triflate and perchlorate. It has been shown that weak nucleophiles such can react through competitive covalent binding. Ultimately, this research led to the advancement of SO_{3}-promoted Ad_{E}-reactions.

==== Novel hypervalent reagents: I^{+3}, Xe^{+2}, Se^{+4}, Te^{+4} ====
He developed a novel class of hypervalent compounds and discovered their potential for use in fine organic synthesis. These compounds were identified as excellent reagents for oxidation reactions. Moreover, their ability to exhibit strong electrophiles properties and serve as efficient leaving groups was investigated. Notably, one of the discovered compounds has been named Zefirov's reagent in honor of its discoverer.

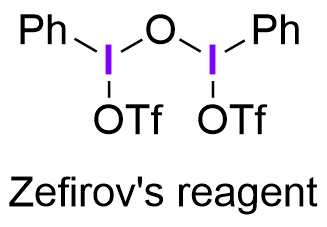

==== Spirocyclopropane structures ====
Zefirov was the pioneering chemist who conducted the synthesis of complex polycyclic structures, including heteroadamantanes. He also synthesized a novel class of spirocyclopropane structures and achieved the first successful synthesis of triangulanes.

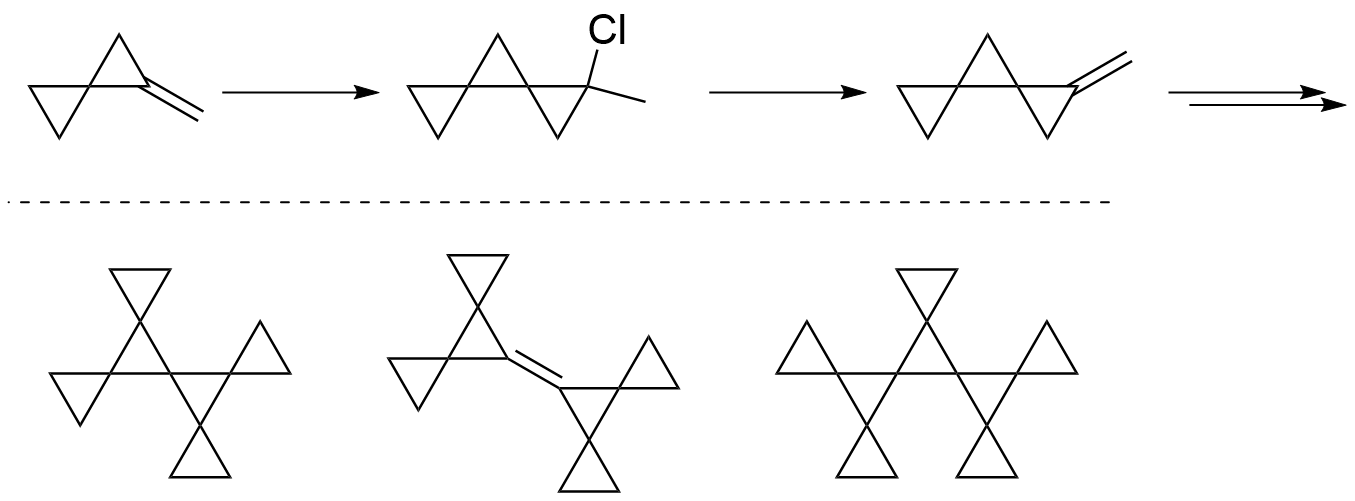

Amongst his studies on conformation, Zefirov found that spiro[2.5]octan-4-ol and derivatives thereof adopt predominantly axial conformations. This effect was later shown by Izzotti and Gleason to extend to most functional groups, with particularly strong axial preferences for larger and more electronegative groups.

==== Other ====
Tetranitromethane chemistry was among the scientific interests of N.S. Zefirov. It can react as a good dipole in 1,3-dipolar cycloaddition with alkenes. It was found, that the reaction of C(NO_{2})_{4} with a,β-Unsaturated carbonyl compound leads to isoxazole derivatives.

Zefirov discovered several skeletal rearrangement reactions. He was involved in investigation of various theoretical organic chemistry problems, such as σ-π conjugation, stereochemistry, and conformational analysis. He described the so-called “hockey stick effect” in conformationally mobile heterocyclic systems, and developed the Zefirov-Palulin model for calculation of folding parameters to describe the shape of cycles.

=== Computational chemistry ===
Zefirov is considered a pioneer in computational chemistry in Russia, having made significant contributions to the field. He developed a formal logical approach for the classification of organic reactions, as well as for the search new reactions and development of computer synthesis methods. Zefirov actively promoted QSAR in modern medicinal chemistry. His research spanned a wide range of topics within general organic chemistry problems, including the description of organic structures and reaction, the search for new structures, and the investigation of structure-activity correlations. Furthermore, he also conducted research on new drug-like compounds.
