= Jan Boldingh =

Dutch chemist (1915–2003)

- Jan Boldingh
- Born: 3 January 1915; Buitenzorg
- Died: 4 August 2003 (aged 88); Schiedam
- Education: Utrecht University
- Scientific career
- Fields: chemistry
- Doctoral advisor: Fritz Kögl

Jan Boldingh (3 January 1915, Buitenzorg – 4 August 2003, Schiedam) was a Dutch chemist.

Boldingh studied chemistry at Utrecht University. He received a PhD in 1942 for his thesis 'Synthetische onderzoekingen over het chromofore systeem van lumi-auxonstudies' on auxines in the group of Fritz Kögl. He worked for a short period at the Philips Natuurkundig Laboratorium in Eindhoven, but moved to Unilever in 1944 (1944: research department of Van den Bergh & Jurgens in Rotterdam; 1946: research department in Zwijndrecht; 1955: Unilever Research Laboratory in Vlaardingen). Between 1952 and 1967, Boldingh and H.A. Boekenoogen lead the laboratory together, but after 1967 Boldingh lead the laboratory by himself until his retirement in 1980. From 1964 on, Boldingh served simultaneously as a professor Organic Chemistry at Utrecht University.

Boldingh introduced a number of new analytic techniques (such as (gas-)chromatography, the coupling of gas chromatography and mass spectrometry, NMR and other forms of spectroscopy) in order to study complex problems in an industrial context. Boldingh was very interested in nutrition research, and especially the role of fats in nutrition. He stimulated the studies by David A. van Dorp concerning the role of unsaturated fatty acids that served as a precursor to prostaglandins (especially arachidonic acid and prostaglandin E2), in which the Unilever Laboratory collaborated intensively with Sune K. Bergström, who would receive a Nobel prize in 1982 for his studies in this field.

In 1964 Boldingh became member of the Royal Netherlands Academy of Arts and Sciences.

== Awards ==
- 1968: Wilhelm-Normann Medal of Deutsche Gesellschaft für Fettwissenschaft (DGF)
