= Sandra Eaton =

American chemist and professor

- Education: Wellesley College; Massachusetts Institute of Technology
- Employer(s): University of Colorado Denver; University of Denver
- Known for: Electron paramagnetic resonance

Sandra Eaton is an American chemist and professor at the University of Denver, known for her work on electron paramagnetic resonance.

== Education ==
Eaton completed her bachelor's degree in chemistry at Wellesley College in 1968. She was motivated by her professor at Wellesley College, Emily Dudek. As said by Sandra Eaton on the University of Denver's profile page, “I got to do some research with an amazing woman chemist, and that’s what got me hooked on chemistry,”. The quote shared discussed what got her into Chemistry and jump-started her career. She was elected to Phi Beta Kappa at Wellesley and published her undergraduate research. She earned a PhD at the Massachusetts Institute of Technology in 1972. MIT is where she met her husband, Gareth Eaton, who would one day become her research partner. Sandra and Gareth have made many edits to the EPR system research.

== Research ==
Eaton joined the University of Colorado Denver in 1973 as an assistant professor. She received a National Science Foundation Visiting Professorship for Women in 1984, and joined the University of Denver, where she was appointed professor in 1990.

Eaton is based in the EPR Center at the University of Denver. Her research is focused on electron paramagnetic resonance, which she uses to study organic radicals and transition metal ions. Using pulsed EPR it is possible to measure electron spin relaxation, which can help uncover the dynamics of molecules. examined the frequency dependence of electron spin relaxation in fluid solution for several important types of radicals. She has studied the mechanisms of spin and spin-lattice relaxation in rigid lattices and fluid solutions; identifying the role of methyl groups and nuclear spins in spin echo dephasing. Her systematic studies in both glassy solvents and fluid solutions can be used to establish the relationship between structure and relaxation. Eaton developed spectral-spatial imaging using EPR, as well as the analysis software to accompany it. She wrote "EPR Imaging and in Vivo EPR" in 1991.

Eaton has published several books about electron paramagnetic resonance and how to quantitatively produce the same results between labs. In 1998, Eaton published Foundations of Modern EPR. Distance measurements in Biological Systems by EPR was published in 2000. She published Biomedical EPR - Part A: Free Radicals, Metals, Medicine and Physiology and Part B: Methodology, Instrumentation, and Dynamics in 2004. In 2010 she published Quantitative EPR.

In 2016 she collaborated with a biotechnology company to develop commercial imaging equipment. She demonstrated a way to measure oxygen in the body in realtime, which can provide similar information to MRI. At the Knoebel Institute for Healthy Aging they are developing these techniques to monitor disease therapies in situ.

She has been principal investigator on several large NSF grants. She and her husband Gareth Eaton have a book fund at Harvard Library for chemistry students. She was appointed a Fellow of the Electron Paramagnetic Society in 2008. She has published extensively in peer-reviewed journals, has a H-index of over 50 and an I10-index of 239.

== Awards and honors ==
- 1996 Special Award of the International electron paramagnetic resonance Society
- 1995 United Methodist Church University Scholar/Teacher of the Year Award.
- 1997 University of Denver John Evans Professorship.
- 2001 American Chemical Society, Colorado Section Award.
- 2002 Bruker Prize, Awarded by the Royal Society of Chemistry
