= Omagh High School =

School, Crevenagh road in Omagh, Northern Ireland

Coordinates: 54.5995°N 7.2882°W

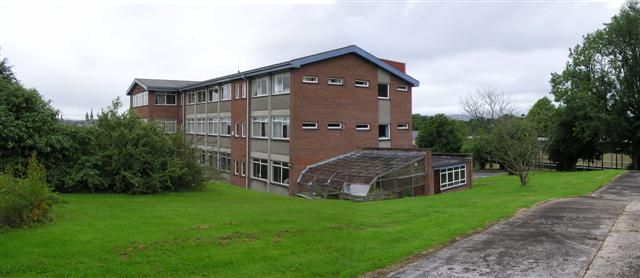
Omagh High School

Omagh High School is a secondary school in Omagh, County Tyrone in Northern Ireland. The school is located on the east side of town.

== History ==
Christos Gaitatzis became the new principal in 2019.

== Community ==
The school is supported by Friends Of Omagh High School, a charity recognised by the Charity Commission for Northern Ireland.
