= Margarita del Val =

Spanish chemist

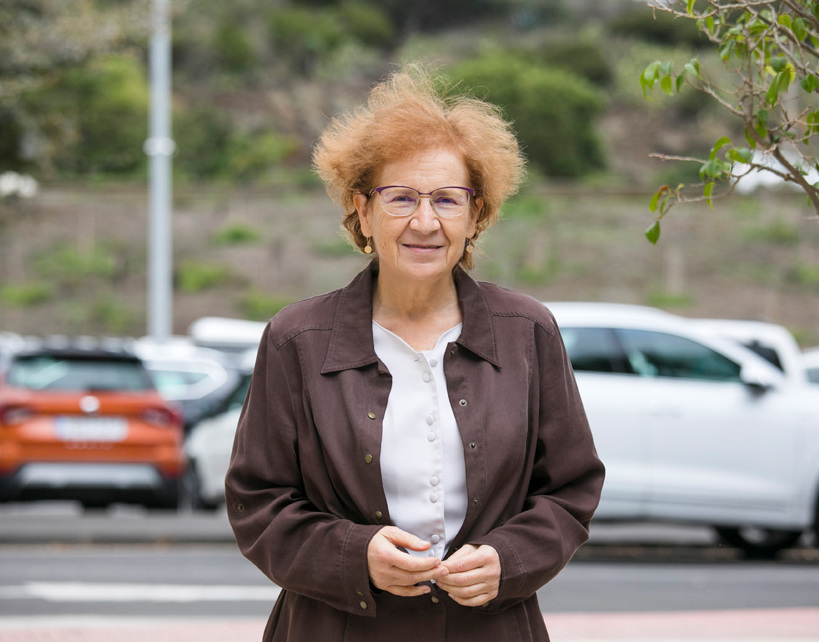
- Born: 1959 (age 66–67)
- Spouse: Enrique J. de la Rosa

Academic background
- Education: Autonomous University of Madrid
- Doctoral advisor: Eladio Viñuela Díaz

Academic work
- Institutions: Spanish National Research Council, Severo Ochoa Molecular Biology Centre

Margarita del Val Latorre (born 1959) is a Spanish chemist, immunologist, and virologist. She coordinates the Salud Global ("Global Health") platform run by the Spanish National Research Council (CSIC).

== Early life and education ==
Margarita del Val was born in Madrid in 1959 to the chemists Manuel del Val and Consuelo Latorre. del Val attended the Autonomous University of Madrid (UAM) starting in 1976, during the Transition. During this time, increasing protests on university grounds against the Francoist dictatorship culminated in all Spanish universities going on strike starting in 1973, which was ongoing when she arrived at the university. In the absence of any classes, del Val and other students read books and played games. One book she read described how proteins were made in cells, which influenced her decision to study biochemistry and she completed her thesis in 1985 under the supervision of Eladio Viñuela Díaz.

== Career ==
In the 1980s, del Val began working at the Severo Ochoa Molecular Biology Centre, a research institute at the UAM jointly run by the university and the CSIC. After completing her doctorate in 1986, she left for West Germany, spending two years at the Federal Research Centre for Virus Diseases of Animals in Tübingen, a now-defunct research institution of the Friedrich Loeffler Institute. She then spent three years at the University of Ulm. del Val returned to Spain in the 1990s, having developed an experimental vaccine design based on isolated T-cell epitopes. Afterwards, del Val stayed abroad at the National Institutes of Health in Bethesda, Maryland and McGill University in Montreal, before spending twenty years at the Carlos III Health Institute.

In April 2020, del Val helped set up and launch the Salud Global ("Global Health") program, a CSIC project facilitating COVID-19 research between over 300 Spanish research groups. del Val has provided her thoughts on Spain's experience with the COVID-19 pandemic and requested an investigation into Spain's handling of the pandemic.

== Selected publications ==
- Saveanu, Loredana; Carroll, Oliver; Lindo, Vivian; Del Val, Margarita; Lopez, Daniel; Lepelletier, Yves; Greer, Fiona; Schomburg, Lutz; Fruci, Doriana; Niedermann, Gabriele; van Endert, Peter M. (2005). "Concerted peptide trimming by human ERAP1 and ERAP2 aminopeptidase complexes in the endoplasmic reticulum". Nature Immunology. 6 (7): 689–697. doi:10.1038/ni1208. ISSN 1529-2916. PMID 15908954. S2CID 31585869.
- Val, Margarita Del; Schlicht, Hans-Jürgen; Ruppert, Thomas; Reddehase, Matthias J.; Koszinowski, Ulrich H. (20 September 1991). "Efficient processing of an antigenic sequence for presentation by MHC class I molecules depends on its neighboring residues in the protein". Cell. 66 (6): 1145–1153. doi:10.1016/0092-8674(91)90037-Y. ISSN 0092-8674. PMID 1913805. S2CID 24252836.
- del Val, M; Hengel, H; Häcker, H; Hartlaub, U; Ruppert, T; Lucin, P; Koszinowski, U H (1 September 1992). "Cytomegalovirus prevents antigen presentation by blocking the transport of peptide-loaded major histocompatibility complex class I molecules into the medial-Golgi compartment". Journal of Experimental Medicine. 176 (3): 729–738. doi:10.1084/jem.176.3.729. ISSN 0022-1007. PMC 2119349. PMID 1324970.

== Awards and honors ==
In 2015 del Val was named a corresponding academician of the Royal Academy of Pharmacy. In 2021 she received the "Medalla de Honor a los Valores Sociales" from Menéndez Pelayo International University for her work in Spain during the COVID-19 pandemic. Miguel Hernández University (UMH) awarded del Val Latorre an honorary doctorate in 2025

== Personal life ==
del Val is married to the biologist Enrique J. de la Rosa, who she met at the UAM in 1977. She has a son and daughter.
