= Viktor Ivanovich Spitsyn =

Soviet chemist (1902–1988)

- Born: 25 April 1902; Moscow, Russian Empire
- Died: 30 January 1988 (aged 85); Moscow, Soviet Union
- Resting place: Novodevichy Cemetery
- Awards: Hero of Socialist Labour (1969); USSR State Prize (1986); Order of Lenin (four times); Order of the October Revolution; Order of the Red Banner of Labour
- Scientific career
- Fields: Inorganic chemistry, physical chemistry, radiochemistry
- Workplaces: Moscow State University; Frumkin Institute of Physical Chemistry and Electrochemistry

Viktor Ivanovich Spitsyn (Russian: Виктор Иванович Спицын; 25 April 1902 – 30 January 1988) was a Soviet chemist who specialised in inorganic, physical chemistry and radiochemistry. An academician of the USSR Academy of Sciences (1958), Hero of Socialist Labour (1969) and laureate of the USSR State Prize (1986), he was a member of the Saxon Academy of Sciences and Humanities, an honorary member of the Polish Chemical Society and an honorary doctor of Leipzig University and the University of Wrocław.

== Biography ==
=== Early life and education ===
Spitsyn was born in Moscow into a large family; his father worked in the administration of the Kuznetsov porcelain factories. He studied at the Moscow Practical Academy of Commercial Sciences, where its director, the chemist Alexander Reformatsky, awakened his interest in chemistry. At the age of sixteen he was working as a chemist at the Pokrovsky chemical plant. In 1922 he graduated from the Faculty of Physics and Mathematics of Moscow State University, and carried out his first research on the chemistry of rare elements under the guidance of Academician Ivan Kablukov.

=== Career ===
In the 1920s Spitsyn developed technologies for processing tungsten ores and taught inorganic chemistry at Moscow University and other institutions, becoming a professor in 1934. In 1928–1931, at the Institute of Applied Mineralogy and Non-Ferrous Metallurgy, he led research on the chemistry and technology of beryllium; production of the metal was organised in 1932, and Spitsyn became the plant's scientific director.

From 1932 to 1942 he headed the Department of Inorganic Chemistry at the Liebknecht Moscow State Pedagogical Institute. In 1938 he was awarded the Candidate of Sciences degree in chemistry without defending a dissertation, and in 1945 he defended his doctoral dissertation, "New Materials on the Chemistry of Caesium", receiving the degree of Doctor of Sciences in Chemistry.

From 1942 he was vice-rector for research at Moscow State University and head of its department of inorganic chemistry, which he led until the end of his life. In 1946 he became a corresponding member of the USSR Academy of Sciences. He helped to create a radiochemistry specialisation at the university's chemistry faculty, recruiting An. N. Nesmeyanov, M. S. Merkulova, K. B. Zaborenko and others; the laboratory they formed became a department of radiochemistry in 1961.

From 1954 Spitsyn was director of the Institute of Physical Chemistry of the USSR Academy of Sciences, where he set up a Laboratory of Radiochemical Research. He became a full member of the Academy in 1958 and in 1967 became editor-in-chief of the Russian Journal of Inorganic Chemistry. From 1963 he chaired the Academy's Scientific Council on Inorganic Chemistry, and in 1966–1972 he was a member of the Scientific Advisory Committee of the International Atomic Energy Agency. He repeatedly headed Soviet delegations to international congresses.

Spitsyn died in Moscow on 30 January 1988 and is buried at Novodevichy Cemetery.. In 2010 the Frumkin Institute established an annual Spitsyn Prize for young scientists working in radiochemistry.

== Scientific work ==
Spitsyn was one of the founders of the Soviet school of chemistry and technology of molybdenum, tungsten, tantalum, technetium and beryllium, and directed work on rhenium and the rare-earth elements. His processes for treating domestic rare-metal ores made it possible to produce molybdenum and tungsten wire for the electrical industry.

Together with L. I. Kashtanov, using tantalum pentoxide (Ta_{2}O_{5}), he discovered one of the first transport reactions, widely used for synthesising and purifying compounds. His ore-processing methods enabled the production of molybdenum and tungsten wire for the electrical industry.

In the 1930s he studied the chemistry of caesium, rubidium, niobium and tantalum; this work was later used to extract caesium-137 from uranium fission products. In the 1940s his department studied zirconium, hafnium, scandium, uranium and improved methods of chromatographic separation of lanthanides. The collection Research in the Chemistry of Uranium (1961) laid the scientific basis for processing uranium ores, and Spitsyn also contributed to the study of heteropoly compounds and coordination compounds.

To train radiochemists, he organised practical courses for Soviet and later foreign chemists, and in 1955 the first Soviet manual, Methods of Work with Radioactive Indicators, appeared. Under his direction, methods were developed for the underground disposal of radioactive solutions..

From 1953 he studied radioactive elements. The first weighable quantities of protactinium in the USSR were isolated, a technology was developed for extracting technetium-99 from nuclear-industry waste, and the divalent state of californium, einsteinium and fermium was discovered; he also took part in the discovery of heptavalent plutonium and neptunium.

== Personal life ==
Spitsyn's interest in radioactive elements arose in his student years under the influence of his elder brother Vladimir, a researcher of radioactivity who became a professor and died young of pneumonia.

== Selected works ==
Spitsyn published about 700 scientific publications.

- Methods of Work with Radioactive Indicators (1955)
- Physicochemical Properties of Radioactive Solids (1973)
- Artificial Radionuclides in Seawater (1975)
- Carbonyl Complexes of the Platinum Metals (1980)
- Technetium (1981)
- Radiolysis of Aqueous Solutions of Lanthanides and Actinides (1983)
- Electroplastic Deformation of Metals (1985)
- Electronic Structure of the Actinides (1986)

== Awards and honours ==
- Hero of Socialist Labour (1969), with the Order of Lenin and the gold "Hammer and Sickle" medal
- Four Orders of Lenin (1953, 1962, 1969, 1975); Order of the October Revolution (1972); Order of the Red Banner of Labour (1944)
- USSR State Prize (1986); Mendeleev Prize (1975); Mendeleev Gold Medal (1983); prize of the USSR Council of Ministers (1976)
- Medal "For Valiant Labour in the Great Patriotic War 1941–1945" (1946); Medal "In Commemoration of the 800th Anniversary of Moscow" (1948); Jubilee Medal "In Commemoration of the 100th Anniversary of the Birth of Vladimir Ilyich Lenin" (1970); silver (1974) and gold (1975) medals of the VDNKh
- Prizes of Glavnauka (1925), of the Committee for the Chemicalisation of the National Economy (1930) and of the Council under the Presidium of the USSR Academy of Sciences (1952); Certificate of Honour of the RSFSR Ministry of Education (1971)

== Bibliography ==
- Finashina, G. N. (1976). Виктор Иванович Спицын [Viktor Ivanovich Spitsyn]. Materials for the Bibliography of Scientists of the USSR. Chemical Sciences Series (in Russian). Vol. 56. Moscow: Nauka. 157 pp.
