= Rose Stern =

English teacher

- Born: 17 November 1869; Birmingham, England
- Died: 1953
- Education: Mason College
- Scientific career
- Fields: Chemistry
- Workplaces: North London Collegiate School for Ladies

Rose Stern (17 November 1869 – October 1953) was a teacher from Birmingham, England. She was science mistress at North London Collegiate School for Ladies. While a student at Mason College, she was the first woman student to become a member of the Institute of Chemistry of Great Britain & Ireland (later the Royal Institute of Chemistry). A proponent of grounding chemistry instruction in domestic science, she published A method of teaching chemistry in schools (with Alice Maude Hughes, 1906) and A short history of chemistry (1924).

== Early life and education ==
Rose Stern was born on 17 November 1869 in Birmingham, England, to Moritz Stern (born 1833) and Fanny Schwartz (born 1845), both of German origin. Her paternal grandparents were Marcus (1797-1869) and Flora (1800–1858) Stern. Rose was the third of seven children.

Stern graduated in 1889 from King Edward VI High School for Girls, Birmingham, one of the rare girls' schools then to offer a strong science curriculum. She then attended Mason College. She was the first woman student to become a member of the Mason College Chemical Society. At the associate level, three women members had preceded Stern after the club's formation in 1884: Emily Lloyd, Jessie Charles and Constance Naden.

Stern was also the first woman student to become a member of the Institute of Chemistry of Great Britain & Ireland (later the Royal Institute of Chemistry).

Stern is listed in the Register of Fellows, Associates and Students of the Institute of Chemistry as having been admitted as of 17 February 1893. Her address is given as 241, Bristol Road, Birmingham.

Stern received her B.Sc. from Mason College in 1894.

== Career ==
From 1897 to 1902, Stern worked as a science mistress at the County School, Bangor. In 1902, Stern became a science mistress at North London Collegiate School for Ladies (later "for Girls"). NLCS had been founded by Frances Mary Buss (1827-1894), whose father Robert Buss was the first science teacher at the school. Both Frances Mary Buss and her successor Sophie Willock (Dr. Sophie Bryant) emphasized the importance of teaching "real science".

The students at NLCS had a Science Club, whose founder and first president, the science mistress Grace Heath, had died in 1895. Soon after her arrival in 1902, Stern was elected President of the Science Club. The students also published their own hand-written illustrated science magazine, The Searchlight. This emphasis on science was extremely uncommon for girls' schools of that time. NLCS became a model for other girls' schools around the world.

In 1906, Stern and Alice Maude Hughes, a science mistress from L. C. C. Secondary School, Eltham, published A method of teaching chemistry in schools. They presented a series of experiments in chemistry that were suitable for children, requiring them to keep laboratory notebooks about their activities and questions, save samples, and work from familiar to unknown areas.

Stern, with others including Lilian Faithfull, Ida Freund, Charlotte Laurie, Jessie Charles White, and Arthur Smithells debated the proper teaching of science to girls. Stern argued for a blended approach to teaching in which pure chemistry and applied chemistry were presented using familiar substances from kitchen and food preparation. She suggested that using household chemicals in chemistry class would enable girls to better appreciate academic chemistry.

"Every good teacher in science in a girls' school should look for examples for experiments from substances which are known to the pupils, for example, there is no reason why washing soda should not be used instead of another carbonate, and Epsom salts as a type of sulphate."

There was considerable resistance to Stern and Smithells' idea that "domestic science" could involve enough science to be taken seriously. It is an approach that continues to be advocated.

In 1924, Stern published A short history of chemistry. She is credited on title page as "Rose Stern, B.Sc. Senior Science Mistress, North London Collegiate School for Girls".

"My object in writing this book is to supply a want I have long felt — a book suitable for the use of boys and girls beginning the study of chemistry,... for the books which have hitherto been written on this subject are too advanced for the use of young beginners... the want of a simple account of the labours and discoveries of the great chemists may have been felt in other schools by teachers as convinced as myself, that the study of chemistry is best approached along historic lines."

The idea of introducing chemistry to students through the history of major people and discoveries was novel. As one reviewer noted:

"We do not know of any History of Chemistry written expressly for use in schools; there is room, therefore, for such a work... it is a desirable book.

Stern is listed as having been a member of the staff at NLCS from 1902 to 1930. During her career at NLCS, Stern inspired generations of young women.

"Many Old North Londoners must have felt it as a personal loss when they heard of the death of Miss Stern. During her long time at the North London Collegiate School she taught Chemistry to many generations of girls, and also took a lively interest in various school activities, and was always a most helpful and approachable member of the Staff… Miss Stern was kind to new young members of Staff. She had a robust commonsense outlook and was passionately devoted to the school, and its traditions. She inaugurated the general pattern of Jewish prayers and took a great deal of trouble to make these prayers of real value to the Jewish girls."

According to the North London Collegiate School Magazine, Miss Stern broke one of her legs during the Second World War. After a period of increasing disability at her home in Fairwarp, she died in October 1953.

== Publications ==
- Hughes, Alice Maude; Stern, Rose (1906). A method of teaching chemistry in schools. Cambridge: University Press.
- Stern, Rose (1924). A short history of chemistry. London: Dent.
