= Timeline of chemical element discoveries =

List of history of chemical elements

The discoveries of the 118 chemical elements known to exist as of 2026 are presented here in chronological order. The elements are listed generally in the order in which each was first defined as the pure element, as the exact date of discovery of most elements cannot be accurately determined. There are plans to synthesize more elements, and it is not known how many elements are possible.

Each element's name, atomic number, year of first report, name of the discoverer, and notes related to the discovery are listed.

== Periodic table of elements ==
Periodic table by era of discovery
	1	2		3	4	5	6	7	8	9	10	11	12	13	14	15	16	17	18
Group →
↓ Period
1	1 H																		2 He
2	3 Li	4 Be												5 B	6 C	7 N	8 O	9 F	10; Ne
3	11; Na	12; Mg												13; Al	14; Si	15; P	16; S	17; Cl	18; Ar
4	19; K	20; Ca		21; Sc	22; Ti	23; V	24; Cr	25; Mn	26; Fe	27; Co	28; Ni	29; Cu	30; Zn	31; Ga	32; Ge	33; As	34; Se	35; Br	36; Kr
5	37; Rb	38; Sr		39; Y	40; Zr	41; Nb	42; Mo	43; Tc	44; Ru	45; Rh	46; Pd	47; Ag	48; Cd	49; In	50; Sn	51; Sb	52; Te	53; I	54; Xe
6	55; Cs	56; Ba	1 asterisk	71; Lu	72; Hf	73; Ta	74; W	75; Re	76; Os	77; Ir	78; Pt	79; Au	80; Hg	81; Tl	82; Pb	83; Bi	84; Po	85; At	86; Rn
7	87; Fr	88; Ra	1 asterisk	103; Lr	104; Rf	105; Db	106; Sg	107; Bh	108; Hs	109; Mt	110; Ds	111; Rg	112; Cn	113; Nh	114; Fl	115; Mc	116; Lv	117; Ts	118; Og
1 asterisk				57; La	58; Ce	59; Pr	60; Nd	61; Pm	62; Sm	63; Eu	64; Gd	65; Tb	66; Dy	67; Ho	68; Er	69; Tm	70; Yb
1 asterisk				89; Ac	90; Th	91; Pa	92; U	93; Np	94; Pu	95; Am	96; Cm	97; Bk	98; Cf	99; Es	100; Fm	101; Md	102; No
Background color shows age of discovery: Antiquity to 1600 / 1600–1799 / 1800–1849 / 1850–1899 / 1900–1949 / 1950–1999 / Since 2000; (14 elements); Antiquity to 1600: ancient to early modern discoveries / (27 elements); Discoveries during the Scientific Revolution and the Age of Enlightenment, part of the gradual rejection of the Aristotelian theory of matter, and Lavoisier's definition of a chemical element / (19 elements); The chemical and industrial revolutions lead to the standardization of chemical techniques and the development of atomic theory for chemistry / (23 elements); The age of classifying elements and Mendeleev's periodic table; application of spectrum analysis techniques: Boisbaudran, Bunsen, Crookes, Kirchhoff, and others "hunting emission line signatures" / (14 elements); Developments in X-ray spectroscopy and radiochemistry allows for many radioactive elements and the final stable elements to be discovered; recognition of the atomic number as defining an element / (16 elements); Post Manhattan Project; synthesis of atomic numbers 98 and above (colliders, bombardment techniques, nuclear reactors) / (5 elements); Recent synthesis; Primordial From decay Synthetic Border shows natural occurrence of the element

== Cumulative diagram ==
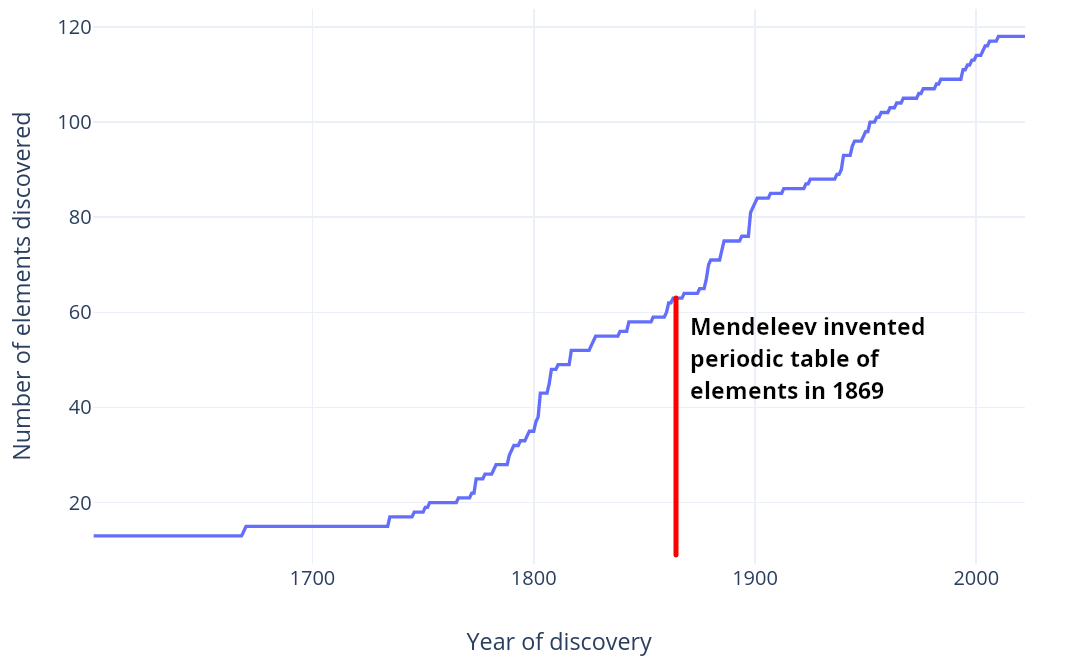
Cumulative diagram of element discoveries

== Pre-modern and early modern discoveries ==
Z	Element	Earliest use	Oldest existing sample	Discoverer(s)	Place of oldest sample	Notes
79	Gold	40000 BC	4600 BC – 4200 BC	Earliest humans	Varna Necropolis	Small amounts of natural gold have been found in Spanish caves used during the late Paleolithic period, c. 40000 BC. The earliest gold artifacts dating to 4600 BC to 4200 BC were discovered at the site of Varna Necropolis, Bulgaria. Recognised as an element by Guyton de Morveau, Lavoisier, Berthollet, and Fourcroy in 1787.
6	Carbon	26000 BC	26000 BC	Earliest humans		Charcoal and soot were known to the earliest humans, with the oldest known charcoal paintings dating to about 28000 years ago, e.g. Gabarnmung in Australia. The earliest known industrial use of charcoal was for the reduction of copper, zinc, and tin ores in the manufacture of bronze, by the Egyptians and Sumerians. Diamonds were probably known as early as 2500 BC. True chemical analyses were made in the 18th century, and in 1772 Antoine Lavoisier demonstrated that diamond, graphite, and charcoal are all composed of the same substance. In 1787, de Morveau, Fourcroy, and Lavoisier listed carbon (in French, carbone) as an element, distinguishing it from coal (in French, charbon).
29	Copper	9000 BC	6000 BC	Middle East	Asia Minor	It was originally obtained as a native metal and later from the smelting of ores. Earliest estimates of the discovery of copper suggest around 9000 BC in the Middle East. It was one of the most important materials to humans throughout the Chalcolithic and Bronze Ages. Copper beads dating from 6000 BC have been found in Çatalhöyük, Anatolia and the archaeological site of Belovode on the Rudnik mountain in Serbia contains the world's oldest securely dated evidence of copper smelting from 5000 BC. Recognised as an element by Louis Guyton de Morveau, Antoine Lavoisier, Claude Berthollet, and Antoine-François de Fourcroy in 1787.
82	Lead	7000 BC	3800 BC	Asia Minor	Abydos, Egypt	It is believed that lead smelting began at least 9,000 years ago, and the oldest known artifact of lead is a statuette found at the temple of Osiris on the site of Abydos dated around 3800 BC. Recognised as an element by Guyton de Morveau, Lavoisier, Berthollet, and Fourcroy in 1787.
47	Silver	Before 5000 BC	ca. 4000 BC	Asia Minor	Asia Minor	Estimated to have been discovered in Asia Minor shortly after copper and gold. Recognised as an element by Guyton de Morveau, Lavoisier, Berthollet, and Fourcroy in 1787.
26	Iron	Before 5000 BC	4000 BC	Middle East	Egypt	There is evidence that iron was known from before 5000 BC. The oldest known iron objects used by humans are some beads of meteoric iron, made in Egypt in about 4000 BC. The discovery of smelting around 3000 BC led to the start of the Iron Age around 1200 BC and the prominent use of iron for tools and weapons. Recognised as an element by Guyton de Morveau, Lavoisier, Berthollet, and Fourcroy in 1787.
50	Tin	3500 BC	2000 BC	Asia Minor	Kestel	First smelted in combination with copper around 3500 BC to produce bronze (and thus giving place to the Bronze Age in those places where Iron Age did not intrude directly on Neolithic of the Stone Age). Kestel, in southern Turkey, is the site of an ancient Cassiterite mine that was used from 3250 to 1800 BC. The oldest artifacts date from around 2000 BC. Recognised as an element by Guyton de Morveau, Lavoisier, Berthollet, and Fourcroy in 1787.
51	Antimony	3000 BC	3000 BC	Sumerians	Middle East	An artifact, said to be part of a vase, made of very pure antimony dating to about 3000 BC was found at Telloh, Chaldea (part of present-day Iraq). Dioscorides and Pliny both describe the accidental production of metallic antimony from stibnite, but only seem to recognize the metal as lead. The intentional isolation of antimony is described in the works attributed to the Muslim alchemist Jabir ibn Hayyan (c. 850–950). In Europe, the metal was being produced and used by 1540, when it was described by Vannoccio Biringuccio. Described again by Georgius Agricola De re metallica in 1556. Probably first recognised as an element by Lavoisier in 1787.
16	Sulfur	Before 2000 BC		Middle East	Middle East	First used at least 4,000 years ago. According to the Ebers Papyrus, a sulfur ointment was used in ancient Egypt to treat granular eyelids. (The Ebers papyrus was written c. 1550 BC, but is believed to have been copied from earlier texts.) Designated as one of the two elements of which all metals are composed in the sulfur-mercury theory of metals, first described in pseudo-Apollonius of Tyana's Sirr al-khaliqa ('Secret of Creation') and in the works attributed to Jabir ibn Hayyan (both 8th or 9th century). Designated as a universal element (one of the tria prima) by Paracelsus in the early 16th century. Recognized as an element by Lavoisier in 1777, which was supported by John Dalton in 1808 and confirmed by Joseph Gay-Lussac and Louis Jacques Thénard in 1810.
80	Mercury	1500 BC	1500 BC	Egyptians	Egypt	Cinnabar (the most common mineral form of mercury(II) sulfide, HgS) was used as a pigment from prehistory, dating as far back as the 9th millennium BC in the Middle East. Cinnabar deposits in Turkey, exploited from 8000 years ago, also contain minor amounts of mercury metal. Found in Egyptian tombs dating from 1500 BC. Recognised as an element, first by medieval alchemists, and later by Guyton de Morveau, Lavoisier, Berthollet, and Fourcroy in 1787.
30	Zinc	Before 1000 BC	1000 BC	Indian metallurgists	Indian subcontinent	Used as a component of brass since antiquity (before 1000 BC) by Indian metallurgists, but its true nature was not generally understood in ancient times. A 4th century BC vase from Taxila is made of brass with a zinc content of 34%, too high to be produced by cementation, providing strong evidence that metallic zinc was known in India by the 4th century BC. Zinc smelting was done in China and India around 1300. Identified as a distinct metal in the Rasaratna Samuccaya around the 14th century CE and by the alchemist Paracelsus in 1526, who gave it its present name and described it as a new metal. P. M. de Respour isolated it from zinc oxide in 1668; the first detailed documentation of zinc isolation was given by Andreas Sigismund Marggraf in 1746.
78	Platinum	c. 600 BC – AD 200	c. 600 BC – AD 200	Pre-Columbian South Americans	South America	Used by pre-Columbian Americans near modern-day Esmeraldas, Ecuador to produce artifacts of a white gold-platinum alloy, although precise dating is difficult. A small box from the burial of the Pharaoh Shepenupet II (died around 650 BC) was found to be decorated with gold-platinum hieroglyphics, but the Egyptians may not have recognised that there was platinum in their gold. First European description of a metal found in South American gold was in 1557 by Julius Caesar Scaliger. Antonio de Ulloa was on an expedition to Peru in 1735, where he observed the metal; he published his findings in 1748. Charles Wood also investigated the metal in 1741. First reference to it as a new metal was made by William Brownrigg in 1750.
33	Arsenic	c. AD 300	c. AD 300	Egyptians	Middle East	The use of metallic arsenic was described by the Egyptian alchemist Zosimos. The purification of arsenic was later described in the works attributed to the Muslim alchemist Jabir ibn Hayyan (c. 850–950). Albertus Magnus (c. 1200–1280) is typically credited with the description of the metal in the West, though some question his work and instead credit Vannoccio Biringuccio, whose De la pirotechnia (1540) distinguishes orpiment from crystalline arsenic. The first to unquestionably have prepared metallic arsenic was Johann Schröder in 1641. Recognised as an element after Lavoisier's definition in 1787.
83	Bismuth	c. 1500	c. 1500	European alchemists and Inca civilisation	Europe and South America	Bismuth was known since ancient times, but often confused with tin and lead, which are chemically similar. The Incas used bismuth (along with the usual copper and tin) in a special bronze alloy for knives, likely intentionally. Agricola (1530 and 1546) states that bismuth is a distinct metal in a family of metals including tin and lead. This was based on observation of the metals and their physical properties. Miners in the age of alchemy also gave bismuth the name tectum argenti, or "silver being made" in the sense of silver still in the process of being formed within the Earth. Beginning with Johann Heinrich Pott in 1738, Carl Wilhelm Scheele, and Torbern Olof Bergman, the distinctness of lead and bismuth became clear, and Claude François Geoffroy demonstrated in 1753 that this metal is distinct from lead and tin.

== Modern discoveries ==
For 18th-century discoveries, around the time that Antoine Lavoisier first questioned the phlogiston theory, the recognition of a new "earth" has been regarded as being equivalent to the discovery of a new element (as was the general practice then). For some elements (e.g. Be, B, Na, Mg, Al, Si, K, Ca, Mn, Co, Ni, Zr, Mo), this presents further difficulties as their compounded forms were widely known since medieval or even ancient times, even though the elements as "elemental" constituents of those compounds were not. Since the true nature of those compounds was sometimes only gradually discovered, it is sometimes very difficult to name one specific discoverer. In such cases the first publication on their chemistry is noted, and a longer explanation given in the notes.

Z	Element	Observed		Isolated (widely known)		Notes
Z	Element	Year	By	Year	By	Notes
15	Phosphorus	1669	H. Brand	1669	H. Brand	Prepared and isolated from urine, it was the first element whose discovery date and discoverer are recorded. Its name first appears in print in the work of Georg Kaspar Kirchmaier in 1676. Recognised as an element by Lavoisier.
1	Hydrogen	1671	R. Boyle	1671	R. Boyle	Robert Boyle produced it by reacting iron filings with dilute acid. Henry Cavendish in 1766 was the first to distinguish H_{2} from other gases. Lavoisier named it in 1783. It was the first elemental gas known.
11	Sodium	1702	G. E. Stahl	1807	H. Davy	Georg Ernst Stahl obtained experimental evidence that led him to suggest the fundamental difference of sodium and potassium salts in 1702, and Henri Louis Duhamel du Monceau was able to prove this difference in 1736. Andreas Sigismund Marggraf again recognised the difference between soda ash and potash in 1758, but not all chemists accepted his conclusion. In 1797, Martin Heinrich Klaproth suggested the names natron and kali for the two alkalis (whence the symbols). Davy isolated sodium metal a few days after potassium, by using electrolysis on sodium hydroxide and potash respectively.
19	Potassium	1702	G. E. Stahl	1807	H. Davy	
27	Cobalt	1735	G. Brandt	1735	G. Brandt	Proved that the blue color of glass is due to a new kind of metal and not bismuth as thought previously.
20	Calcium	1739	J. H. Pott	1808	H. Davy	Lime was known as a substance for centuries, but only in the 18th century was its chemical nature recognised. Pott recognised terra calcarea (calcareous earth) as an individual "earth" in his treatise of 1739. Guyton de Morveau, Lavoisier, Berthollet, and Fourcroy suggested in 1787 that it was the oxide of an element. Davy isolated the metal electrochemically from quicklime.
14	Silicon	1739	J. H. Pott	1823	J. Berzelius	Silicon compounds (rock crystals and glass) were known to the ancients, but its chemical investigation dates only to the 17th century. Johann Joachim Becher (of the phlogiston theory) identified silica as the terra vitrescibilis, and Johann Heinrich Pott recognised it as an individual "earth" in his treatise of 1739. Silica appears as a "simple earth" in the Méthode de nomenclature chimique, and in 1789 Lavoisier concluded that the element must exist. Davy thought in 1800 that silica was a compound, not an element, and in 1808 he suggested the name silicium. In 1811 Louis-Joseph Gay-Lussac and Louis-Jacques Thénard probably prepared impure silicon, and Berzelius obtained the pure element in 1823. The name was proposed to be changed to silicon by Thomas Thomson in 1817, and this was eventually accepted because of its analogies to boron and carbon.
13	Aluminium	1746	J. H. Pott	1825	H.C.Ørsted	Paracelsus recognised aluminis as separate from vitriol in 1570, and Andreas Libavius proposed in his 1597 treatise to name the unknown earth of alum alumina. In 1746, Johann Heinrich Pott published a treatise distinguishing alum from lime and chalk, and Marggraf precipitated the new earth in 1756. Antoine Lavoisier predicted in 1787 that alumina is the oxide of an undiscovered element, and in 1808 Davy tried to decompose it. Although he failed, he suggested the present name. Hans Christian Ørsted was the first to isolate metallic aluminium in 1825. However, some scientists questioned his isolation. The first undisputed isolation of aluminium was done by Friedrich Wöhler in 1827.
28	Nickel	1751	F. Cronstedt	1751	F. Cronstedt	Found by attempting to extract copper from the mineral known as fake copper (now known as niccolite).
12	Magnesium	1755	J. Black	1808	H. Davy	Joseph Black observed that magnesia alba (MgO) was not quicklime (CaO) in 1755; until then, both substances had been confused. Davy isolated the metal electrochemically from magnesia.
25	Manganese	1770	T. O. Bergman	1774	J. G. Gahn	Torbern Olof Bergman distinguished pyrolusite as the calx of a new metal, but failed to reduce it. Ignatius Gottfred Kaim might have isolated it in 1770, but there is uncertainty on that. It was isolated by reduction of manganese dioxide with carbon. Given its present name in 1779 by Guyton de Morveau; prior to that it was called magnesia.
9	Fluorine	1771	W. Scheele	1886	H. Moissan	Fluorspar was described by Georgius Agricola in 1529. Scheele studied fluorspar and correctly concluded it to be the lime (calcium) salt of an acid. Radical fluorique appears on the list of elements in Lavoisier's Traité Élémentaire de Chimie from 1789, but radical muriatique also appears instead of chlorine. André-Marie Ampère again predicted in 1810 that hydrofluoric acid contained an element analogous to chlorine, and between 1812 and 1886 many researchers tried to obtain it. It was eventually isolated by Moissan.
8	Oxygen	1771	W. Scheele	1771	W. Scheele	Scheele obtained it by heating mercuric oxide and nitrates in 1771, but did not publish his findings until 1777. Joseph Priestley also prepared this new air by 1774, but only Lavoisier recognized it as a true element; he named it in 1777. Before him, Sendivogius had produced oxygen by heating saltpetre, correctly identifying it as the "food of life".
7	Nitrogen	1772	D. Rutherford	1772	D. Rutherford	Rutherford discovered nitrogen while studying at the University of Edinburgh. He showed that the air in which animals had breathed, even after removal of the exhaled carbon dioxide, was no longer able to burn a candle. Carl Wilhelm Scheele, Henry Cavendish, and Joseph Priestley also studied the element at about the same time, and Lavoisier named it in 1775–6.
56	Barium	1772	W. Scheele	1808	H. Davy	Scheele distinguished a new earth (BaO) in baryte in 1772. He did not name his discovery; Guyton de Morveau suggested barote in 1782. It was changed to baryte in the Méthode de nomenclature chimique of Louis-Bernard Guyton de Morveau, Antoine Lavoisier, Claude Louis Berthollet, and Antoine François, comte de Fourcroy (1787). Davy isolated the metal by electrolysis.
17	Chlorine	1774	W. Scheele	1774	W. Scheele	Obtained it from hydrochloric acid, but thought it was an oxide. Only in 1810 did Humphry Davy recognize it as an element.
42	Molybdenum	1778	W. Scheele	1788	J. Hjelm	Scheele recognised the metal as a constituent of molybdena. Before that, Axel Cronstedt had assumed that molybdena contained a new earth in 1758.
74	Tungsten	1781	W. Scheele	1783	J. and F. Elhuyar	Scheele showed that scheelite (then called tungsten) was a salt of calcium with a new acid, which he called tungstic acid. The Elhuyars obtained tungstic acid from wolframite and reduced it with charcoal, naming the element "wolfram". Since that time both names, tungsten and wolfram, have been used depending on language. In 1949 IUPAC made wolfram the scientific name, but this was repealed after protest in 1951 in favour of recognising both names pending a further review (which never materialised). Currently only tungsten is recognised for use in English.
52	Tellurium	1782	F.-J.M. von Reichenstein	1798	H. Klaproth	Muller observed it as an impurity in gold ores from Transylvania. Klaproth isolated it in 1798.
5	Boron	1787	L. Guyton de Morveau, A. Lavoisier, C. L. Berthollet, and A. de Fourcroy	1809	H. Davy	Borax was known from ancient times. In 1787, radical boracique appeared in the Méthode de nomenclature chimique of Louis-Bernard Guyton de Morveau, Antoine Lavoisier, Claude Louis Berthollet, and Antoine François, comte de Fourcroy. It also appears in Lavoisier's Traité Élémentaire de Chimie from 1789. In 1808, Lussac and Thénard announced a new element in sedative salt and named it bore. Davy announced the isolation of a new substance from boracic acid in 1809, naming it boracium. As the element turned out not to be a metal, he revised his proposal to boron in 1812.
		1789	A. Lavoisier			Lavoisier writes the first modern list of chemical elements – containing 33 elements including light and heat but omitting Na, K (he was unsure of whether soda and potash without carbonic acid, i.e. Na_{2}O and K_{2}O, are simple substances or compounds like NH_{3}), Te; some elements were listed in the table as unextracted "radicals" (Cl, F, B) or as oxides (Ca, Mg, Ba, Al, Si). He also redefines the term "element".
40	Zirconium	1789	H. Klaproth	1824	J. Berzelius	Martin Heinrich Klaproth identified a new oxide in zircon in 1789, and in 1808 Davy suggested the present name. The metal was first obtained by Berzelius in 1824.
92	Uranium	1789	H. Klaproth	1841	E.-M. Péligot	Klaproth mistakenly identified a uranium oxide obtained from pitchblende as the element itself and named it after the recently discovered planet Uranus.
38	Strontium	1790	A. Crawford	1808	H. Davy	Adair Crawford in 1790 found that strontianite (strontium carbonate) and witherite (barium carbonate) have different chemical properties, and suspected strontianite contained a new earth. Before him, strontianite is seen as a type of witherite. Strontium was eventually isolated electrochemically in 1808 by Davy.
22	Titanium	1791	W. Gregor	1875	D. K. Kirillov	Gregor found an oxide of a new metal in ilmenite; Klaproth independently discovered the element in rutile in 1795 and named it. In 1825, Jöns Jacob Berzelius claimed isolation of metallic titanium, but his substance did not react with hydrofluoric acid, whereas titanium does. In 1910, Matthew A. Hunter obtained metallic titanium of 99% purity.
39	Yttrium	1794	J. Gadolin	1843	H. Rose	Johan Gadolin discovered the earth in gadolinite in 1794. He did not name his discovery, but Anders Gustaf Ekeberg did so when he confirmed it in 1797. Wöhler mistakenly thought he had isolated the metal in 1828 from a volatile chloride he supposed to be yttrium chloride, but Rose proved otherwise in 1843 and correctly isolated the element himself that year.
24	Chromium	1797	N. Vauquelin	1798	N. Vauquelin	Vauquelin analysed the composition of crocoite ore in 1797, and later isolated the metal by heating the oxide in a charcoal oven.
4	Beryllium	1798	N. Vauquelin	1828	F. Wöhler and A. Bussy	Vauquelin discovered the oxide in beryl and emerald in 1798, and was uncertain about the name to give to it: in 1798 he called it la terre du beril, but the journal editors named it glucine after the sweet taste of beryllium compounds (which are highly toxic). Johann Heinrich Friedrich Link proposed in 1799 to change the name from Glucine to Beryllerde or Berylline, a suggestion taken up by Klaproth in 1800 in the form beryllina. Klaproth had independently worked on beryl and emerald and likewise concluded that a new element was present. Davy in 1808 suggested the name glucium. The name beryllium for the element was first used by Wöhler upon its isolation. Both names beryllium and glucinium were used (the latter mostly in France) until IUPAC decided on the name beryllium in 1949.
23	Vanadium	1801	A. M. del Río	1867	H. E. Roscoe	Andrés Manuel del Río found the metal (calling it erythronium) in vanadinite in 1801, but the claim was rejected after Hippolyte Victor Collet-Descotils dismissed it as chromium based on erroneous and superficial testing. Nils Gabriel Sefström rediscovered the element in 1830 and named it vanadium. Friedrich Wöhler then showed that vanadium was identical to erythronium and thus that del Río had been right in the first place. Del Río then argued passionately that his old claim be recognised, but the element kept the name vanadium. Roscoe eventually produced the metal in 1867 by reduction of vanadium(II) chloride, VCl_{2}, with hydrogen.
41	Niobium	1801	C. Hatchett	1864	W. Blomstrand	Hatchett found the element in columbite ore and named it columbium. In 1809, W. H. Wollaston claimed that columbium and tantalum are identical, which proved to be false. Heinrich Rose proved in 1844 that the element is distinct from tantalum, and renamed it niobium. American scientists generally used the name columbium, while European ones used niobium. Niobium was officially accepted by IUPAC in 1949.
73	Tantalum	1802	G. Ekeberg	1864	J.C.G. de Marignac	Ekeberg found another element in minerals similar to columbite, and named it after Tantalus from Greek mythology because of its inability to be dissolved by acids (just as Tantalus was tantalised by water that receded when he tried to drink it). In 1809, W. H. Wollaston claimed that columbium and tantalum are identical, which proved to be false. In 1844, Heinrich Rose proved that the elements were distinct and renamed columbium to niobium (Niobe is the daughter of Tantalus). De Marignac's sample contained impurities; relatively pure tantalum was produced by Werner von Bolton in 1903.
46	Palladium	1802	W. H. Wollaston	1802	W. H. Wollaston	Wollaston discovered it in samples of platinum from South America, but did not publish his results immediately. He had intended to name it after the newly discovered asteroid, Ceres, but by the time he published his results in 1804, cerium had taken that name. Wollaston named it after the more recently discovered asteroid Pallas.
58	Cerium	1803	H. Klaproth, W. Hisinger, and J. Berzelius	1875	W. F. Hillebrand and T. H. Norton	Hisinger and Berzelius discovered a new earth in cerite, considered it to be an oxide of a new element and named the element after the newly discovered asteroid (then considered a planet), Ceres. Klaproth discovered it simultaneously and independently in some tantalum samples. Mosander (1825) and Wöhler (1867) claimed to have isolated metallic cerium, but their samples were rather impure.
76	Osmium	1803	S. Tennant	1803	S. Tennant	Tennant had been working on samples of South American platinum in parallel with Wollaston and discovered two new elements, which he named osmium and iridium, and published the iridium results in 1804. Collet-Descotils also found iridium the same year, but not osmium.
77	Iridium	1803	S. Tennant and H.-V. Collet-Descotils	1803	S. Tennant	Tennant had been working on samples of South American platinum in parallel with Wollaston and discovered two new elements, which he named osmium and iridium, and published the iridium results in 1804. Collet-Descotils also found iridium the same year, but not osmium.
45	Rhodium	1804	H. Wollaston	1804	H. Wollaston	Wollaston discovered and isolated it from crude platinum samples from South America.
53	Iodine	1811	B. Courtois	1811	B. Courtois	Courtois discovered it in the ashes of seaweed. The name iode was given in French by Gay-Lussac and published in 1813. Davy gave it the English name iodine in 1814.
3	Lithium	1817	A. Arfwedson	1821	W. T. Brande	Arfwedson, a student of Berzelius, discovered the alkali in petalite. Brande isolated it electrolytically from lithium oxide.
48	Cadmium	1817	S. L Hermann, F. Stromeyer, and J.C.H. Roloff	1817	S. L Hermann, F. Stromeyer, and J.C.H. Roloff	All three found an unknown metal in a sample of zinc oxide from Silesia, but the name that Stromeyer gave became the accepted one.
34	Selenium	1817	J. Berzelius and G. Gahn	1817	J. Berzelius and G. Gahn	While working with lead they discovered a substance that they thought was tellurium, but realized after more investigation that it was different.
35	Bromine	1825	J. Balard and C. Löwig	1825	J. Balard and C. Löwig	They both discovered the element in the autumn of 1825. Balard published his results the next year, but Löwig did not publish until 1827.
90	Thorium	1829	J. Berzelius	1914	D. Lely, Jr. and L. Hamburger	Berzelius obtained a new earth (the oxide of a new element) in thorite.
57	Lanthanum	1838	G. Mosander	1904	W. Muthmann, L. Weiss	Mosander found a new earth in samples of ceria in 1838.
60	Neodymium	1841	G. Mosander	1901	W. Muthmann, H. Hofer, L. Weiss	Discovered by Mosander and called didymium. Carl Auer von Welsbach later split it into two elements, praseodymium and neodymium. Neodymium had formed the greater part of the old didymium and received the prefix "neo-".
68	Erbium	1843	G. Mosander	1934	W. Klemm and H. Bommer	Mosander managed to split the old yttria into yttria proper, erbia, and terbia. The names underwent some confusion: Mosander's erbia was yellow and his terbia was red. But in 1860, Nils Johan Berlin could only find the rose-coloured earth, confusingly renamed as erbia, and questioned the existence of the yellow earth. Marc Delafontaine adopted Berlin's nomenclature where erbia was the rose-coloured earth, but proved in 1878 that the yellow earth also existed. At the prompting of Jean Charles Galissard de Marignac, he named the yellow earth terbia; thus Mosander's names were swapped from his original choices.
65	Terbium	1843	G. Mosander	1937	W. Klemm and H. Bommer	
44	Ruthenium	1844	K. Claus	1844	K. Claus	Gottfried Wilhelm Osann thought that he found three new metals in Russian platinum samples in 1826, which he named polinium, pluranium, and ruthenium in 1828. But his results were questioned and he did not have enough quantities to isolate them, so he withdrew his claims in 1829. However, in 1844 Karl Karlovich Klaus confirmed that there was one new metal, and reused Osann's name "ruthenium".
55	Caesium	1860	G. R. Kirchhoff and R. Bunsen	1882	C. Setterberg	Kirchhoff and Bunsen were the first to suggest finding new elements by spectrum analysis. They discovered caesium by its two blue emission lines in a sample of Dürkheim mineral water. The pure metal was eventually isolated in 1882 by Setterberg.
37	Rubidium	1861	G. R. Kirchhoff and R. Bunsen	1863	R. Bunsen	Kirchhoff and Bunsen discovered it just a few months after caesium, by observing new spectral lines in the mineral lepidolite. The metal was isolated by Bunsen around 1863.
81	Thallium	1861	W. Crookes	1862	C.-A. Lamy	Shortly after the discovery of rubidium, Crookes found a new green line in a selenium sample; later that year, Lamy found the element to be metallic.
49	Indium	1863	F. Reich and T. Richter	1864	T. Richter	Reich and Richter first identified it in sphalerite by its bright indigo-blue spectroscopic emission line. Richter isolated the metal the next year.
2	Helium	1868	N. Lockyer	1895	W. Ramsay, T. Cleve, and N. Langlet	P. Janssen and Lockyer observed independently a yellow line in the solar spectrum that did not match any other element. However, only Lockyer made the correct conclusion that it was due to a new element. This was the first observation of a noble gas, located in the Sun. Years later after the isolation of argon on Earth, Ramsay, Cleve, and Langlet observed independently helium trapped in cleveite.
		1869	D. I. Mendeleev			Mendeleev arranges the 63 elements known at that time (omitting terbium, as chemists were unsure of its existence, and helium, as it was not found on Earth) into the first modern periodic table and correctly predicts several others.
31	Gallium	1875	P. E. L. de Boisbaudran	1878	P. E. L. de Boisbaudran and E. Jungfleisch	Boisbaudran observed on a pyrenea blende sample some emission lines corresponding to the eka-aluminium that was predicted by Mendeleev in 1871. He and Jungfleisch isolated the metal three years later by electrolysis.
70	Ytterbium	1878	J.C.G. de Marignac	1936	W. Klemm and H. Bommer	On 22 October 1878, Marignac reported splitting erbia (Mosander's terbia) into two new earths, erbia proper and ytterbia.
67	Holmium	1878	J.-L. Soret and M. Delafontaine	1939	H. Bommer	Soret found it in samarskite and later, Per Teodor Cleve split Marignac's erbia into erbia proper and two new elements, thulium and holmium. Delafontaine's philippium turned out to be identical to what Soret found.
21	Scandium	1879	F. Nilson	1937	W. Fischer, K. Brünger, H. Grieneisen	Nilson split Marignac's ytterbia into pure ytterbia and a new element that matched Mendeleev's 1871 predicted eka-boron.
69	Thulium	1879	T. Cleve	1936	W. Klemm and H. Bommer	Cleve split Marignac's erbia into erbia proper and two new elements, thulium and holmium.
62	Samarium	1879	P.E.L. de Boisbaudran	1903	W. Muthmann	Boisbaudran noted a new earth in samarskite and named it samaria after the mineral.
64	Gadolinium	1880	J. C. G. de Marignac	1935	Félix Trombe	Marignac initially observed the new earth in terbia, and later Boisbaudran obtained a pure sample from samarskite.
59	Praseodymium	1885	C. A. von Welsbach	1904	W. Muthmann, L. Weiss	Carl Auer von Welsbach discovered it in Mosander's didymia.
32	Germanium	1886	C. A. Winkler	1886	C. A. Winkler	In February 1886 Winkler found in argyrodite the eka-silicon that Mendeleev had predicted in 1871.
66	Dysprosium	1886	P.E.L. de Boisbaudran	1937	W. Klemm and H. Bommer	De Boisbaudran found a new earth in erbia.
18	Argon	1894	Lord Rayleigh and W. Ramsay	1894	Lord Rayleigh and W. Ramsay	They discovered the gas by comparing the molecular weights of nitrogen prepared by liquefaction from air and nitrogen prepared by chemical means. It is the first noble gas to be isolated.
63	Europium	1896	E.-A. Demarçay	1937	W. Klemm and H. Bommer	Demarçay found spectral lines of a new element in Lecoq's samarium, provisionally designated the element as Σ, and gave it its present name in 1901. Metallic europium was isolated in 1937.
36	Krypton	1898	W. Ramsay and W. Travers	1898	W. Ramsay and W. Travers	On May 30, 1898, Ramsay separated a noble gas from liquid argon by difference in boiling point.
10	Neon	1898	W. Ramsay and W. Travers	1898	W. Ramsay and W. Travers	In June 1898 Ramsay separated a new noble gas from liquid argon by difference in boiling point.
54	Xenon	1898	W. Ramsay and W. Travers	1898	W. Ramsay and W. Travers	After neon, Ramsay separated a third noble gas from liquid argon by difference in boiling point.
84	Polonium	1898	P. and M. Curie	1946	W. H. Beamer and C. R. Maxwell	In an experiment done on 13 July 1898, the Curies noted an increased radioactivity in the uranium obtained from pitchblende, which they ascribed to an unknown element. Independently rediscovered and isolated in 1902 by Marckwald, who named it radiotellurium. Pure polonium was obtained in 1946.
88	Radium	1898	P. and M. Curie	1910	Marie Curie and André-Louis Debierne	The Curies reported on 26 December 1898, a new element different from polonium, which Marie later isolated from uraninite. In September 1910, Marie Curie and André-Louis Debierne announced that they had isolated radium as a pure metal.
86	Radon	1899	E. Rutherford and R. B. Owens	1910	W. Ramsay and R. Whytlaw-Gray	Rutherford and Owens discovered a radioactive gas resulting from the radioactive decay of thorium, isolated later by Ramsay and Gray. In 1900, Friedrich Ernst Dorn discovered a longer-lived isotope of the same gas from the radioactive decay of radium. Since "radon" was first used to specifically designate Dorn's isotope before it became the name for the element, he is often mistakenly given credit for the latter instead of the former.
89	Actinium	1902	F. O. Giesel	1955	Joseph G. Stites, Murrell L. Salutsky, Bob D. Stone	Giesel obtained from pitchblende a substance that had properties similar to those of lanthanum and named it emanium. André-Louis Debierne had previously (in 1899 and 1900) reported the discovery of a new element actinium that was supposedly similar to titanium and thorium, which cannot have included much actual element 89. But by 1904, when Giesel and Debierne met, both had samples containing element 89, and so Debierne has generally been given credit for the discovery.
71	Lutetium	1906	C. A. von Welsbach and G. Urbain	1937	W. Klemm and H. Bommer	Von Welsbach proved that the old ytterbium also contained a new element, which he named cassiopeium (he renamed the larger part of the old ytterbium to aldebaranium). Urbain also proved this at about the same time (von Welsbach's paper was published first, but Urbain sent his to the editor first), naming the new element lutecium and the old one neoytterbium (which later reverted to ytterbium). However, Urbain's samples were very impure and only contained trace quantities of the new element. Despite this, Urbain's chosen name was adopted by the International Committee of Atomic Weights, whose membership included Urbain. The German Atomic Weights Commission adopted cassiopeium for the next forty years. Finally in 1949 IUPAC decided in favour of the name lutetium as it was more often used.
75	Rhenium	1908	M. Ogawa	1908	M. Ogawa	Masataka Ogawa found it in thorianite in 1908, but assigned it as element 43 and named it nipponium. (Elements 43 and 75 are in the same group of the periodic table.) Because of the erroneous assignment, and because some of his key results were published only in Japanese, his claim was not widely recognised. However, the optical emission spectrum described by Ogawa and the X-ray photographic plate for one of his samples match element 75, and his claim has thus been rehabilitated in much of the modern literature. In 1925 Walter Noddack, Ida Eva Tacke and Otto Berg announced its separation from gadolinite, identified it correctly as element 75, and gave it the present name.
91	Protactinium	1913	K. Fajans and O. H. Göhring	1934	A. von Grosse	The two obtained the first isotope, ^{234m}Pa, of this element, which had been predicted by Mendeleev in 1871, as a member of the natural decay of ^{238}U; they named it brevium. A longer-lived isotope ^{231}Pa was found in 1918 by Otto Hahn and Lise Meitner, and was named by them protactinium: since it is longer-lived, it gave the element its name. William Crookes in 1900 reported his discovery of the radioelement "uranium X", that later was proven to be mixture of uranium X_{1} (^{234}Th) and uranium X_{2} (^{234m}Pa).
72	Hafnium	1922	D. Coster and G. von Hevesy	1924	Anton Eduard van Arkel and Jan Hendrik de Boer	Georges Urbain claimed to have found the element in rare-earth residues, while Vladimir Vernadsky independently found it in orthite. Neither claim was confirmed due to World War I, and neither could be confirmed later, as the chemistry they reported does not match that now known for hafnium. After the war, Coster and Hevesy found it by X-ray spectroscopic analysis in Norwegian zircon. Anton Eduard van Arkel and Jan Hendrik de Boer were the first to prepare metallic hafnium by passing hafnium tetraiodide vapor over a heated tungsten filament in 1924. Hafnium was the last stable element to be discovered (noting however the difficulties regarding the discovery of rhenium).
43	Technetium	1937	C. Perrier and E. Segrè	1947	S. Fried	The two discovered a new element in a molybdenum sample that was used in a cyclotron, the first element to be discovered by synthesis. It had been predicted by Mendeleev in 1871 as eka-manganese. In 1952, Paul W. Merrill found its spectral lines in S-type red giants. Minuscule trace quantities were finally found on Earth in 1962 by B. T. Kenna and Paul K. Kuroda: they isolated it from Belgian Congo pitchblende, where it occurs as a spontaneous fission product of uranium. The Noddacks (rediscoverers of rhenium) claimed to have discovered element 43 in 1925 as well and named it masurium (after Masuria), but their claims were disproven by Kuroda, who calculated that there cannot have been enough technetium in their samples to have enabled a true detection.
87	Francium	1939	M. Perey			Perey discovered it as a decay product of ^{227}Ac. Francium was the last element to be discovered in nature, rather than synthesized in the lab, although four of the "synthetic" elements that were discovered later (plutonium, neptunium, astatine, and promethium) were eventually found in trace amounts in nature as well. Before Perey, it is likely that Stefan Meyer, Viktor F. Hess, and Friedrich Paneth had observed the decay of ^{227}Ac to ^{223}Fr in Vienna in 1914, but they could not follow up and secure their work because of the outbreak of World War I.
93	Neptunium	1940	E.M. McMillan and H. Abelson	1945	S. Fried	Obtained by irradiating uranium with neutrons, it was the first transuranium element discovered. Shortly before that, Yoshio Nishina and Kenjiro Kimura discovered the uranium isotope ^{237}U and found that it beta decays into ^{237}93, but were unable to measure the activity of the element 93 product because its half-life was too long. McMillan and Abelson succeeded because they used ^{239}U, as ^{239}93 has a much shorter half-life. McMillan and Abelson found that ^{239}93 itself undergoes beta decay and must produce an isotope of element 94, but the quantities they used were not enough to isolate and identify element 94 along with 93. Natural traces were found in Belgian Congo pitchblende by D. F. Peppard et al. in 1952.
85	Astatine	1940	D. R. Corson, K. R. MacKenzie and E. Segrè			Obtained by bombarding bismuth with alpha particles. In 1943, Berta Karlik and Traude Bernert found it in nature; due to World War II, they were initially unaware of Corson et al.'s results. Horia Hulubei and Yvette Cauchois had previously claimed its discovery as a natural radioelement from 1936, naming it dor: they likely did have the isotope ^{218}At, and probably did have enough sensitivity to distinguish its spectral lines. But they could not chemically identify their discovery, and their work was doubted because of an earlier false claim by Hulubei to having discovered element 87.
94	Plutonium	1941	Glenn T. Seaborg, Arthur C. Wahl, W. Kennedy and E.M. McMillan	1943	H. L. Baumbach, S. Fried, P. L. Kirk and, R. S. Rosenfels	Prepared by bombardment of uranium with deuterons. Seaborg and Morris L. Perlman then found it as traces in natural Canadian pitchblende in 1941–1942, though this work was kept secret until 1948. The first sample of plutonium metal was created from the reduction of plutonium trifluoride in November 1943.
96	Curium	1944	Glenn T. Seaborg, Ralph A. James and Albert Ghiorso	1950	J. C. Wallmann, W. W. T. Crane and B. B. Cunningham	Prepared by bombarding plutonium with alpha particles during the Manhattan Project. Curium metal was produced in 1950 by reduction of CmF_{3} with barium.
95	Americium	1944	G. T. Seaborg, R. A. James, O. Morgan and A. Ghiorso	1951	Edgar F. Westrum Jr. and LeRoy Eyring	Prepared by irradiating plutonium with neutrons during the Manhattan Project. Americium metal was produced in 1951 by reduction of AmF_{3} with barium.
61	Promethium	1945	Jacob A. Marinsky, Lawrence E. Glendenin, and Charles D. Coryell	1963	F. Weigel	It was probably first prepared at the Ohio State University in 1942 by bombarding neodymium and praseodymium with neutrons, but separation of the element could not be carried out. Isolation was performed under the Manhattan Project in 1945. The metal was later isolated by F. Weigel in 1963, by reducing promethium fluoride with lithium. Found on Earth in trace quantities by Olavi Erämetsä in 1965; so far, promethium is the most recent element to have been found on Earth.
97	Berkelium	1949	G. Thompson, A. Ghiorso and G. T. Seaborg (University of California, Berkeley)	1969	J. R. Peterson, J. A. Fahey, and R. D. Baybarz	Created by bombardment of americium with alpha particles.
98	Californium	1950	S. G. Thompson, K. Street, Jr., A. Ghiorso and G. T. Seaborg (University of California, Berkeley)	1974	R. G. Haire and R. D. Baybarz	Bombardment of curium with alpha particles. Californium metal was produced in 1974 by reduction of Cf_{2}O_{3} with lanthanum.
99	Einsteinium	1952	A. Ghiorso et al. (Argonne Laboratory, Los Alamos Laboratory and University of California, Berkeley)	1979	R. G. Haire and R. D. Baybarz	Formed in the first thermonuclear explosion in November 1952, by irradiation of uranium with neutrons; kept secret for several years. Einsteinium metal was produced in 1979 by reduction of Es_{2}O_{3} with lanthanum.
100	Fermium	1953	A. Ghiorso et al. (Argonne Laboratory, Los Alamos Laboratory and University of California, Berkeley)			Formed in the first thermonuclear explosion in November 1952, by irradiation of uranium with neutrons; first identified in early 1953; kept secret for several years.
101	Mendelevium	1955	A. Ghiorso, G. Harvey, G. R. Choppin, S. G. Thompson and G. T. Seaborg (Berkeley Radiation Laboratory)			Prepared by bombardment of einsteinium with alpha particles.
103	Lawrencium	1961	A. Ghiorso, T. Sikkeland, E. Larsh and M. Latimer (Berkeley Radiation Laboratory)			First prepared by bombardment of californium with boron atoms.
102	Nobelium	1965	E. D. Donets, V. A. Shchegolev and V. A. Ermakov (JINR in Dubna)			First prepared by bombardment of uranium with neon atoms. Its discovery was originally claimed by the Nobel Institute for Physics in 1957; although the claim was later retracted, their proposed name nobelium remains in use. Ghiorso's team at Berkeley claimed the discovery in 1958, but the first complete and incontrovertible report of its detection only came in 1966 from JINR in Dubna, on the basis of experiments done in 1965.
104	Rutherfordium	1969	A. Ghiorso et al. (Berkeley Radiation Laboratory) and I. Zvara et al. (JINR in Dubna)			Prepared by bombardment of californium with carbon atoms by Albert Ghiorso's team and by bombardment of plutonium with neon atoms by Zvara's team. JINR originally claimed the discovery in 1964 and named the element kurchatovium, but IUPAC did not consider this result sufficiently convincing.
105	Dubnium	1970	A. Ghiorso et al. (Berkeley Radiation Laboratory) and V. A. Druin et al. (JINR in Dubna)			Prepared by bombardment of californium with nitrogen atoms by Ghiorso's team and by bombardment of americium with neon atoms by Druin's team. JINR originally claimed the discovery in 1968 and named the element nielsbohrium, but IUPAC did not consider this result sufficiently convincing. Ghiorso's team proposed the name hahnium, but IUPAC ultimately adopted the name dubnium in 1997.
106	Seaborgium	1974	A. Ghiorso et al. (Berkeley Radiation Laboratory)			Prepared by bombardment of californium with oxygen atoms. JINR originally claimed the discovery in 1974, but IUPAC did not consider this result sufficiently convincing.
107	Bohrium	1981	G.Münzenberg et al. (GSI in Darmstadt)			Obtained by bombarding bismuth with chromium.
109	Meitnerium	1982	G. Münzenberg, P. Armbruster et al. (GSI in Darmstadt)			Prepared by bombardment of bismuth with iron atoms.
108	Hassium	1984	G. Münzenberg, P. Armbruster et al. (GSI in Darmstadt)			Prepared by bombardment of lead with iron atoms.
110	Darmstadtium	1994	S. Hofmann et al. (GSI in Darmstadt)			Prepared by bombardment of lead with nickel.
111	Roentgenium	1994	S. Hofmann et al. (GSI in Darmstadt)			Prepared by bombardment of bismuth with nickel.
112	Copernicium	1996	S. Hofmann et al. (GSI in Darmstadt)			Prepared by bombardment of lead with zinc.
114	Flerovium	1999	Y. Oganessian et al. (JINR in Dubna)			Prepared by bombardment of plutonium with calcium. It was likely observed earlier at Dubna in 1998, but that result has not been confirmed.
116	Livermorium	2000	Y. Oganessian et al. (JINR in Dubna)			Prepared by bombardment of curium with calcium.
118	Oganesson	2002	Y. Oganessian et al. (JINR in Dubna)			Prepared by bombardment of californium with calcium.
115	Moscovium	2003	Y. Oganessian et al. (JINR in Dubna)			Prepared by bombardment of americium with calcium.
113	Nihonium	2003–2004	Y. Oganessian et al. (JINR in Dubna) and K. Morita et al. (RIKEN in Wako, Japan)			Prepared by decay of moscovium by Oganessian's team and bombardment of bismuth with zinc by Morita's team. Both teams began their experiments in 2003; Oganessian's team detected its first atom in 2003, but Morita's only in 2004. However, both teams published in 2004.
117	Tennessine	2009	Y. Oganessian et al. (JINR in Dubna)			Prepared by bombardment of berkelium with calcium.

== See also ==
- History of the periodic table
- Periodic table
- Extended periodic table
- The Mystery of Matter: Search for the Elements (2014/2015 PBS film)
- Transfermium Wars
