= Harold G. Richter =

American nuclear chemist and analytical chemist

- Born: Harold Gene Richter; March 5, 1925; Fontanet, Indiana
- Died: July 19, 2001 (aged 76); Chapel Hill, North Carolina
- Education: Massachusetts Institute of Technology
- Known for: Nuclear chemistry, Air and water quality measurement methods
- Spouse: Marjorie Richter
- Scientific career
- Workplaces: Research Triangle Institute, United States Atomic Energy Commission, Environmental Protection Agency
- Doctoral advisor: Charles D. Coryell

Harold Gene Richter (March 5, 1925 - July 19, 2001) was an American chemist noted for his development of new analytical techniques for determination of water and air quality. Much of his career was spent at the Research Triangle Institute in Durham, North Carolina. Richter conducted research involving radioisotopes for the United States Atomic Energy Commission. He was a project officer for the Environmental Protection Agency, specializing in techniques for monitoring water and air quality. Richter developed new methods of analysis and monitoring during his tenure with both agencies.

Post-2000 sources suggesting that Richter had a role in the discovery of the element promethium in 1945 may be inaccurate. Earlier records, including Richter's own curriculum vitae of 1966, make no mention of such a connection.

== Childhood ==
Harold Gene Richter was born on March 5, 1925 in Fontanet, Indiana. His parents were Leslie Earl Richter and Ola Rozella (Chandler) Richter.

== Education ==
After serving in World War II, Richter attended Franklin College in Franklin, Indiana. He earned his B.A. in 1947.

During 1947–1948, Richter worked as a Junior physicist with Nathan Sugarman at Argonne National Laboratory, resulting in the publication of works on the natural radioactivity of rhenium and short‐lived fission products of iodine, rubidium and cesium.

From 1948 to 1952, Richter attended Massachusetts Institute of Technology (MIT), completing his M.Sc. in 1950 and his Ph.D. in 1952, in the chemistry department. Harold Richter studied with Charles D. Coryell at MIT, investigating nuclear chemistry. He wrote his Ph.D. thesis on The Photofusion of Uranium (1952). He published a scientific paper with Coryell on "Low-Energy Photofission Yields for U238" (1954).

== Career ==
In 1952 Richter joined the faculty of the University of Oregon in Eugene, Oregon, as an assistant professor of chemistry.

In 1954–1955, Richter did classified work at the U. S. Naval Radiological Defense Laboratory, at the Hunter's Point Naval Shipyard in San Francisco, California. From 1955 to 1959, Richter worked for the Nuclear Science and Engineering Corporation in Pittsburgh, Pennsylvania (later the International Chemical and Nuclear Corporation). At Nuclear Science and Engineering Corporation, he "developed new methods of radiochemical analysis and of low-level radioactivity techniques."

In 1959 Richter moved to the Isotope Development Laboratory of the Research Triangle Institute (RTI) in Durham, North Carolina, which was founded in 1958. Some of his work at RTI was carried out under contract to the Division of Isotopes Development of the United States Atomic Energy Commission.

In 1964–1965, Richter received a Fulbright Award to conduct further scientific investigations at laboratories outside of the United States. He was then in residence with the Section d'Application des Radioelements of the Centre d'Études Nucléaires in Grenoble, France. There he conducted radioisotope research and developed radio-release methods for tracing contaminants in stream flows.

Richter also served as a project officer for the Environmental Protection Agency of the United States. In the 1970s and 1980s, a major focus of his investigations was the development of techniques for analysis of water and air quality and subsequent use of the methods for investigation of water and air quality.

== Promethium ==
Early in the 20th century, Czech chemist Bohuslav Brauner, and later English physicist Henry Mosely, predicted the existence of an element with atomic weight 61, situated between neodymium and samarium on the periodic table. Various scientists had attempted to isolate the predicted element without success since the time of Mosely's and Brauner's predictions.

Working in 1945, Charles D. Coryell, Lawrence E. Glendenin and Jacob A. Marinsky carried out experiments on isolation of the missing element. These experiments were conducted at Clinton Laboratories in Oak Ridge, Tennessee (officially renamed Oak Ridge National Laboratory in 1947). They obtained element 61 by two means, including as a nuclear fission product of uranium and the neutron bombardment of neodymium, all conducted in graphite reactors. This element was subsequently named "promethium", an inherently unstable element in all of its isotopic forms.

Richter is not mentioned in contemporary sources that discuss the 1945 work on promethium conducted by Coryell, Marinsky, and Glendenin at Clinton Laboratories. According to Richter's 1966 curriculum vitae (published in a government report), his connection to MIT dated to 1948, after the discovery was made. Richter's cv does not mention Oak Ridge National Laboratory, Coryell, or promethium. His description of his Ph.D. work reads:

"1948-1952. Massachusetts Institute of Technology, Cambridge,. Massachusetts. The Ph.D. degree required a detailed knowledge of radiochemical analytical techniques. At the same time, it afforded an opportunity to work with the high-energy accelerators then available at MIT (linear accelerator, synchrotron and cycloytron)." Harold Richter, 1966

Richter is listed as a co-discoverer of promethium in some post-2000 internet and print sources on the history of the elements and the discovery of promethium. At least one of these sources has been criticized by reviewers for inaccuracies. Encyclopædia Britannica notes that the existence of promethium was proved by Marinsky, Glendenin, and Coryell in 1945, but not publicly announced until 1947. A photograph of Richter with Coryell, Glendenin and Marinsky, available on the internet, is undated and may reflect the period when Richter was a graduate student (1948-1952) rather than the 1945 discovery.

== Death ==
Harold G. Richter lived in Chapel Hill, North Carolina, with his wife Marjorie Richter. He died on July 19, 2001 and is buried at Chapel Hill Memorial Cemetery.

== Selected works ==
- Richter, Harold G. (1950). The behavior of iron(III) in two-phase halogen acid-ether systems (Dissertation, M.S.). Cambridge, MA: Massachusetts Institute of Technology, Dept. of Chemistry.
- Richter, Harold G. (1952). The photofusion of uranium (Dissertation, Ph.D.). Cambridge, MA: Massachusetts Institute of Technology, Dept. of Chemistry.
- Richter, Harold G; Coryell, Charles D (1954). "Low-Energy Photofission Yields for U238". Physical Review. 95 (6): 1550–1553. Bibcode:1954PhRv...95.1550R. doi:10.1103/PhysRev.95.1550.
- Debs, R. J.; Eisinger, J. T.; Fairhall, A. W.; Halpern, I.; Richter, H. G. (1 March 1955). "Yields of Photonuclear Reactions with 320-Mev X-Rays. I. Experimental Results". Physical Review. 97 (5): 1325–1327. Bibcode:1955PhRv...97.1325D. doi:10.1103/PhysRev.97.1325.
- Halpern, I.; Debs, R. J.; Eisinger, J. T.; Fairhall, A. W.; Richter, H. G. (1 March 1955). "Yields of Photonuclear Reactions with 320-Mev X-Rays. II. Interpretation of Results". Physical Review. 97 (5): 1327–1336. Bibcode:1955PhRv...97.1327H. doi:10.1103/PhysRev.97.1327.
- Richter, Harold G.; Gillespie, Jr., Arthur S. (1961). Investigation of a radioactivity technique for the determination of dissolved oxygen. Washington, D.C.: Office of Technical Services, Dept. of Commerce.
- Richter, Harold G.; Gillespie, Jr., Arthur S. (July 31, 1961). Flexible geiger counters. ORO (Series); 482. Durham, N.C.: Research Triangle Institute.
- Richter, Harold G.; Gillespie, Jr., Arthur S. (December 6, 1961). "Flexible geiger counter". U.S. Patent Office.
- Richter, H. G.; Gillespie, A. S. (August 1962). "Thallium-204 Radiometric Determination of Dissolved Oxygen in Water". Analytical Chemistry. 34 (9): 1116–1119. doi:10.1021/ac60189a026.
- Richter, Harold G.; Gillespie, Jr., Arthur S. (1964). A radio-release technique for the measurement of moisture in gases : final report. ORO (Series); 591. Durham, N.C.: Research Triangle Institute.
- Richter, Harold G.; Gillespie, Jr., Arthur S. (1964). A radio-release technique for tracing stream flows : final report. Tid; 21881. Durham, N.C.: Research Triangle Institute.
- Gillespie, A. S.; Richter, H. G. (December 1964). "Radio Release Determination of Vanadium in Water". Analytical Chemistry. 36 (13): 2473–2474. doi:10.1021/ac60219a029.
- Richter, H. G.; Gillespie, A. S. (August 1965). "Radio Release Determination of Dichromate Ion in Natural Waters". Analytical Chemistry. 37 (9): 1146–1148. doi:10.1021/ac60228a019.
- Richter, H. G. A Radiometric Method for Determination of Iodide in Natural Waters. Grenoble, France: Commissariat A l 'Energie Atomique, Centre d 'Etudes Nucleaires de Grenoble, Department des Radioelements. pp. 1–18.
- Richter, H. G. (May 1966). "A Radiometric Method for Determination of Iodide in Natural Waters". Analytical Chemistry. 38 (6): 772–774. doi:10.1021/ac60238a025.
- Richter, Harold G. (1975). Monitoring vinyl chloride around polyvinyl chloride fabrication plants. Washington, DC: Environmental Protection Agency.
- Richter, Harold G. (1983). Analysis of organic compound data gathered during 1980 in Northeast corridor cities. Washington, DC: Environmental Protection Agency.
- McElroy, Frank F.; Thompson, Vinson L.; Richter, Harold G. (1986). A cryogenic preconcentration: direct FID (PDFID) method for measurement of NMOC in ambient air. Washington, DC: Environmental Protection Agency.
- Richter, Harold G. (1988). 1987 Nonmethane Organic Compound and Air Toxics Monitoring Program Final Report. Washington, DC: Environmental Protection Agency.
- Richter, Harold G. (1988). 1988 Nonmethane Organic Compound Monitoring Program Final Report. Washington, DC: Environmental Protection Agency.
- Dodge, Marcia C.; Richter, Harold G. (1991). "Chapter 3. Properties and principles of formation of carbon monoxide". U.S. EPA. Air Quality Criteria for Carbon Monoxide (Final Report, 1991) EPA/600/8-90/045F. Washington, DC: U.S. Environmental Protection Agency.
