= Promethium compounds =

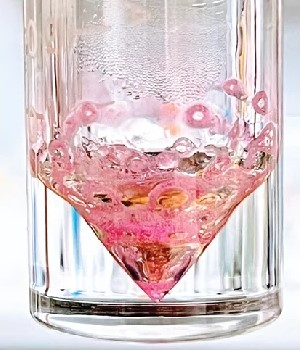
Promethium(III) nitrate, a promethium compound

Promethium compounds are compounds containing the element promethium, which normally take the +3 oxidation state. Promethium belongs to the cerium group of lanthanides and is chemically very similar to the neighboring elements. Because of its instability, chemical studies of promethium are incomplete. Even though a few compounds have been synthesized, they are not fully studied; in general, they tend to be pink or red in color. Treatment of acidic solutions containing Pm^{3+} ions with ammonia results in a gelatinous light-brown sediment of hydroxide, Pm(OH)_{3}, which is insoluble in water. When dissolved in hydrochloric acid, a water-soluble yellow salt, PmCl_{3}, is produced; similarly, when dissolved in nitric acid, a nitrate results, Pm(NO_{3})_{3}. The latter is also well-soluble; when dried, it forms pink crystals, similar to Nd(NO_{3})_{3}. The electron configuration for Pm^{3+} is [Xe] 4f^{4}, and the color of the ion is pink. The ground state term symbol is ^{5}I_{4}. The sulfate is slightly soluble, like the other cerium group sulfates. Cell parameters have been calculated for its octahydrate; they led to the conclusion that the density of Pm_{2}(SO_{4})_{3}·8 H_{2}O is 2.86 g/cm^{3}. The oxalate, Pm_{2}(C_{2}O_{4})_{3}·10 H_{2}O, has the lowest solubility of all lanthanide oxalates.

Unlike the nitrate, the oxide is similar to the corresponding samarium salt and not the neodymium salt. As-synthesized, e.g. by heating the oxalate, it is a white or lavender-colored powder with disordered structure. This powder crystallizes in a cubic lattice upon heating to 600 °C. Further annealing at 800 °C and then at 1750 °C irreversibly transforms it to monoclinic and hexagonal phases, respectively, and the last two phases can be interconverted by adjusting the annealing time and temperature.

Formula	symmetry	space group	No	Pearson symbol	a (pm)	b (pm)	c (pm)	Z	density, g/cm^{3}
α-Pm	dhcp	P6_{3}/mmc	194	hP4	365	365	1165	4	7.26
β-Pm	bcc	Fm3̅m	225	cF4	410	410	410	4	6.99
Pm_{2}O_{3}	cubic	Ia3̅	206	cI80	1099	1099	1099	16	6.77
Pm_{2}O_{3}	monoclinic	C2/m	12	mS30	1422	365	891	6	7.40
Pm_{2}O_{3}	hexagonal	P3̅m1	164	hP5	380.2	380.2	595.4	1	7.53

Promethium forms only one stable oxidation state, +3, in the form of ions; this is in line with other lanthanides. According to its position in the periodic table, the element cannot be expected to form stable +4 or +2 oxidation states; treating chemical compounds containing Pm^{3+} ions with strong oxidizing or reducing agents showed that the ion is not easily oxidized or reduced.

Promethium halides
Formula	color	coordination number	symmetry	space group	No	Pearson symbol	m.p. (°C)
PmF_{3}	Purple-pink	11	hexagonal	P3̅c1	165	hP24	1338
PmCl_{3}	Lavender	9	hexagonal	P6_{3}/mc	176	hP8	655
PmBr_{3}	Red	8	orthorhombic	Cmcm	63	oS16	624
α-PmI_{3}	Red	8	orthorhombic	Cmcm	63	oS16	α→β
β-PmI_{3}	Red	6	rhombohedral	R3̅	148	hR24	695

== Bibliography ==
- Lavruk︠h︡ina, Avgusta Konstantinovna; Pozdni︠a︡kov, Aleksandr Aleksandrovich (1970). Analytical chemistry of technetium, promethium, astatine and francium. S2CID 94160197.
