= Promethium nitride =

Names
- Other names Promethium mononitride

Identifiers
CAS Number	12033-52-2
3D model (JSmol)	Interactive image
- InChI: InChI=1S/N.Pm/q-3;+3 Key: YULBPTJJWQHEHB-UHFFFAOYSA-N
- SMILES: [Pm+3].[N-3]

Properties
Chemical formula	NPm
Molar mass	159 g·mol^{−1}
Density	7.89 g/cm^{3}
- Except where otherwise noted, data are given for materials in their standard state (at 25 °C [77 °F], 100 kPa). Infobox references

Promethium nitride is a binary inorganic compound of promethium and nitrogen with the chemical formula PmN.

== Physical properties ==
PmN crystals are of cubic system with Fm3m space group.
