= Arthur M. Poskanzer =

American physicist (1931–2021)

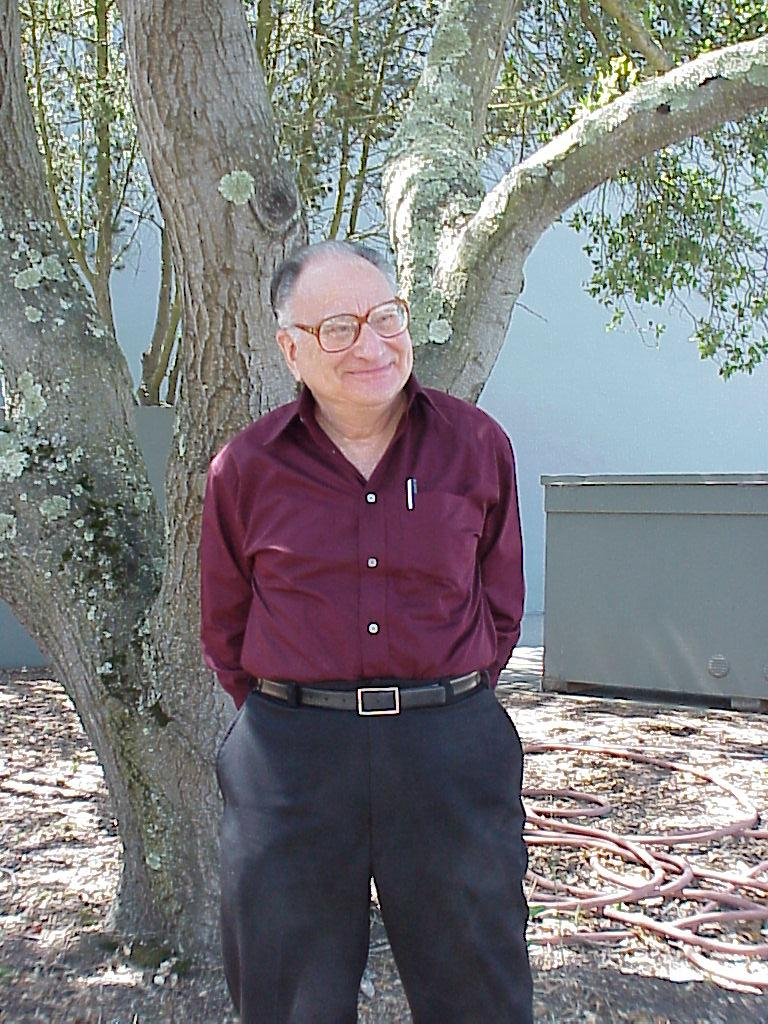

Arthur M. Poskanzer (28 June 1931 in New York City – 30 June 2021 in Berkeley, California) was an experimental physicist, known for his pioneering work on relativistic nuclear collisions.

Poskanzer received in 1953 his bachelor's degree in physics and chemistry from Harvard University and in 1954 his master's degree in chemistry from Columbia University. In 1957 he received his Ph.D. from Massachusetts Institute of Technology in physical chemistry. At Harvard his undergraduate advisor was George Kistiakowsky, and at MIT his doctoral advisor was Charles Coryell.

From 1957 to 1966 Poskanzer was a chemist at Brookhaven National Laboratory. From 1966 he worked as a scientist at Lawrence Berkeley National Laboratory (LBL) and remained on the staff there until 2001, when he retired with emeritus status. From 1978 to 1979 he was the scientific director of Bevalac. From 1980 to 1990 he was the leader of the Plastic Ball Experimental Group, which was part of a collaboration between LBL and GSI Helmholtz Centre for Heavy Ion Research (GSI). From 1990 to 1995 he was the head of the Relativistic Collisions Program at LBL.

He is famous as one of the co-discoverers of what nuclear physicists call collective flow; this phenomenon consists of fluidic motion exhibited by nuclear matter, such as quarks and gluons, when compressed to a physical state of high temperature and high energy-density. This discovery was made during the collaboration between LBL and GSI.

Among the many highlights of Poskanzer's career at Berkeley Lab, in addition to his co-discovery of collective flow of nuclear matter, he was the first scientific director of the Bevalac accelerator, the co-founder of the STAR collaboration at the Relativistic Heavy Ion Collider (RHIC), and one of the leading organizers behind SPS heavy ion program at CERN. He was also a co-discoverer of elliptic flow at RHIC, which has proved to be major experimental evidence for the existence of the quark-gluon plasma, an ephemeral state of matter believed to have existed in the first few microseconds after the universe was born. The elliptic flow paper he co-authored was the first from the STAR collaboration and is now a "famous paper" with over 300 citations.

For the academic year 1970/71 he was a Guggenheim Fellow at the University of Paris-Sud in Orsay. He was several times a visiting scientist at CERN (in 1979/80, in 1986/87 and in 1995/96, with the latter two visiting years each supported by Alexander von Humboldt Senior US Scientist Awards).

He married in 1954 and upon his death in 2021 was survived by his widow, their three children, and four grandchildren.

== Honors and awards ==
- 1976 — elected a Fellow of the American Physical Society
- 1979 — American Chemical Society Award in Nuclear Chemistry
- 1992 — elected a Fellow of the American Association for the Advancement of Science
- 2008 — Tom W. Bonner Prize in Nuclear Physics
