= Olavi Erämetsä =

Finnish chemist and professor

Kurt Heikki Olavi Erämetsä
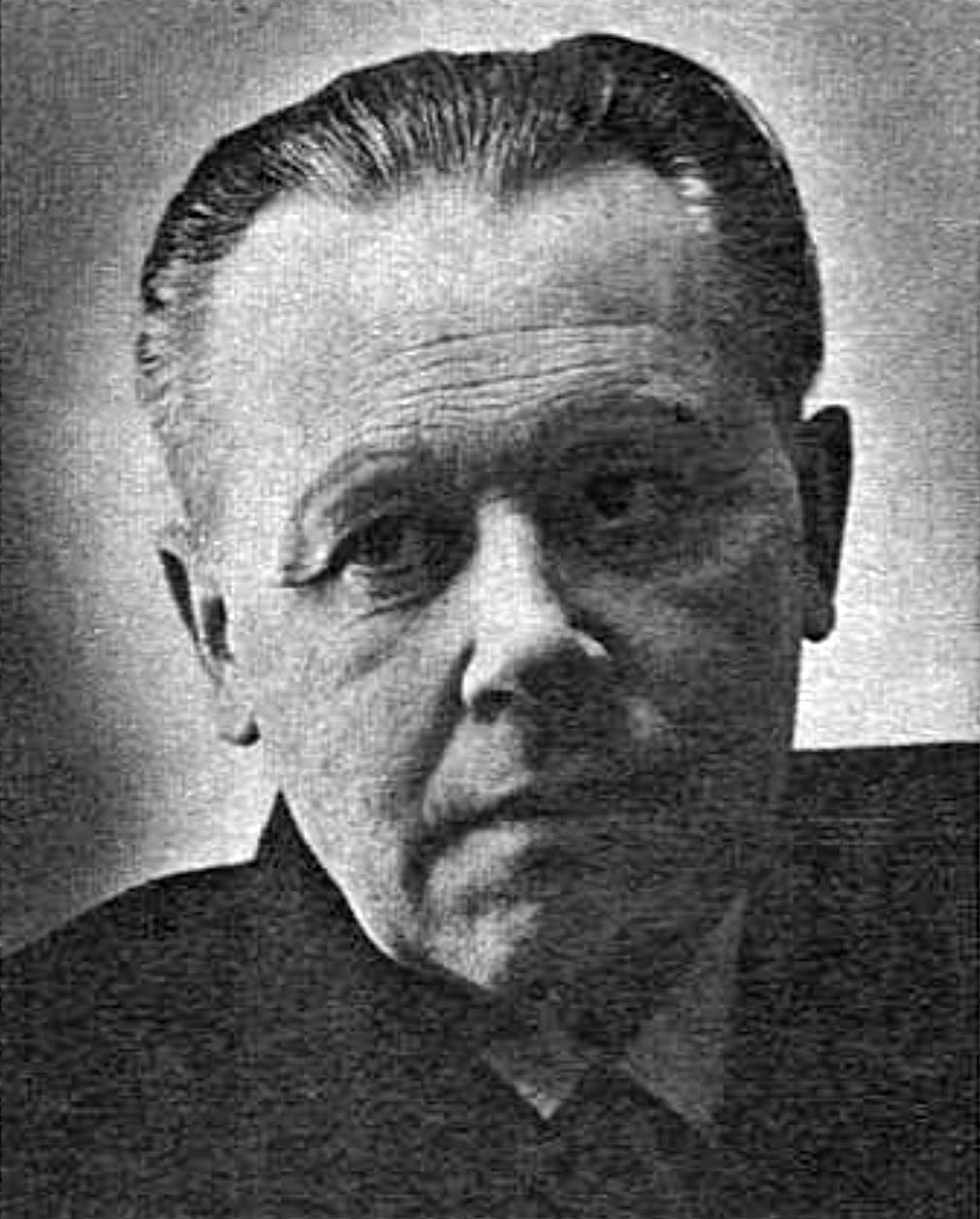
- Born: Kurt Heikki Olavi Enwald; 10 October 1906; Lahti, Finland
- Died: 3 January 1974 (aged 67); Helsinki, Finland
- Education: Helsinki University of Technology
- Known for: Promethium
- Spouse: Elvi Kaarina Pakarinen (1904-1978)
- Scientific career
- Fields: Geochemistry, Environmental chemistry
- Workplaces: Helsinki University of Technology

Olavi Erämetsä (born Enwald; 10 October 1906 Lahti, Finland - 3 January 1974 Helsinki, Finland) was a Finnish chemist at the Helsinki University of Technology (TKK, now part of Aalto University). He served as a lecturer in analytical chemistry (1940-1946) before succeeding Yrjö Kauko as professor of inorganic chemistry (1947-1973).

Erämetsä was a major initiator of geochemical research in rare earths and trace elements at TKK from 1947 to 1973. In 1965, he reported the isolation of the element promethium from natural sources.

Erämetsä studied the presence of trace elements including rare earths in soils and plants such as lichens and mosses. He also studied their presence in the human body, gathering epidemiological evidence about environmental factors and their possible effects on human health.

Erämetsä was the Chairman of the Finnish Chemistry Society in 1945–1946, a Founding Member of the Finnish Academy of Engineering in 1957 and a Member of the Finnish Academy of Sciences as of 1961.

== Early life ==
Kurt Heikki Olavi Erämetsä was born to Kurt H. Enwald and Ingrid Viola Ryberg on October 10, 1906. The Enwald family changed its name to Erämetsä in 1936. Kurt H. Enwald and Ingrid Viola Ryberg were teachers of science at the Kuopio Lyseo.

== Education ==
Erämetsä attended Kuopio Lyseo as an undergraduate in 1925. He continued to study chemistry at the Helsinki University of Technology, where he graduated with a M.Sc. in engineering in 1934 and a Ph.D. in technology in 1938. His Ph.D. work dealt with detection of the presence of indium in Finnish minerals.

== Career ==
Erämetsä was an assistant geologist for the Geological Commission and made five exploration trips to Lapland. He carried out a number of diamond surveys in the Paatsjoki area of Petsamo in the 1930s, trying to verify reports of diamonds in the sands in that area. He concluded that what had been discovered was likely to have been spinel octahedra.

In 1939 Erämetsä and Thure Georg Sahama developed a new method for the separation of rare earths using chromatography. Their chromatographic separation method became a standard for the separation of rare earth and radioactive actinides into ion exchange resins.

Erämetsä worked as a lecturer in analytical chemistry at the Helsinki University of Technology (TKK) from 1940 to 1946 and then as a professor of inorganic chemistry from 1947 to 1973. During his time there, the department received new hardware including a spectrograph, Finland's first equipment for spark source mass spectrometry, and X-ray fluorescence equipment.

Large-scale industrial production of rare earths occurred in the 1960s at the Typpi Oy mills in Oulu, where lanthanide ores of the Kola Peninsula were being refined. Erämetsä's most well-known, though controversial achievement, was the isolation of the element promethium from these natural sources. In 1965, he published a report stating that in 1964 he had successfully isolated isotopes of promethium from natural ores. Erämetsä separated out traces of ^{147}Pm from a rare earth concentrate purified from apatite, resulting in an upper limit of 10^{−21} for the abundance of promethium in nature; this may have been produced by the natural nuclear fission of uranium, or by cosmic ray spallation of ^{146}Nd. The international scientific community was initially suspicious of the findings, as promethium had previously only been produced as a degradation product from the fission of uranium ore. Due to promethium's short half-life, its concentration in natural minerals was thought to be too small to be isolated. Subsequent findings were in line with those of Erämetsä.

Erämetsä and Allan Johansson used praseodymium to experiment with the development of a solid electrolyte fuel cell.

Erämetsä studied the presence of trace elements including rare earths in soils and plants such as lichens and mosses. He also studied of the presence of rare earths in the human body, over a period of many years. Results were negative from 1945 to 1969, when x-ray emission spectroscopy was introduced. With the new instruments, the researchers detected yttrium and other lanthanides. In one study, autopsies were performed on the bodies of people who had died in Helsinki hospitals. Yttrium was found in varying amounts and locations in the bodies of almost half of those examined (37/80). Erämetsä was concerned with epidemiologic evidence of environmental factors affecting human health, cf. the presence of metals in drinking water and their possible relationships to coronary heart disease.
