= Hippolyte-Victor Collet-Descotils =

French chemist

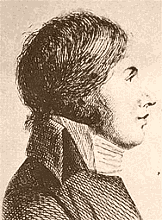
- Hippolyte-Victor Collet-Descotils
- Born: 21 November 1773; Caen, France
- Died: 6 December 1815 (aged 42); Paris, France
- Education: École des Mines de Paris

Hippolyte-Victor Collet-Descotils (French: [ipɔlit viktɔʁ kɔlɛ dɛkɔtil]; 21 November 1773 in Caen – 6 December 1815 in Paris) was a French chemist. He studied in the École des Mines de Paris, and was a student and friend of Louis Nicolas Vauquelin.

He is best known for confirming the discovery of chromium by Vauquelin, and for independently discovering iridium in 1803.

In 1806, Collet-Descotils misidentified erythronium, a new element discovered in Mexico by Andrés Manuel del Río, thinking that it was chromium. This resulted in Alexander von Humboldt rejecting Del Río's discovery. The same element was rediscovered thirty years later in Sweden and renamed as vanadium.

In 1815, a few months before his death, he got the position of director of École des Mines de Paris, in charge of transferring the school to a new building. He is buried in the 10th Division of the Père Lachaise Cemetery of Paris.
