= Andrés Manuel del Río =

Mexican scientist (1764–1849)

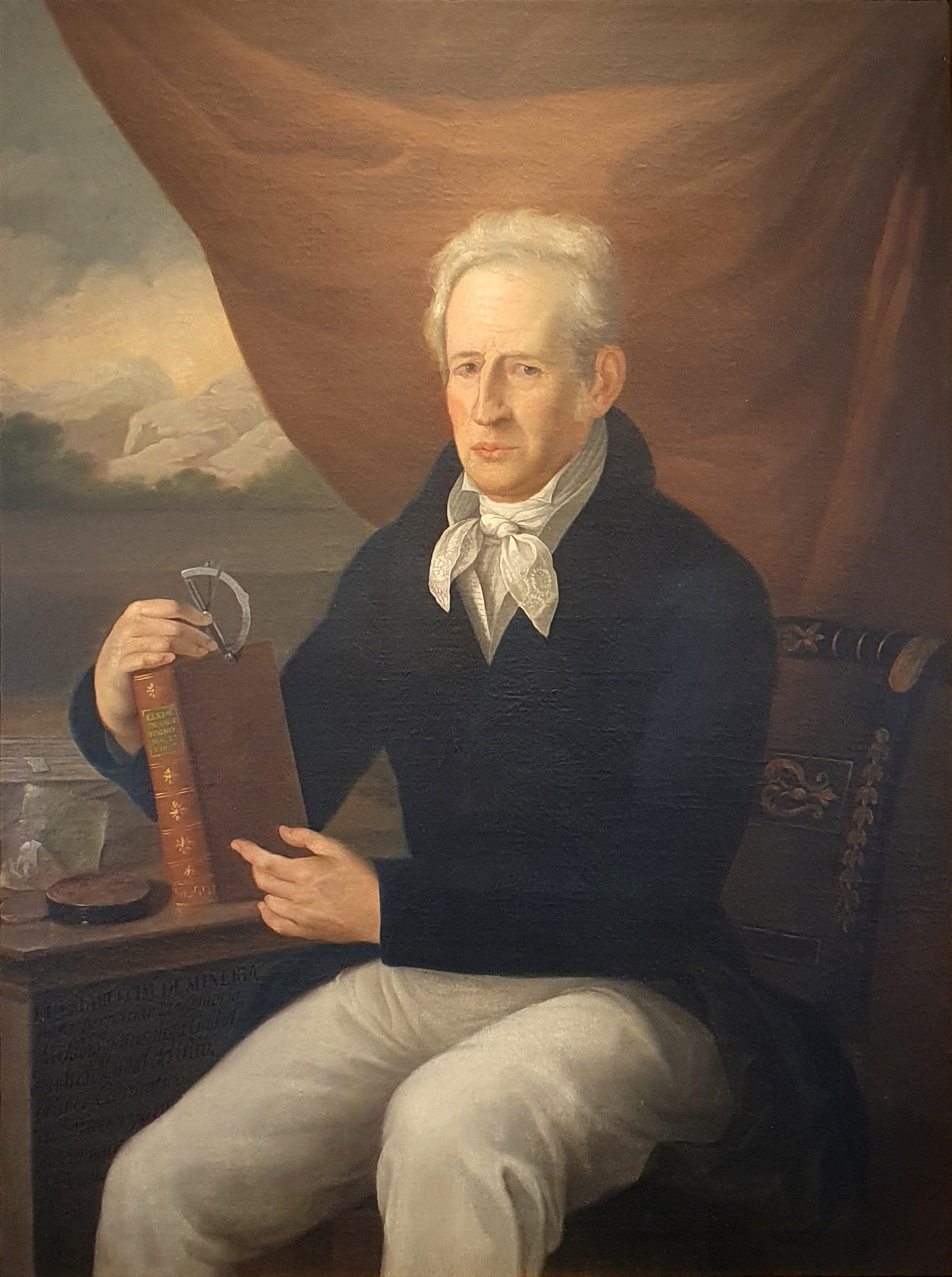
- Andrés Manuel del Río (1825)
- Born: 10 November 1764; Madrid, Spain
- Died: 23 March 1849 (aged 84); Mexico City, Mexico
- Education: University of Alcalá de Henares
- Known for: discovery of vanadium
- Scientific career
- Fields: natural history chemistry

Andrés Manuel del Río y Fernández (10 November 1764 – 23 March 1849) was a Spanish scientist, naturalist and engineer who discovered compounds of vanadium in 1801. He proposed that the element be given the name panchromium, or later, erythronium, but his discovery was not credited at the time, and his names were not used.

== Education ==
Andrés del Río studied analytical chemistry and metallurgy in Spain, where he was born. He received his bachelor's degree from the University of Alcalá de Henares in 1780 at the age of fifteen. The government gave him a scholarship to enter the Royal Academy of Mines in Almadén, Spain, as of June 1782. He showed great aptitude. In 1783 he was given a travel grant by the Spanish Ministry of Mines. He used it to study in Paris, with the chemist Jean Darcet at the Collège de France.

Del Río continued his studies at the Mining Academy in Freiberg, Germany, under the direction of Abraham Gottlob Werner in 1789. In Freiberg he got to know Baron Alexander von Humboldt. Del Río went on to study at the Austrian Imperial-Royal Mining Academy at Schemnitz, Hungary, with Anton von Rupprecht, as well as in England.

Del Rio returned to Paris in 1791 where he was a colleague (asociado) of Antoine Lavoisier, who is considered the founder of modern chemistry, and Abbé René Just Haüy, who is considered the founder of crystallography. As a result of the French Revolution, a warrant for Lavoisier's arrest was issued on 4 November 1793. Lavoisier was executed on the guillotine on 8 May 1794. After Lavoisier's arrest, Del Río escaped to England.

== Mining in New Spain ==
In 1792, the Real Seminario de Minería (College of Mines) was founded in New Spain by a decree of King Charles III of Spain, with the object of reforming the study of mining and metallurgy in the colony. The institution was initially headed by Fausto Elhúyar (1755–1833), the discoverer of tungsten. In 1793, Elhúyar offered Del Río a position as chair at the newly organized college. Del Rio refused the chair of chemistry, but accepted that of mineralogy. Del Río arrived at the port of Veracruz on 20 October 1794, on the ship San Francisco de Alcántara out of Cádiz.

Once in his new position, del Río dedicated himself to teaching and scientific investigation. On 27 April 1795 he opened the first course in mineralogy ever presented in New Spain. He made important studies of minerals and developed innovative methods in mining. He also wrote the first textbook of mineralogy to be published anywhere in America, Elementos de Orictognosía, and the first in Spanish rather than German or English. Volume I appeared in 1795, and volume II in 1805. Santiago Ramírez, his student and later his biographer, described it as "a monumental work, which... will be an object of veneration and consultation".

German naturalist, Alexander von Humboldt, making a survey of resources in Spanish-held colonies for Spain, reported favorably that it was in Mexico where the best work of mineralogy in Spanish had been published, the Elementos de Orictognosia of Señor Del Rio. Humboldt spent the period from March 1803 to March 1804 in Mexico City, renewing his friendship with del Rio and actively participating in the investigations of the College of Mining. He organized excursions to Chapultepec, to the basaltic zone of Pedregal de San Ángel, the lava fields of the Xitle volcano, and to the hot springs of Peñón de los Baños, a rocky outcrop close to the modern Mexico City International Airport, accumulating data and samples of minerals and rocks that were then submitted to chemical tests for identification.

In 1820 del Río was named a deputy to the Spanish Cortes. He was a liberal who argued for the independence of New Spain. He was in Madrid when Mexico gained its independence. Invited to remain in Spain, he nevertheless returned to Mexico (in 1821), which he considered his homeland.

"Although it is true that he was born Spanish, given the quality of his character, his sympathies, the services rendered to Mexico, and his outstanding intelligence, he was, is, and always will be Mexican."– Credited to del Rio's students

In 1829, amidst the Spanish attempts to reconquer Mexico, the government of independent Mexico expelled the Spaniards resident in the country, with some notable exceptions. Del Río was one of the exceptions. The expulsion had a major impact on the work of the College of Mining. The director, Fausto Elhúyar, was forced to resign and leave the country.

Indignant over the expulsion of his colleagues, del Río showed solidarity by himself entering voluntary exile in Philadelphia for four years. There he was highly honored. He took part in the scientific activities of the American Philosophical Society (elected 1830) and was elected president of the Geological Society of Philadelphia. John Hurtel of Philadelphia published a new edition of del Rio's book in 1832. Del Rio returned to Mexico in 1834 and again occupied the chair of mineralogy at the college. He was also given the chair of geology.

== The discovery of vanadium ==
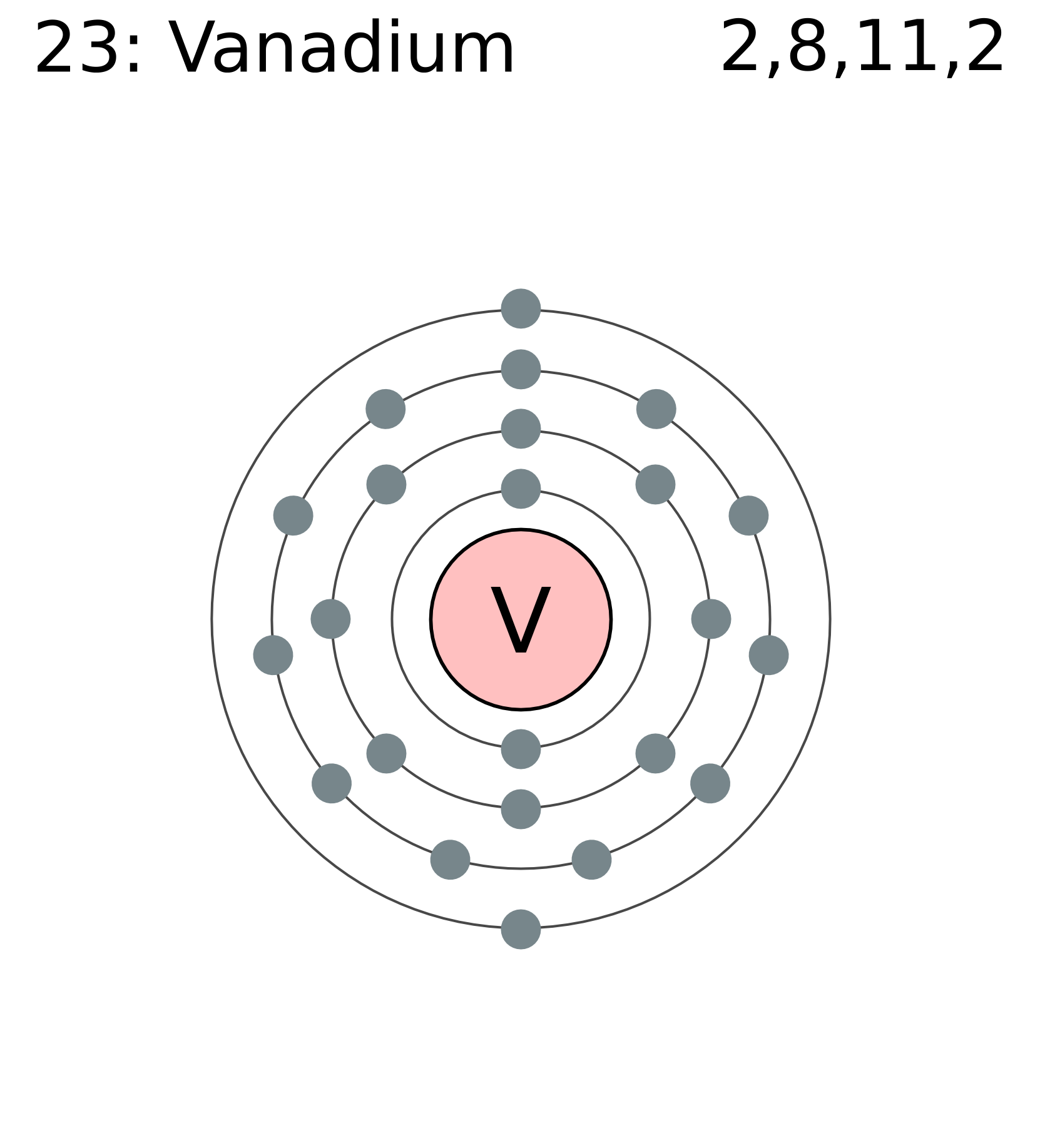
Element 23 on the periodic table.

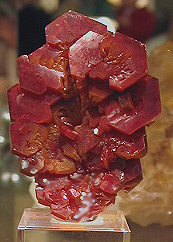
Vanadium is not found in the native state, but is present in minerals such as vanadinite, Pb_{5}(VO_{4})_{3}Cl.

In 1801, while examining mineral samples sent to him by the Purísima del Cardenal mine in Zimapán in the State of Hidalgo, del Río arrived at the conclusion that he had found a new metallic element. He prepared various compounds of the element, and observing their diverse colors, he named the element panchromium (Greek: παγχρώμιο "all colors"). Later, on observing that the compounds changed color to red on heating, he substituted the name erythronium (Greek: ερυθρός "red").

The following year he gave samples containing the new element to Alexander von Humboldt, who sent them on to Hippolyte Victor Collet-Descotils in París for his analysis. Collet-Descotils's analysis found (mistakenly) that the samples contained only chromium. Humboldt, in turn, rejected del Río's claim of the discovery of a new element, and del Río himself concluded his discovery had been an error.

In 1830, 27 years after its initial discovery, Professor Nils Gabriel Sefström of Sweden rediscovered the element in a sample of iron of Taberg. He gave it its current name, vanadium, in honor of the Scandinavian goddess of love and beauty, Vanadis. In the same year, Friedrich Wöhler, the German chemist who had synthesized urea, analyzed some of del Río's samples of brown lead ore of Zimapán and demonstrated that Sefström's vanadium and del Rio's erythronium were the same.

In 1831 the U.S. geologist George William Featherstonhaugh proposed without success that the element should be named rionium, in honor of its original discoverer. An extensive analysis of the publication history of papers relating to the discovery of the element suggests that the intervention of J. J. Berzelius on behalf of his students Sefström and Wöhler, was highly instrumental in influencing the element's attribution and naming, reflecting patterns of scientific prestige and control of discourse in the first half of the nineteenth century.

In 1867 the English chemist Henry Enfield Roscoe isolated the pure metal for the first time. He used hydrogen to get rid of the chloride around the pure vanadium.

== Later life ==
In 1805 del Río established an ironworks at Coalcomán. After overcoming numerous obstacles, he produced the first iron in Mexico, on 29 April 1807. Four years later, during the Mexican War of Independence, the royalists destroyed the ironworks. The iron he produced was superior to the celebrated imported iron from Biscay (Vizcaya), Spain.

Del Rio was bitter about Humboldt's mistake in not confirming the discovery of vanadium, and strongly reproached him. He continued to teach at the College of Mines until his death, a course that "could well have been taught at the Polytechnic school in Paris", according to Michel Chevalier, who visited del Río shortly before the latter's death.

== Death and recognition ==
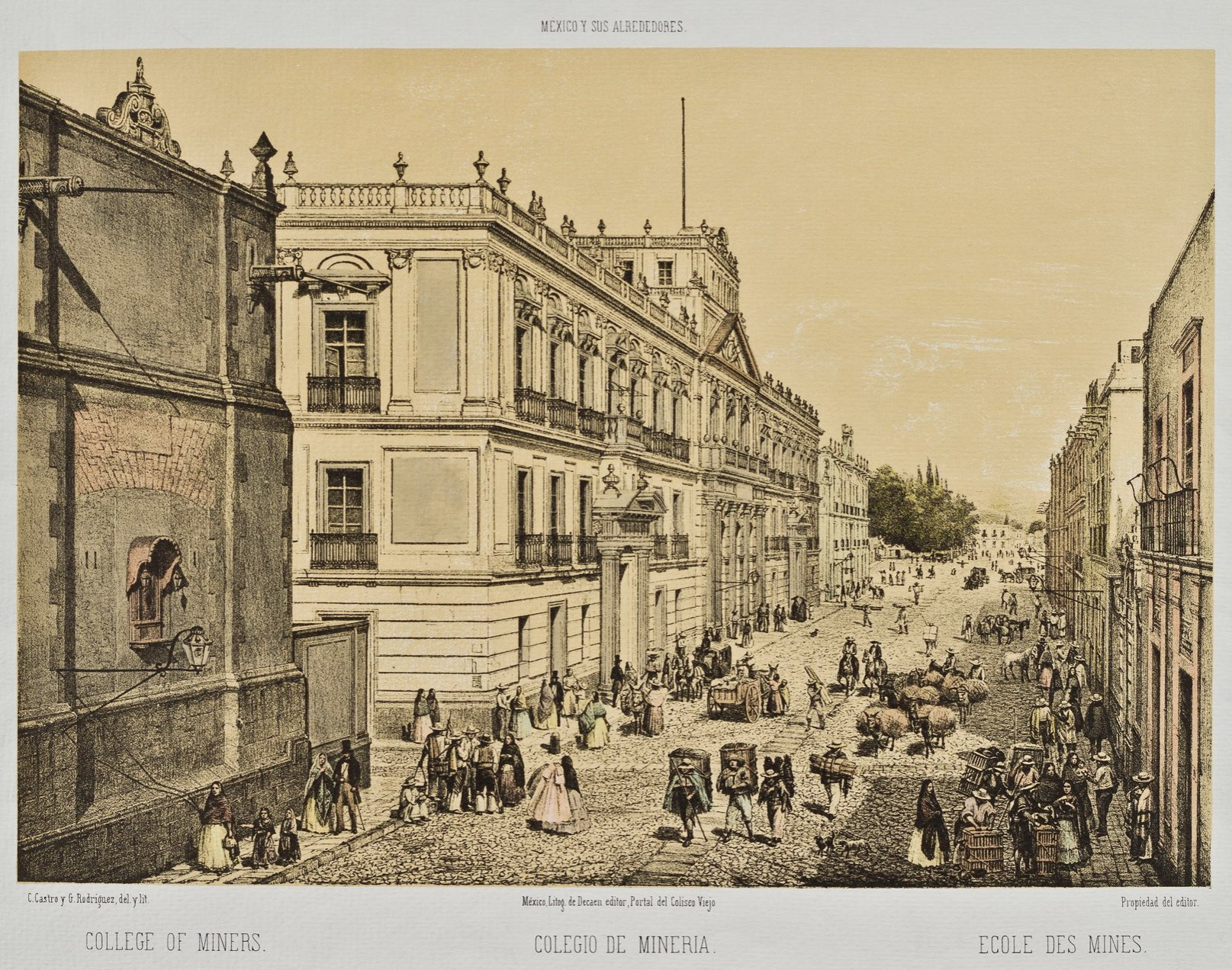
Palacio de Mineria, Mexico City

Andrés Manuel del Río died at 84 in 1849, after a long and productive academic career. His work and his liberal politics were important to the building of an independent Mexican nation. He was the founding professor of mineralogy at the College of Mines, which laid the base for the current Institute of Geology of the National Autonomous University of Mexico (UNAM).

He was a member of the Spanish Royal Academy of Sciences in Madrid, the Wernerian Natural History Society of Edinburgh, the Royal Academy of Sciences of France, the Economic Society of Leipzig, the Linnean Society of Leipzig, the Royal Academy of Saxony and the Philosophical Society of Philadelphia. He was also president of the Geological Society of Philadelphia and the Lyceum of Natural History of New York.

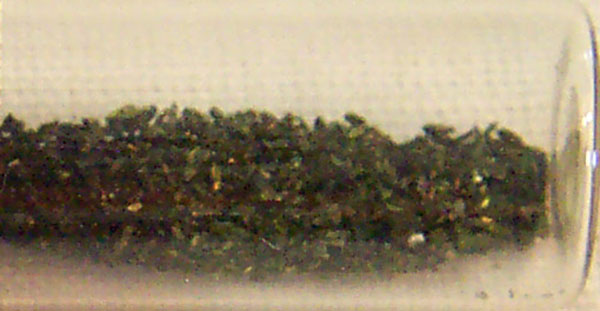
A sample of vanadium.

His extensive scientific work, besides the first identification of vanadium, included the discovery and description of various minerals and the invention of methods of extraction of minerals for use in the mining industry. After his death, the important mining district that includes Batopilas in Chihuahua was named in his honor.

The Chemical Society of Mexico instituted the prestigious National Chemistry Prize "Andrés Manuel Del Río" in 1964, with the object of giving public recognition to the work done by chemical professionals who have made extraordinary contributions to raise the level and prestige of the profession. It is awarded with a medal containing the likeness of del Río and a commemorative plaque. Andrés Manuel Del Río, Luis E. Miramontes, inventor of the first oral contraceptive, and Mario J. Molina, winner of the Nobel Prize in Chemistry in 1995, are the three Mexican chemists of outstanding world significance. Miramontes won the "Andrés Manuel Del Río" Prize in 1986.

== Selected scientific works ==
- Elementos de Orictognesia o del conocimiento de los fósiles, prepared for use in the Real Seminario de Mineria de México, 1795.
- Analyse des deux nouvelles espéces minérales composées de séléniure de zinc et de sulfure de mercure. Annales des Mines, Paris, 5, 1829.
- Découverte de l'iodure de mercure au Mexique. Annales des Mines, Paris, 5, 1829.
- Elementos de Orictognesia, o del conocimiento de los fósiles según el sistema de Bercelio; y según los principios de Abraham Góttlob Wérner, con la sinonimia inglesa, alemana y francesa, para uso del Seminario Nacional de Minería de México. Philadelphia, 1832, ISBN 9780270612905.

== Bibliography ==
- (in Spanish) "Río, Andrés Manuel del," Enciclopedia de México, v. 12. Mexico City, 1987.
- (in Spanish) Alessio Robles, Vito. El ilustre maestro Andrés Manuel del Río. Mexico City, 1937. 31 p.
- (in Spanish) Arnaiz y Freg, Arturo. Andrés Manuel del Río: Estudio biográfico. Mexico City: Casino Español de México, 1936.
- (in Spanish) Arnaiz y Freg, Arturo. Don Andrés del Río, descubrimiento del Eritronio (Vanadio). Mexico City: Cultura, 1948. 44 p.
- (in Spanish) Prieto, Carlos et al. Andrés Manuel del Río y su obra científica: Segundo centenario de su natalicio, 1764–1964. México: Compañía Fundidora de Fierro y Acero de Monterrey, 1966. 81 p.
- (in Spanish) Ramírez, Santiago E. Biografía del sr. D. Andrés Manuel del Río: Primer catedrático de mineralogía del Colegio de Minería. México: Imp. del Sagrado Corazón de Jesús, 1891. 56 p.
- (in Spanish) Ramírez, Santiago. Ensayos biográficos de Joaquín Velásquez de León y Andrés Manuel del Río. México: UNAM, Facultad de Ingeniería, Sociedad de ex-alumnos, 1983.
- (in Spanish) Rojo, Onofre. La prioridad en los descubrimientos y su relación con la infraestructura científica. Avance y Perspectiva 20: 107–111 (1997). ISSN 0185-1411.

A short biography of Andrés Manuel del Río is found in "Oxford Dictionary of Scientists" by Oxford University Press, 1999.
