= P. M. de Respour =

Flemish metallurgist and alchemist

P. M. de Respour, a Flemish metallurgist and alchemist, was the first person to extract metallic zinc from zinc oxide, which he did in 1668.

== Original works ==
- De Respour, P. M.: Rare Experiences svr l'esprit mineral..' Paris, France (1498)
