= Bohuslav Brauner =

Czech chemist who studied rare earths (1855–1935)

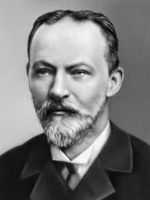
- Born: 8 May 1855; Prague
- Died: 15 February 1935 (aged 79); Prague
- Education: Charles University
- Known for: Determination of atomic weights Rare-earth elements
- Scientific career
- Fields: Inorganic chemistry
- Workplaces: Charles University

Bohuslav Brauner (8 May 1855 – 15 February 1935) was a Czech chemist. He worked at the University of Prague, where he investigated the properties of the rare earth elements, especially the determination of their atomic weights. Brauner predicted the existence of the rare earth element promethium ten years before the existence of the gap was confirmed experimentally (although the element was still undiscovered). In the 1880s, when he already had started lecturing in Prague, he still competed internationally in cycling races.

== Career ==
Brauner was a student of Robert Bunsen at the University of Heidelberg and later of Henry Roscoe at the University of Manchester. Brauner became lecturer for chemistry at the Charles University of Prague in 1883, assistant professor as of 1890, and full professor as of 1897. During the course of his career, he corresponded frequently with Dmitri Mendeleev, and they influenced each other as models for periodicity of the elements were developed.

Brauner retired from the Charles University of Prague in 1925 and died of pneumonia in 1935.

== Scientific contributions ==
During Brauner's time with Roscoe at the University of Manchester, he became interested in the chemistry of the rare earth elements. A theme of his investigations was the determination of their relative positions in the periodic table. One method he used to separate these elements was fluorination, yielding compounds that could be purified.

As part of his investigations on the chemistry of the lanthanides, Brauner proposed in 1902 the existence of an element that would be located between neodymium and samarium in the periodic table. Henry Moseley experimentally confirmed Brauner's prediction in 1914, identifying the gap between their nuclear charges. The missing element was eventually synthesized in 1945 and named promethium.

Brauner's investigations into the rare earth elements and their atomic weights depended on purity of the compounds under evaluation. This caused ambiguity at times. He proposed that the element tellurium had an atomic weight of 125 daltons, although he acknowledged that his evaluation of tellurium could be based on mixtures of metals. Later, Brauner obtained samples of the substance referred to as didymium. In 1882, he was able to use spectroscopy to observe two groups of absorption bands, one blue (A = 449–443 nm) and one yellow (A = 590–568 nm). He concluded that didymium was actually a mixture of two rare earth elements. However, it was Carl Auer von Welsbach who recognized that didymium was actually a mixture of the two rare earth elements praseodymium and neodymium, the discovery occurring in 1885. Von Welsbach's discovery was initially a source of consternation to Brauner.

Brauner authored the chapter on rare earth elements in Mendeleev's textbook "Principles of Chemistry". He also wrote the portion on atomic weights in "Handbuch der Anorganischen Chemie", which was a textbook authored principally by Richard Abegg.

== Honors ==
Brauner received honorary memberships to the Chemical Society of London, the American Chemical Society and the Societe Chimique de France, and an honorary Doctor of Science degree from the University of Manchester. The Recueil des Travaux Chimiques des Pays-Bas honored him in 1925 as did the Collection of Czechoslovak Chemical Communications in 1930.
