= Promethium(III) nitrate =

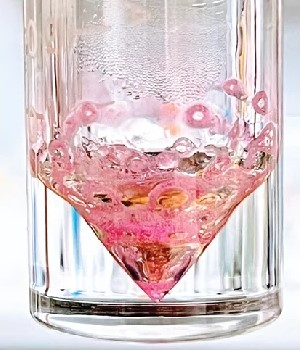
- Hydrate

Names
- Other names Promethium trinitrate, Promethium nitrate

Identifiers
CAS Number	42083-68-1
3D model (JSmol)	Interactive image
ChemSpider	129549568
CompTox Dashboard (EPA)	DTXSID701336994
- InChI: InChI=1S/3NO3.Pm/c3*2-1(3)4;/q3*-1;+3 Key: BLVQZLMLJMPOIU-UHFFFAOYSA-N
- SMILES: [N+](=O)([O-])[O-].[N+](=O)([O-])[O-].[N+](=O)([O-])[O-].[Pm+3]

Properties
Chemical formula	Pm(NO_{3})_{3}
Molar mass	206.918 g/mol
Appearance	Purple-pink solid (hydrate)
Solubility in water	Soluble

Hazards
- GHS labelling
Signal word	Warning

Related compounds
Related compounds	Samarium(III) nitrate
- Except where otherwise noted, data are given for materials in their standard state (at 25 °C [77 °F], 100 kPa). Infobox references

Promethium(III) nitrate is an inorganic compound, a salt of promethium and nitric acid with the chemical formula Pm(NO_{3})_{3}. The compound is radioactive, soluble in water and forms crystalline hydrates.

== Synthesis ==
Reaction of promethium and nitric acid:

Pm + 6 HNO_{3} → Pm(NO_{3})_{3} + 3 NO_{2} + 3 H_{2}O

== Physical properties ==
Promethium(III) nitrate hydrate forms a purple-pink solid.

It forms crystalline hydrates of the composition Pm(NO_{3})_{3}·6H_{2}O.

== Chemical properties ==
Promethium(III) nitrate thermally decomposes to form promethium(III) oxide.
