= Jacob A. Marinsky =

American chemist

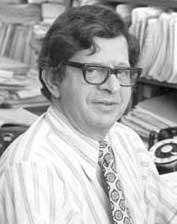
- Jacob A. Marinsky
- Born: 11 April 1918; Buffalo, New York, US
- Died: 1 September 2005 (aged 87)
- Education: University at Buffalo, MIT
- Known for: co-discovery of promethium, Manhattan Project
- Scientific career
- Fields: Chemistry
- Workplaces: Clinton Laboratories

Jacob Akiba Marinsky (April 11, 1918, Buffalo, New York – September 1, 2005) was a chemist who was the co-discoverer of the element promethium.

== Biography ==
Marinsky was born in Buffalo, New York on April 11, 1918. He attended the State University of New York at Buffalo, beginning at age 16 and receiving a bachelor's degree in chemistry in 1939.

During World War II he was employed as a chemist for the Manhattan Project, working for Clinton Laboratories (now Oak Ridge National Laboratory) from 1944 to 1946. In 1945, together with Lawrence E. Glendenin and Charles D. Coryell, he isolated the previously undocumented rare earth element 61 (promethium). Marinsky and Glendenin produced it both by extraction from fission products and by bombarding neodymium with neutrons. They isolated it using ion-exchange chromatography. Publication of the finding was delayed until later due to the war. Marinsky and Glendenin announced the discovery at a meeting of the American Chemical Society in September 1947. Upon the suggestion of Charles D. Coryell's wife Grace Coryell, the team named the new element for the mythical god Prometheus, who stole fire from the gods and was punished for the act by Zeus. They had also considered naming it "clintonium" for the facility where it was isolated.

Marinsky was among the Manhattan Project scientists who in 1945 signed a petition against using an atomic bomb on Japan.

He resumed his education after the war, obtaining a PhD in Nuclear and Inorganic Chemistry from the Massachusetts Institute of Technology in 1949. He worked in industrial research before joining the faculty of the State University of New York at Buffalo in 1957. His research was concerned with nuclear inorganic chemistry, physicochemical studies of ion exchange, and polyelectrolyte and electrolyte systems. During the early 1960s Marinsky was a Fulbright Research Scholar at the Weizmann Institute of Science in Israel. He worked again for SUNY at Buffalo during the late 1960s; when during that time the university required faculty to sign an oath of loyalty to the United States, Marinsky refused, terming it a violation of civil liberties; some other faculty members lost their jobs due to such a refusal. He retired in 1988, becoming a professor emeritus.

In 1990, he received the Clifford Furnas Memorial Award of the State University of New York at Buffalo, awarded to graduates whose scientific accomplishments brought prestige to the university.

Marinsky died on September 1, 2005, from multiple myeloma. He was buried in Pine Hill Cemetery in Buffalo. He was survived by his wife, the former Ruth Slick, to whom he was married for 63 years. They were the parents of four daughters.
