= Charles D. Coryell =

American chemist

Charles DuBois Coryell
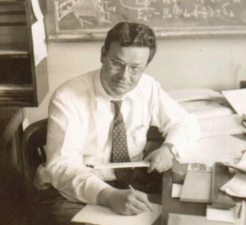
- Charles D. Coryell, M.I.T., 1947
- Born: 21 February 1912
- Died: 7 January 1971 (aged 58)
- Education: California Institute of Technology
- Scientific career
- Fields: Chemistry
- Workplaces: UCLA, University of Chicago, Clinton Laboratories, Massachusetts Institute of Technology
- Doctoral students: Arthur M. Poskanzer

Charles DuBois Coryell (February 21, 1912 – January 7, 1971) was an American chemist who was one of the discoverers of the element promethium.

Coryell earned a Ph.D. at California Institute of Technology in 1935 as the student of Arthur A. Noyes. During the late 1930s he engaged in research on the structure of hemoglobin in association with Linus Pauling. He also taught at UCLA before 1942. In 1942 he accepted a job with the Manhattan Project, for which he was Chief of the Fission Products Section, both at the University of Chicago (1942–1946) and at Clinton Laboratories (now Oak Ridge National Laboratory) in Oak Ridge, Tennessee (1943–1946). His group had responsibility for characterizing radioactive isotopes created by the fission of uranium and for developing a process for chemical separation of plutonium.

In 1945 he was a member of the Clinton Laboratories team, with Jacob Marinsky and Lawrence E. Glendenin, that isolated the previously undocumented rare-earth element 61. Marinsky and Glendenin produced this element (later named "promethium") both by extraction from fission products and by bombarding neodymium with neutrons. They isolated it using ion-exchange chromatography. Publication of the finding was delayed until later due to the war. Marinsky and Glendenin announced the discovery at a meeting of the American Chemical Society in September 1947. Upon the suggestion of Grace Mary, Coryell's wife, the team named the new element for the mythical god Prometheus, who stole fire from the gods and was punished for the act by Zeus. They had also considered naming it "clintonium" for the facility where it was isolated.

Coryell was among the Manhattan Project scientists who in 1945 signed the Szilárd petition urging President Harry S. Truman not to use the first atomic bomb "without restriction," urging him instead to "describe and demonstrate" its power and give Japan "the opportunity to consider the consequences of further refusal to surrender."

With Dr. Nathan Sugarman, Coryell was co-editor of Radiochemical Studies: The Fission Projects, a volume of 336 research papers from the Manhattan Project.

After World War II he joined the Massachusetts Institute of Technology (MIT) in 1945 as a faculty member in inorganic and radiochemistry. At MIT he conducted research in fission fine-structure and beta decay theory until his death in 1971.

In 1954 he received the Louis Lipsky Fellowship at the Weizmann Institute of Science in Rehovot, Israel. In 1960 he received the American Chemical Society's Glenn T. Seaborg Award for Nuclear Chemistry. The Charles D. Coryell Award of the Division of Nuclear Chemistry and Technology of the American Chemical Society, which is awarded annually to undergraduate students doing research projects in nuclear-related areas, is named in his honor.
