= Lawrence E. Glendenin =

American chemist

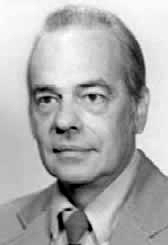
- Born: November 8, 1918; Bay City, Michigan, US
- Died: November 22, 2008 (aged 90); Illinois, US
- Education: University of Chicago, Massachusetts Institute of Technology
- Known for: promethium
- Awards: Glenn T. Seaborg Award for Nuclear Chemistry (1974)
- Scientific career
- Fields: Chemistry (nuclear)
- Workplaces: Oak Ridge National Laboratory, Argonne National Laboratory

Lawrence Elgin Glendenin (November 8, 1918 – November 22, 2008) was an American chemist from Michigan who co-discovered the element promethium.

== Biography ==
Glendenin was born in Bay City, Michigan on November 8, 1918. He attended the University of Chicago, graduating in 1941.

== Clinton Laboratories ==
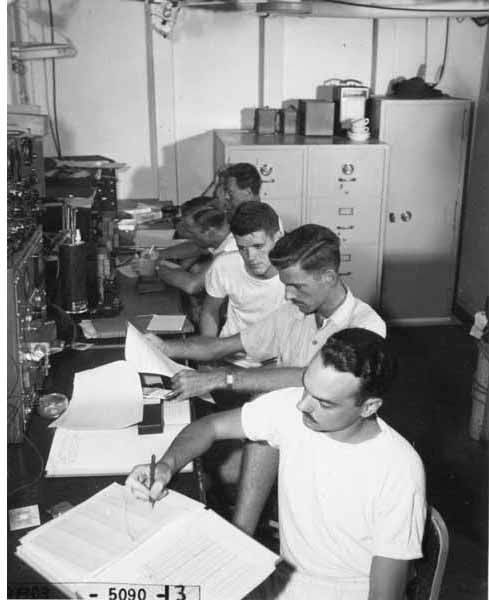
Glendenin (front) on board the USS Chilton (APA-38) during the 1947 Bikini Scientific Resurvey, researching the aftereffects of the Bikini Atoll nuclear weapons tests the previous year.

He worked as a chemist for the Clinton Laboratories (now Oak Ridge National Laboratory) during the World War II Manhattan Project, engaged in separating, identifying and characterizing the radioactive elements produced by nuclear fission. In 1945, he, together with Jacob A. Marinsky and Charles D. Coryell, isolated the previously undocumented rare-earth element 61 (promethium). Marinsky and Glendenin produced it both by extraction from fission products and by bombarding neodymium with neutrons. They isolated it using ion-exchange chromatography. Publication of the finding was delayed until later due to the war. In September 1947, Marinsky and Glendenin announced the discovery at a meeting of the American Chemical Society. Upon the suggestion of Coryell's wife, the team named the new element for the titan god Prometheus, who stole fire from the gods and was punished for the act by Zeus. They had also considered naming it "clintonium" for the facility where it was isolated.

== Szilárd petition ==
In 1945, Glendenin and 154 other Manhattan Project scientists signed the Szilárd petition. The petition urged President Harry S. Truman not to use the first atomic bomb "without restriction", urging him instead to "describe and demonstrate" its power and give Japan "the opportunity to consider the consequences of further refusal to surrender".

== Late career ==
In 1949, Glendenin earned his Ph.D. from the Massachusetts Institute of Technology. That same year he joined Argonne National Laboratory, where he worked until his retirement in 1985.

He published extensively on the properties of fission products. He served as Scientific Secretary for the U.S. delegation to the Atoms for Peace Conference and received the American Chemical Society's Glenn T. Seaborg Award for Nuclear Chemistry in 1974.

== Family and death ==
Glendenin was married for 63 years to Ethel Glendenin (née Long), who survived him at his death in November 2008. The couple were the parents of two daughters and one son.
