= Promethium =

Promethium, _{61}Pm

Promethium
- Pronunciation: /prəˈmiːθiəm/ (prə-MEE-thee-əm)
- Appearance: metallic
- Mass number: [145]

Promethium in the periodic table
Hydrogen																															Helium
Lithium	Beryllium																									Boron	Carbon	Nitrogen	Oxygen	Fluorine	Neon
Sodium	Magnesium																									Aluminium	Silicon	Phosphorus	Sulfur	Chlorine	Argon
Potassium	Calcium															Scandium	Titanium	Vanadium	Chromium	Manganese	Iron	Cobalt	Nickel	Copper	Zinc	Gallium	Germanium	Arsenic	Selenium	Bromine	Krypton
Rubidium	Strontium															Yttrium	Zirconium	Niobium	Molybdenum	Technetium	Ruthenium	Rhodium	Palladium	Silver	Cadmium	Indium	Tin	Antimony	Tellurium	Iodine	Xenon
Caesium	Barium	Lanthanum	Cerium	Praseodymium	Neodymium	Promethium	Samarium	Europium	Gadolinium	Terbium	Dysprosium	Holmium	Erbium	Thulium	Ytterbium	Lutetium	Hafnium	Tantalum	Tungsten	Rhenium	Osmium	Iridium	Platinum	Gold	Mercury (element)	Thallium	Lead	Bismuth	Polonium	Astatine	Radon
Francium	Radium	Actinium	Thorium	Protactinium	Uranium	Neptunium	Plutonium	Americium	Curium	Berkelium	Californium	Einsteinium	Fermium	Mendelevium	Nobelium	Lawrencium	Rutherfordium	Dubnium	Seaborgium	Bohrium	Hassium	Meitnerium	Darmstadtium	Roentgenium	Copernicium	Nihonium	Flerovium	Moscovium	Livermorium	Tennessine	Oganesson
–
↑
Pm
↓
Np
neodymium ← promethium → samarium
- Atomic number (Z): 61
- Group: f-block groups (no number)
- Period: period 6
- Block: f-block
- Electron configuration: [Xe] 4f^{5} 6s^{2}
- Electrons per shell: 2, 8, 18, 23, 8, 2

Physical properties
- Phase at STP: solid
- Melting point: 1315 K (1042 °C, 1908 °F)
- Boiling point: 3273 K (3000 °C, 5432 °F)
- Density (at 20° C): α-^{145}Pm: 7.149 g/cm^{3} α-^{147}Pm: 7.247 g/cm^{3}
- Heat of fusion: 7.13 kJ/mol
- Heat of vaporization: 289 kJ/mol

Atomic properties
- Oxidation states: common: +3 +2
- Electronegativity: Pauling scale: 1.13 (?)
- Ionization energies: 1st: 540 kJ/mol; 2nd: 1050 kJ/mol; 3rd: 2150 kJ/mol
- Atomic radius: empirical: 183 pm
- Covalent radius: 199 pm
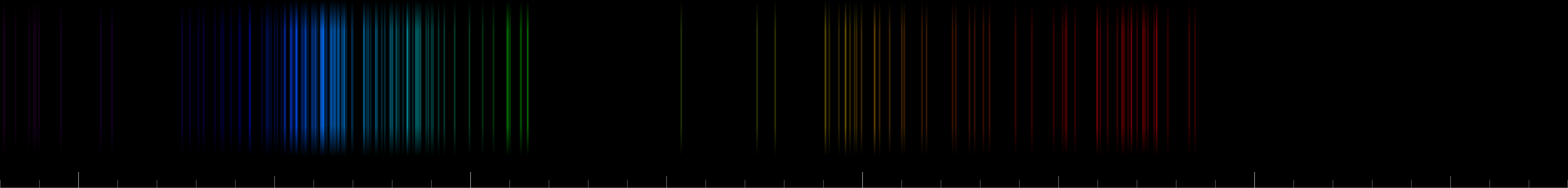
- Spectral lines of promethium

Other properties
- Natural occurrence: from decay
- Crystal structure: double hexagonal close-packed (dhcp) (hP4)
- Lattice constants: a = 0.36393 nm c = 1.1739 nm (at 20 °C)
- Thermal expansion: 9.0×10^{−6}/K (at r.t.) (Note: The thermal expansion of Pm is anisotropic: the parameters for each crystal axis (at 20 °C) are α_{a} = 11.1×10^{−6}/K, α_{c} = 15.0×10^{−6}/K, and α_{average} = α_{V}/3 = 12.4×10^{−6}/K.)
- Thermal conductivity: 17.9 W/(m⋅K)
- Electrical resistivity: est. 0.75 µΩ⋅m (at r.t.)
- Magnetic ordering: paramagnetic
- Young's modulus: α form: est. 46 GPa
- Shear modulus: α form: est. 18 GPa
- Bulk modulus: α form: est. 33 GPa
- Poisson ratio: α form: est. 0.28
- CAS Number: 7440-12-2

History
- Naming: derived from Prometheus, the Titan in Greek mythology
- Discovery: Jacob A. Marinsky, Lawrence E. Glendenin, Charles D. Coryell (1945)
- First isolation: F. Weigel (1963)
- Named by: Grace Mary Coryell (1945)

Isotopes of promethium
Main isotopes			Decay	
Isotope	abundance	half-life (t_{1/2})	mode	product
^{143}Pm	synth	265 d	ε	^{143}Nd
^{144}Pm	synth	363 d	ε	^{144}Nd
^{145}Pm	synth	17.7 y	ε	^{145}Nd
^{145}Pm	synth	17.7 y	α	^{141}Pr
^{146}Pm	synth	5.53 y	ε	^{146}Nd
^{146}Pm	synth	5.53 y	β^{−}	^{146}Sm
^{147}Pm	trace	2.6234 y	β^{−}	^{147}Sm

Promethium is a generally synthetic chemical element; it has symbol Pm and atomic number 61. All of its isotopes are radioactive; it is extremely rare, with only about 500–600 grams naturally occurring in the Earth's crust at any given time. Promethium is one of only two radioactive elements that are both preceded and succeeded in the periodic table by elements with stable forms, the other being technetium. Chemically, promethium is a lanthanide. Promethium shows only one stable oxidation state of +3.

In 1902 Bohuslav Brauner suggested that there was a then-unknown element with properties intermediate between those of the known elements neodymium (60) and samarium (62); this was confirmed in 1914 by Henry Moseley, who, having measured the atomic numbers of all the elements then known, found that the element with atomic number 61 was missing. In 1926, two groups (one Italian and one American) claimed to have isolated a sample of element 61; both "discoveries" were soon proven to be false. In 1938, during a nuclear experiment conducted at Ohio State University, a few radioactive nuclides were produced that certainly were not radioisotopes of neodymium or samarium, but there was a lack of chemical proof that element 61 was produced, and the discovery was not much recognized. Promethium was first produced and characterized at Oak Ridge National Laboratory in 1945 by the separation and analysis of the fission products of uranium fuel irradiated in a graphite reactor. The discoverers proposed the name "Prometheum" (sic; the spelling was subsequently changed), derived from Prometheus, the Titan in Greek mythology who stole fire from Mount Olympus and brought it down to humans, to symbolize "both the daring and the possible misuse of mankind's intellect". A sample of the metal was made only in 1963.

The two sources of natural promethium are rare alpha decays of natural europium-151 (producing promethium-147) and spontaneous fission of uranium (various isotopes). Promethium-145 is the most stable promethium isotope, but the only isotope with practical applications is promethium-147, chemical compounds of which are used in luminous paint, atomic batteries and thickness-measurement devices. Because natural promethium is exceedingly scarce, it is typically synthesized by bombarding uranium-235 (enriched uranium) with thermal neutrons to produce promethium-147 as a fission product.

== Properties ==
=== Physical properties ===
A promethium atom has 61 electrons, arranged in the configuration [Xe] 4f^{5} 6s^{2}. The seven 4f and 6s electrons are valence electrons. In forming compounds, the atom loses its two outermost electrons and one 4f-electron, which belongs to an open subshell. The element's atomic radius is the second largest among all the lanthanides but is only slightly greater than those of the neighboring elements. It is the most notable exception to the general trend of the contraction of lanthanide atoms with the increase of their atomic numbers (lanthanide contraction). Many properties of promethium rely on its position among lanthanides and are intermediate between those of neodymium and samarium. For example, the melting point, the first three ionization energies, and the hydration energy are greater than those of neodymium and lower than those of samarium; similarly, the estimate for the boiling point, ionic (Pm^{3+}) radius, and standard heat of formation of monatomic gas are greater than those of samarium and less than those of neodymium.

Promethium has a double hexagonal close packed (dhcp) structure and a hardness of 63 kg/mm^{2}. This low-temperature alpha form converts into a beta, body-centered cubic (bcc) phase upon heating to 890 °C.

=== Chemical properties and compounds ===
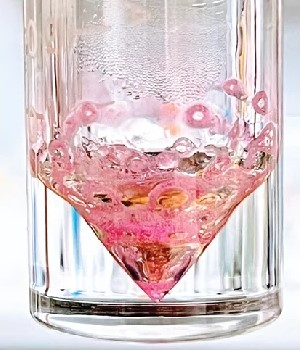
Promethium nitrate

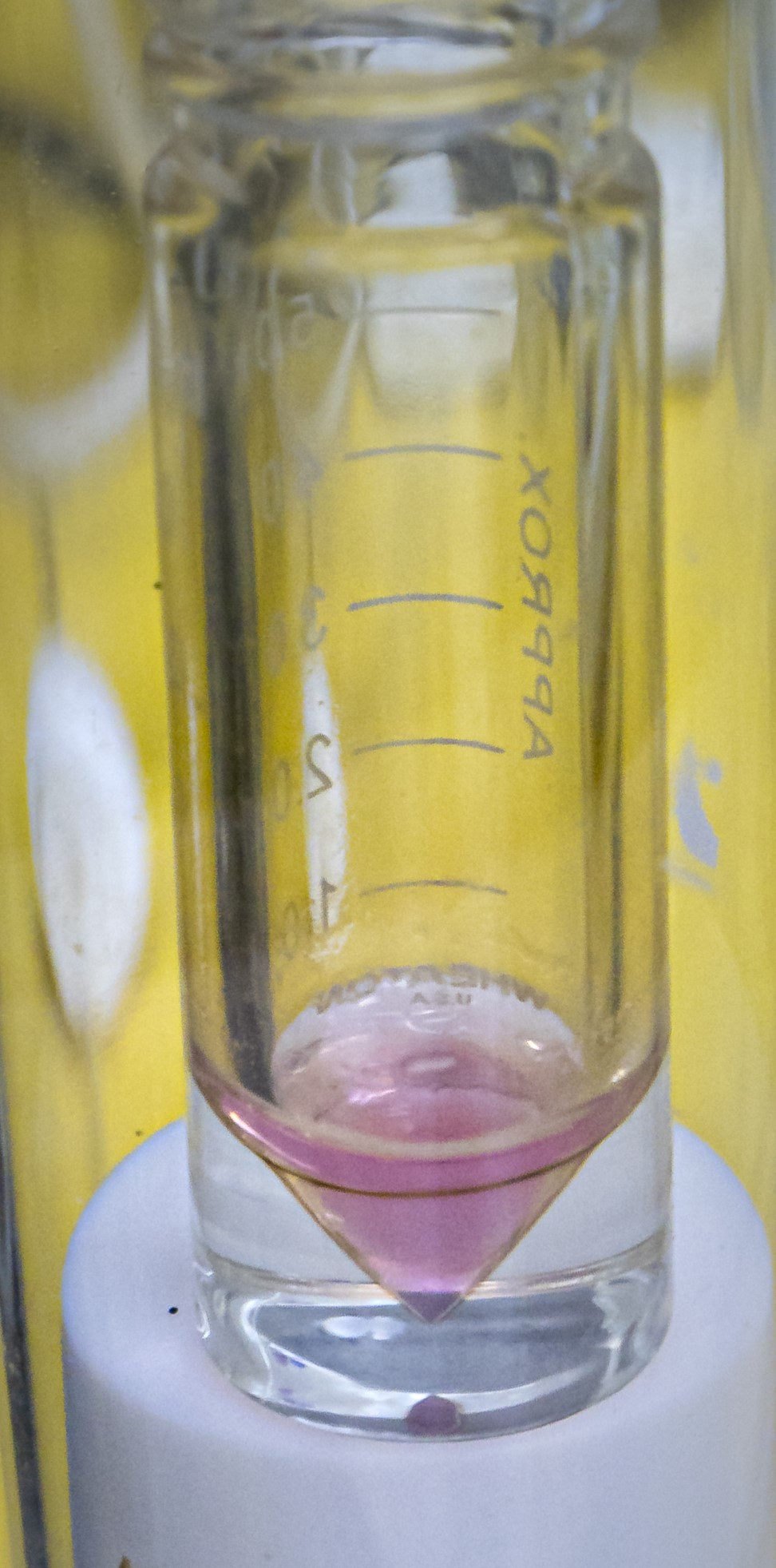
Solution containing Pm^{3+} ions

Promethium belongs to the cerium group of lanthanides and is chemically very similar to the neighboring elements. Because of its instability, chemical studies of promethium are incomplete. Even though a few compounds have been synthesized, they are not fully studied; in general, they tend to be pink or red in color. In May 2024, a promethium coordination complex with neutral PyDGA ligands was characterized in aqueous solution. Treatment of acidic solutions containing Pm^{3+} ions with ammonia results in a gelatinous light-brown sediment of hydroxide, Pm(OH)_{3}, which is insoluble in water. When dissolved in hydrochloric acid, a water-soluble yellow salt, PmCl_{3}, is produced; similarly, when dissolved in nitric acid, a nitrate results, Pm(NO_{3})_{3}. The latter is also well-soluble; when dried, it forms pink crystals, similar to Nd(NO_{3})_{3}. The electron configuration for Pm^{3+} is [Xe] 4f^{4}, and the color of the ion is pink. The ground state term symbol is ^{5}I_{4}. The sulfate is slightly soluble, like the other cerium group sulfates. Cell parameters have been calculated for its octahydrate; they led to the conclusion that the density of Pm_{2}(SO_{4})_{3}·8H_{2}O is 2.86 g/cm^{3}. The oxalate, Pm_{2}(C_{2}O_{4})_{3}·10H_{2}O, has the lowest solubility of all lanthanide oxalates.

Unlike the nitrate, the oxide is similar to the corresponding samarium salt and not the neodymium salt. As-synthesized, e.g. by heating the oxalate, it is a white or lavender-colored powder with disordered structure. This powder crystallizes in a cubic lattice upon heating to 600 °C. Further annealing at 800 °C and then at 1750 °C irreversibly transforms it to monoclinic and hexagonal phases, respectively, and the last two phases can be interconverted by adjusting the annealing time and temperature.

Formula	symmetry	space group	No	Pearson symbol	a (pm)	b (pm)	c (pm)	Z	density, g/cm^{3}
α-Pm	dhcp	P6_{3}/mmc	194	hP4	365	365	1165	4	7.26
β-Pm	bcc	Fm3̅m	225	cF4	410	410	410	4	6.99
Pm_{2}O_{3}	cubic	Ia3̅	206	cI80	1099	1099	1099	16	6.77
Pm_{2}O_{3}	monoclinic	C2/m	12	mS30	1422	365	891	6	7.40
Pm_{2}O_{3}	hexagonal	P3̅m1	164	hP5	380.2	380.2	595.4	1	7.53

Promethium forms only one stable oxidation state, +3, in the form of ions; this is in line with other lanthanides. Promethium can also form the +2 oxidation state. Thermodynamic properties of Pm^{2+} suggests that the dihalides are stable, similar to NdCl_{2} and SmCl_{2}.

Promethium halides
Formula	color	coordination number	symmetry	space group	No	Pearson symbol	m.p. (°C)
PmF_{3}	Purple-pink	11	hexagonal	P3̅c1	165	hP24	1338
PmCl_{3}	Lavender	9	hexagonal	P6_{3}/mc	176	hP8	655
PmBr_{3}	Red	8	orthorhombic	Cmcm	63	oS16	624
α-PmI_{3}	Red	8	orthorhombic	Cmcm	63	oS16	α→β
β-PmI_{3}	Red	6	rhombohedral	R3̅	148	hR24	695

=== Isotopes ===
Promethium is the only lanthanide and one of only two elements among the first 83 with no stable or long-lived (primordial) isotopes. This is a result of a rarely occurring effect of the liquid drop model of the nucleus and stabilities of neighbor element isotopes; it is also the least stable element of the first 84 elements. The primary decay products are neodymium and samarium isotopes (promethium-146 decays to both, the lighter isotopes generally to neodymium via positron decay and electron capture, and the heavier isotopes to samarium via beta decay). Promethium nuclear isomers may decay to other promethium isotopes and one isotope (^{145}Pm) has a very rare alpha decay mode to stable praseodymium-141.

The most stable isotope of the element is promethium-145, which has a specific activity of 139 Ci/g (5.1 TBq/g) and a half-life of 17.7 years via electron capture. Because it has 84 neutrons (two more than 82, which is a magic number corresponding to a stable neutron configuration), it may emit an alpha particle (which has 2 neutrons) to form praseodymium-141 with 82 neutrons. Thus, it is the only promethium isotope with an experimentally observed alpha decay. Its partial half-life for alpha decay is about 6.3×10^{9} years, and the relative probability for a ^{145}Pm nucleus to decay in this way is 2.8×10^{−7} %. Several other promethium isotopes such as ^{144}Pm, ^{146}Pm, and ^{147}Pm also have a positive energy release for alpha decay; their alpha decays are predicted to occur but have not been observed. In total, 41 isotopes of promethium are known, ranging from ^{126}Pm to ^{166}Pm.

The element also has 18 nuclear isomers, with mass numbers of 133 to 142, 144, 148, 149, 152, and 154 (some mass numbers have more than one isomer). The most stable of them is promethium-148m, with a half-life of 41.3 days; this is longer than the half-lives of its ground state, and all promethium isotopes except for 143-147.

== Occurrence ==
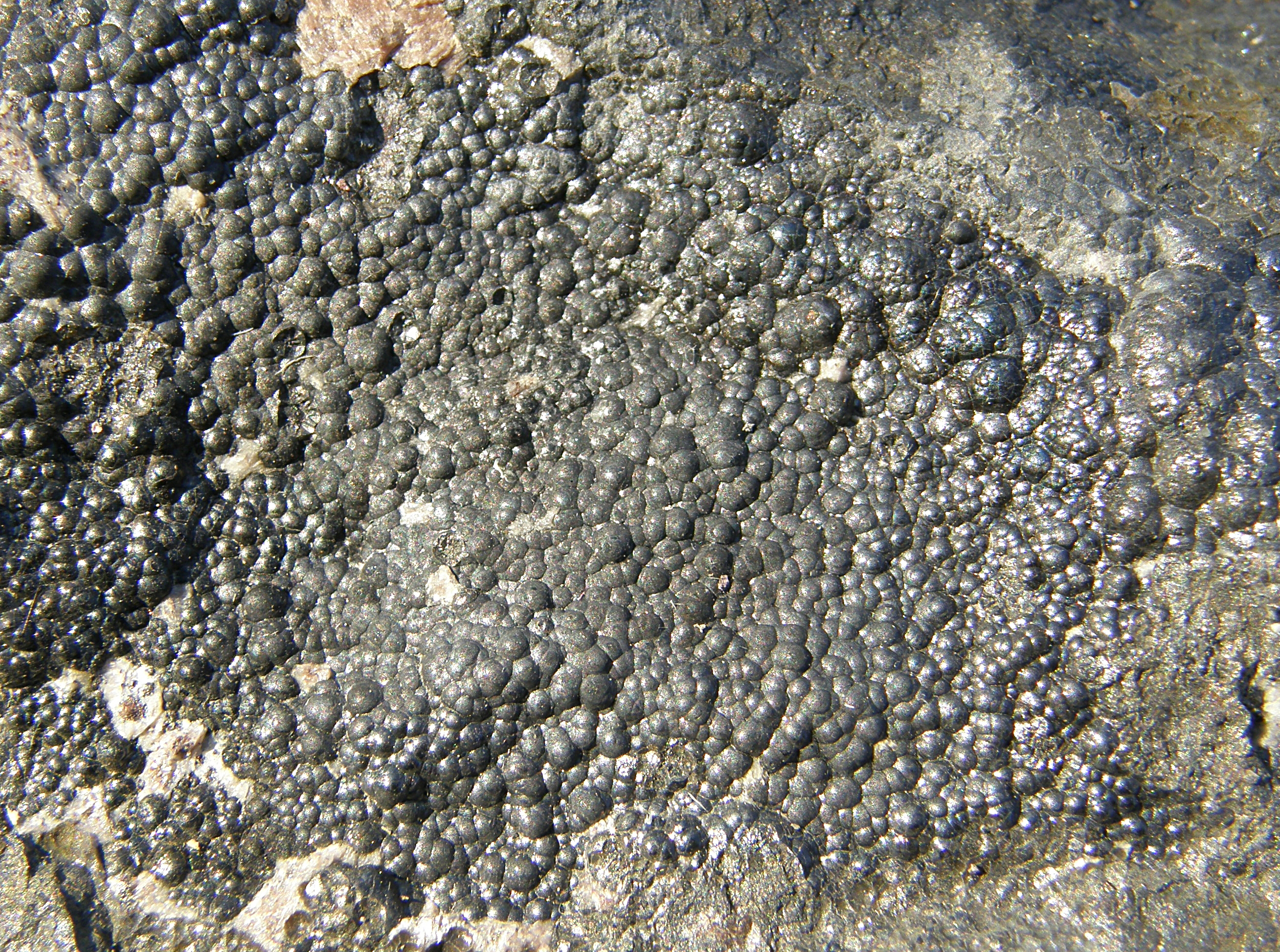
Uraninite, a uranium ore and the host for most of Earth's promethium

In 1934, Willard Libby reported that he had found weak beta activity in pure neodymium, which was attributed to a half-life over 10^{12} years. Almost 20 years later, it was claimed that the element occurs in natural neodymium in equilibrium in quantities below 10^{−20} grams of promethium per one gram of neodymium. However, these observations were disproved by newer investigations, because for all seven naturally occurring neodymium isotopes, any single beta decays (which can produce promethium isotopes) are forbidden by energy conservation. In particular, careful measurements of atomic masses show that the mass difference between ^{150}Nd and ^{150}Pm is negative (−87 keV), which absolutely prevents the single beta decay of ^{150}Nd to ^{150}Pm.

In 1965, Olavi Erämetsä separated out traces of ^{147}Pm from a rare earth concentrate purified from apatite, resulting in an upper limit of 10^{−21} for the abundance of promethium in nature; this may have been produced by the natural nuclear fission of uranium, or by neutron capture of ^{146}Nd.

Both isotopes of natural europium have larger mass excesses than sums of those of their potential alpha daughters plus that of an alpha particle; therefore, they (stable in practice) may alpha decay to promethium. Research at Laboratori Nazionali del Gran Sasso showed that europium-151 decays to promethium-147 with the half-life of 5×10^{18} years; later measurements gave the half-life as (4.62 ± 0.95(stat.) ± 0.68(syst.)) × 10^{18} years. It has been shown that europium is "responsible" for about 12 grams of promethium in the Earth's crust. Alpha decays for europium-153 have not been found yet, and its theoretically calculated half-life is so high (due to low energy of decay) that this process will probably not be observed in the near future.

Promethium can also be formed in nature as a product of spontaneous fission of uranium-238. Only trace amounts can be found in naturally occurring ores: a sample of pitchblende has been found to contain promethium at a concentration of four parts per quintillion (4×10^{−18}) by mass. Uranium is thus "responsible" for 560 g of promethium in Earth's crust.

Promethium has also been identified in the spectrum of the star HR 465 in Andromeda; it also has been found in HD 101065 (Przybylski's star) and HD 965. Because of the short half-life of promethium isotopes, they should be formed near the surface of those stars.

== History ==
=== Searches for element 61 ===
In 1902, Czech chemist Bohuslav Brauner found out that the differences in properties between neodymium and samarium were the largest between any two consecutive lanthanides in the sequence then known; as a conclusion, he suggested there was an element with intermediate properties between them. This prediction was supported in 1914 by Henry Moseley who, having discovered that atomic number was an experimentally measurable property of elements, found that a few atomic numbers had no known corresponding elements: the gaps were 43, 61, 72, 75, 85, and 87. With the knowledge of a gap in the periodic table several groups started to search for the predicted element among other rare earths in the natural environment.

The first claim of a discovery was published by Luigi Rolla and Lorenzo Fernandes of Florence, Italy. After separating a mixture of a few rare earth elements nitrate concentrate from the Brazilian mineral monazite by fractionated crystallization, they yielded a solution containing mostly samarium. This solution gave x-ray spectra attributed to samarium and element 61. In honor of their city, they named element 61 "florentium". The results were published in 1926, but the scientists claimed that the experiments were done in 1924. Also in 1926, a group of scientists from the University of Illinois at Urbana–Champaign, Smith Hopkins and Len Yntema published the discovery of element 61. They named it "illinium", after the university. Both of these reported discoveries were shown to be erroneous because the spectrum line that "corresponded" to element 61 was identical to that of didymium; the lines thought to belong to element 61 turned out to belong to a few impurities (barium, chromium, and platinum).

In 1934, Josef Mattauch finally formulated the isobar rule. One of the indirect consequences of this rule was that element 61 was unable to form stable isotopes. From 1938, a nuclear experiment was conducted by H. B. Law et al. at the Ohio State University. Nuclides were produced in 1941 which were not radioisotopes of neodymium or samarium, and the name "cyclonium" was proposed, but there was a lack of chemical proof that element 61 was produced and the discovery was not largely recognized.

=== Discovery and synthesis of promethium metal ===
Promethium was first produced and characterized at Oak Ridge National Laboratory (Clinton Laboratories at that time) in 1945 by Jacob A. Marinsky, Lawrence E. Glendenin and Charles D. Coryell by separation and analysis of the fission products of uranium fuel irradiated in the graphite reactor; however, being too busy with military-related research during World War II, they did not announce their discovery until 1947. The original proposed name was "clintonium", after the laboratory where the work was conducted; however, the name "prometheum" was suggested by Grace Mary Coryell, the wife of one of the discoverers. It is derived from Prometheus, the Titan in Greek mythology who stole fire from Mount Olympus and brought it down to humans and symbolizes "both the daring and the possible misuse of the mankind intellect". The spelling was then changed to "promethium", as this was in accordance with most other metals.

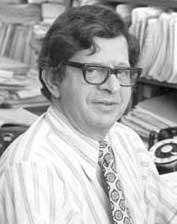
Jacob A. Marinsky

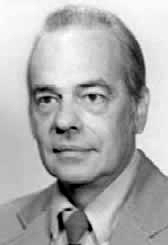
Lawrence E. Glendenin

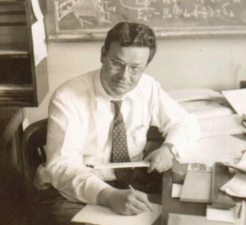
Charles D. Coryell

In 1963, promethium(III) fluoride was used to make promethium metal. Provisionally purified from impurities of samarium, neodymium, and americium, it was put into a tantalum crucible which was located in another tantalum crucible; the outer crucible contained lithium metal (10 times excess compared to promethium). After creating a vacuum, the chemicals were mixed to produce promethium metal:

PmF_{3} + 3 Li → Pm + 3 LiF

The promethium sample produced was used to measure a few of the metal's properties, such as its melting point.

In 1963, ion-exchange methods were used at ORNL to prepare about ten grams of promethium from nuclear reactor fuel processing wastes.

Promethium can be either recovered from the byproducts of uranium fission or produced by bombarding ^{146}Nd with neutrons, turning it into ^{147}Nd, which decays into ^{147}Pm through beta decay with a half-life of 11 days.

== Production ==
The production methods for different isotopes vary, and only those for promethium-147 are given because it is the only isotope with industrial applications. Promethium-147 is produced in large quantities (compared to other isotopes) by bombarding uranium-235 with thermal neutrons. The output is relatively high, at 2.6% of the total product. Another way to produce promethium-147 is via neodymium-147, which decays to promethium-147 with a short half-life. Neodymium-147 can be obtained either by bombarding enriched neodymium-146 with thermal neutrons or by bombarding a uranium carbide target with energetic protons in a particle accelerator. Another method is to bombard uranium-238 with fast neutrons to cause fast fission, which, among multiple reaction products, creates promethium-147.

Promethium is chemically extracted by dissolving irradiated targets in concentrated nitric acid and separating the plutonium - 238 fuel followed by treating the water with camphor-BTP ligand to remove curium contaminants. The solution is then washed through LN extraction resins and cation exchange chromatography columns using an α-HIBA eluent. Due to promethium ions having a unique ionic radius, they elute from the column at a distinct time, leaving behind a nearly pure milligram batch.

As early as the 1960s, Oak Ridge National Laboratory could produce 650 grams of promethium per year⟨+Lavrukhina & Pozdnyakov 1966+⟩ and was the world's only large-volume synthesis facility.⟨+ref2+⟩ Gram-scale production of promethium was discontinued in the U.S. in the early 1980s, and is now produced in estimated quantities of only 20 to 30 milligrams per year (not verified, very rough estimate)at the High Flux Isotope Reactor as a byproduct of accidental fission of plutonium produced using NASA's waste neptunium. In 2010, Russia was the only country producing promethium-147 on a relatively large scale.⟨+Russia+⟩

== Applications ==
Promethium(III) chloride being used in luminous paint inside of an electric blanket's button

Only promethium-147 has uses outside laboratories.⟨Emsley 2011⟩ It is obtained as the oxide or chloride,⟨Lavrukhina & Pozdnyakov 1966⟩ in milligram quantities.⟨Emsley 2011⟩ This isotope has a relatively long half-life and its radiation has a relatively small penetration depth in matter.⟨Lavrukhina & Pozdnyakov 1966⟩

Some signal lights use a luminous paint containing a phosphor that absorbs the beta radiation emitted by promethium-147 and emits light.⟨CRCel⟩⟨Emsley 2011⟩ This isotope does not cause aging of the phosphor, as alpha emitters do,⟨Lavrukhina & Pozdnyakov 1966⟩ and therefore the light emission is stable for a few years.⟨Lavrukhina & Pozdnyakov 1966⟩ Originally, radium-226 was used for the purpose, but it was later replaced by promethium-147 and tritium (hydrogen-3). Promethium may be favored over tritium for nuclear safety.

In atomic batteries, the beta particles emitted by promethium-147 are converted into electric current by sandwiching a small promethium source between two semiconductor plates. These batteries have a useful lifetime of about five years.⟨brit⟩⟨CRCel⟩⟨Emsley 2011⟩ The first promethium-based battery was assembled in 1964 and generated "a few milliwatts of power from a volume of about 2 cubic inches, including shielding".⟨ref3⟩

Promethium is also used to measure the thickness of materials by measuring the amount of radiation from a promethium source that passes through the sample. It has possible future uses in portable X-ray sources, and as auxiliary heat or power sources for space probes and satellites (although the alpha emitter plutonium-238 has become standard for most space-exploration-related uses).

Promethium-147 is also used, albeit in very small quantities (less than 330nCi), in some Philips brand (Compact fluorescent lamp) glow switches in the PLC 22W/28W 15mm CFL range.⟨ref4⟩

== Precautions ==
Promethium, similar to most other lanthanides, has no biological role. Promethium-147 can emit gamma rays, which are dangerous for all lifeforms, during its beta decay.⟨Simmons1964⟩ Interactions with tiny quantities of promethium-147 are not hazardous if certain precautions are observed.⟨Army1987⟩ In general, gloves, footwear covers, safety glasses, and an outer layer of easily removed protective clothing should be used.⟨Pmlist⟩

It is not known what human organs are affected by interaction with promethium; a possible candidate is the bone tissues. Sealed promethium-147 is not dangerous. However, if the packaging is damaged, then promethium becomes dangerous to the environment and humans. If radioactive contamination is found, the contaminated area should be washed with water and soap, but, even though promethium mainly affects the skin, the skin should not be abraded. If a promethium leak is found, the area should be identified as hazardous and evacuated, and emergency services must be contacted. No dangers from promethium aside from the radioactivity are known.

== Bibliography ==
- Emsley, John (2011). Nature's Building Blocks: An A-Z Guide to the Elements. Oxford University Press. pp. 428–430. ISBN 978-0-19-960563-7.
- Lavrukhina, Avgusta Konstantinovna; Pozdnyakov, Aleksandr Aleksandrovich (1966). Аналитическая химия технеция, прометия, астатина и франция (Analytical Chemistry of Technetium, Promethium, Astatine, and Francium) (in Russian). Nauka.
- 2013, E.R. Scerri,A tale of seven elements, Oxford University Press, Oxford, ISBN 9780195391312
