= Cerium(III) tungstate =

Names
- Other names Cerium tungstate

Identifiers
CAS Number	13454-74-5
3D model (JSmol)	Interactive image
ChemSpider	13285866
ECHA InfoCard	100.033.295
EC Number	236-639-9
PubChem CID	16213782
CompTox Dashboard (EPA)	DTXSID20584115
- InChI: InChI=1S/2Ce.12O.3W/q2*+3;;;;;;;6*-1;;; Key: JUXLQRHSAFOZOE-UHFFFAOYSA-N
- SMILES: [O-][W](=O)(=O)[O-].[O-][W](=O)(=O)[O-].[O-][W](=O)(=O)[O-].[Ce+3].[Ce+3]

Properties
Chemical formula	Ce_{2}(WO_{4})_{3}
Molar mass	1023.78 g/mol
Appearance	Whitish solid
Density	6.77 g/cm^{3}
Melting point	1,089 °C (1,992 °F; 1,362 K)
Solubility in water	Practically insoluble in water

Structure
Crystal structure	Monoclinic
Space group	C2/c, No. 15
Lattice constant	a = 0.7813 nm, b = 1.1720 nm, c = 1.1586 nm α = 90°, β = 109.36°, γ = 90°
Formula units (Z)	4
- Except where otherwise noted, data are given for materials in their standard state (at 25 °C [77 °F], 100 kPa). Infobox references

Cerium(III) tungstate is an inorganic compound of cerium and the tungstate ion, with the chemical formula Ce_{2}(WO_{4})_{3}. It is a whitish, water-insoluble crystalline solid.

== Structure and properties ==
Cerium(III) tungstate crystallizes in the monoclinic crystal system, in space group C2/c (No. 15), and is isotypic with europium(III) tungstate. The unit-cell parameters are a = 7.813(4) Å, b = 11.720(2) Å, c = 11.586(3) Å and β = 109.36(3)°, with four formula units per unit cell.

The crystal structure contains one crystallographically distinct Ce^{3+} site. Each cerium ion is coordinated by eight oxygen atoms in a distorted capped trigonal prismatic environment. Unlike many simple tungstates containing only tetrahedral WO_{4} groups, Ce_{2}(WO_{4})_{3} contains both WO_{4} tetrahedra and square pyramidal WO_{5} units.

Nanocrystalline Ce_{2}(WO_{4})_{3} exhibits optical absorption and photoluminescence characteristic of tungstate-containing materials. A broad blue emission has been attributed primarily to electronic transitions associated with the tungstate groups.

The optical band gap of nanocrystalline samples depends on preparation and calcination conditions, decreasing as calcination temperature is increased.

== Preparation ==
Cerium(III) tungstate can be prepared by precipitation from aqueous solutions of cerium(III) nitrate and sodium tungstate. This method has also been used to prepare nanoscale Ce_{2}(WO_{4})_{3}.

A simplified precipitation reaction is:

2 Ce(NO_{3})_{3} + 3 Na_{2}WO_{4} → Ce_{2}(WO_{4})_{3}↓ + 6 NaNO_{3}

Single crystals have been grown from molten mixtures of cerium(IV) oxide and tungsten trioxide.

The overall reaction may be written as:

4 CeO_{2} + 6 WO_{3} → 2 Ce_{2}(WO_{4})_{3} + O_{2}

The formation of Ce(III) from Ce(IV) during this high-temperature synthesis is supported by thermogravimetric and magnetic measurements.

== Applications ==
Cerium(III) tungstate has been investigated as a luminescent and optoelectronic material. Its blue photoluminescence has led to research into its potential use in near-ultraviolet-excited light-emitting devices and related optical applications.

Nanostructured Ce_{2}(WO_{4})_{3} and composites containing it have also been investigated as photocatalysts for degradation of organic contaminants.
