= Cerium oxide =

Cerium oxide may refer to:

- Cerium(III) oxide, Ce_{2}O_{3}, also known as dicerium trioxide
- Cerium(III,IV) oxide, Ce_{3}O_{4} (dark blue)
- Cerium(IV) oxide, CeO_{2}, also known as ceric oxide
