= Cerium(III) arsenate =

Names
- Other names Cerous arsenate

Identifiers
| CAS Number | 15479-76-2 |
| 3D model (JSmol) | Interactive image |
| PubChem CID | 22138169 |
- InChI: InChI=1S/AsH3O4.Ce/c2-1(3,4)5;/h(H3,2,3,4,5);/q;+3/p-3 Key: QPPXJNWHBZCTLP-UHFFFAOYSA-K
- SMILES: [O-][As](=O)([O-])[O-].[Ce+3]

Properties
| Chemical formula | CeAsO_{4} |
| Molar mass | 279.04 g/mol |
| Appearance | Colorless crystalline solid |

Structure
| Crystal structure | Monoclinic, monazite type |
| Space group | P2_{1}/n, No. 14 |
- Except where otherwise noted, data are given for materials in their standard state (at 25 °C [77 °F], 100 kPa). Infobox references

Cerium(III) arsenate is an inorganic compound of cerium in the +3 oxidation state and the arsenate ion, with the formula CeAsO_{4}. It crystallizes in the monoclinic monazite structure type and is the synthetic analogue of the rare mineral gasparite-(Ce).

== Preparation ==
Cerium(III) arsenate has been prepared by a high-temperature solid-state reaction involving cerium(IV) oxide, potassium carbonate and ammonium dihydrogen arsenate.

In the reported synthesis, the starting materials were mixed in a 4:1:3 molar ratio and heated at 1073 K.

Earlier crystal-growth experiments using CeO_{2} and molten lead pyroarsenate also produced red to amber crystals nominally assigned to CeAsO_{4}, although their coloration suggested that the cerium valence state may not have been purely +3.

== Properties ==
=== Crystal structure ===
CeAsO_{4} crystallizes in the monoclinic crystal system, space group P2_{1}/n (No. 14), with the monazite structure type. The structure is built from CeO_{8} coordination polyhedra and AsO_{4} tetrahedra joined by shared corners and edges.

The CeO_{8} polyhedra and AsO_{4} tetrahedra form chains parallel to the [001] direction. Each cerium coordination polyhedron is connected to several neighboring arsenate tetrahedra and cerium polyhedra, giving a dense three-dimensional framework.

This structural type is typical of light rare-earth arsenates. In contrast, arsenates of the smaller heavy rare-earth ions more commonly adopt the tetragonal xenotime-type structure.

=== Relationship to gasparite-(Ce) ===
Natural Ce-dominant arsenate occurs as gasparite-(Ce), a rare mineral with the same monazite-type structure as synthetic CeAsO_{4}.

Natural gasparite-(Ce) is generally a solid solution containing substantial La, Nd and other rare-earth elements rather than ideal pure CeAsO_{4}.

High-pressure single-crystal diffraction on natural gasparite-(Ce) found no structural phase transition up to about 22 GPa. Compression is accommodated mainly by deformation of the rare-earth coordination polyhedra, while the AsO_{4} tetrahedra remain comparatively rigid.
