= Thorianite =

Thorium oxide mineral

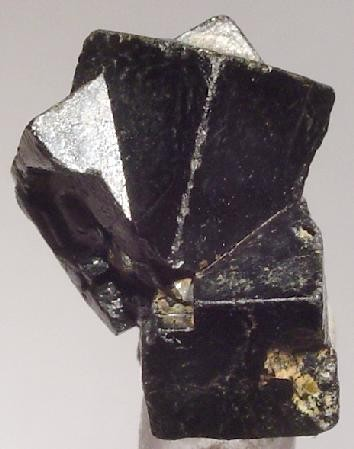
- Group of interpenetrating twinned thorianite crystals from Ambatofotsy, Madagascar (size: 1.6 x 1.4 x 1.3 cm)

General
- Category: Oxide mineral
- Formula: Thorium oxide, ThO_{2}
- IMA symbol: Tho
- Strunz classification: 4.DL.05
- Crystal system: Isometric
- Crystal class: Hexoctahedral (m3̅m); H-M symbol: (4/m 3̅ 2/m)
- Space group: Fm3m
- Unit cell: a = 5.595 Å; Z = 4

Identification
- Color: Dark gray, brown-black
- Crystal habit: Cubic crystals, usually rounded to some degree in detrital deposits
- Twinning: Penetration twins on {111} common
- Cleavage: Poor/Indistinct
- Fracture: Irregular to uneven, sub-conchoidal
- Mohs scale hardness: 6.5 – 7
- Luster: Resinous, sub-metallic
- Streak: Grey, grey green to black
- Diaphaneity: Opaque, translucent on thin edges
- Specific gravity: 9.7
- Optical properties: Isotropic
- Refractive index: n = 2.20 – 2.35
- Other characteristics: Radioactive

Thorianite is a rare thorium oxide mineral, ThO_{2}. It was originally described by Ananda Coomaraswamy in 1904 as uraninite, but recognized as a new species by Wyndham R. Dunstan. It was so named by Dunstan on account of its high percentage of thorium; it also contains the oxides of uranium, lanthanum, cerium, praseodymium and neodymium. Helium is present, and the mineral is slightly less radioactive than pitchblende, but is harder to shield due to its high energy gamma rays. It is common in the alluvial gem-gravels of Sri Lanka, where it occurs mostly as water-worn, small, heavy, black, cubic crystals. The largest crystals are usually near 1.5 cm. Larger crystals, up to 6 cm (2.4 in), have been reported from Madagascar.

== Chemistry ==
Based on color, specific gravity and composition three types of thorianite are distinguished:

- α-thorianite
- β-thorianite
- γ-thorianite

Thorianite and uraninite form a complete solid solution series in synthetic and natural material. The division between the two species is at Th:U = 1:1 with uranium possibly making up to 46.50% and thorium ranging up to 87.88%. Rare earths, chiefly cerium, substitute for thorium in amounts up to 8% by mass. Cerium is probably present as Ce^{4+}. Complete series is known in synthetic material between CeO_{2} - PrO_{2} - ThO_{2} - UO_{2}. Small amounts of Fe^{3+} and zirconium also may be isomorphous with thorium. Lead present is probably radiogenic.

== Varieties ==
- Aldanite – a variety of thorianite containing 14.9% to 29.0% UO_{2} and 11.2% to 12.5% PbO.
- Uranothorianite
- Thorianite Cerian
- Thorianite La bearing

== Occurrence ==
Usually found in alluvial deposits, beach sands, heavy mineral placers, and pegmatites.

- Sri Lanka – In stream gravels, Galle district, Southern Province; Balangoda district; near Kodrugala, Sabaragamuwa Province; and from a pegmatite in Bambarabotuwa area.
- India – Reported from beach sands of Travancore (Kerala).
- Madagascar – Found in alluvial deposits of Betroka and Andolobe. Also as very large crystals from Fort Dauphin; at Andranondambo and other localities.
- Russia – In black sands of a gold placer on Boshogoch River, Transbaikalia, Siberia; in the Kovdor Massif by Kovdor, Kola Peninsula; in the Yenisei Range, Siberia.
- United States – reported from Easton, Pennsylvania; black sands in Missouri River, near Helena, Montana; Scott River, Siskiyou County, California; black sands in Nixon Fork and Wiseman districts, Alaska.
- Canada – Reported with uraninite in a pegmatite on Charlebois Lake, east of Lake Athabasca; Uranon variety reported from pegmatite and metasomatized zones in crystalline limestones from many locations in Quebec and Ontario.
- South Africa – Occurs with baddeleyite as an accessory in carbonatite at Phalaborwa, Eastern Transvaal.
- Democratic Republic of Congo - Kasaï region

== See also ==
- Uraninite
- Thorite
- Classification of minerals
- List of minerals
