= Cerocene =

Names
- IUPAC name Bis(η8-cyclooctatetraene)cerium
- Other names Cerium di-cyclooctatraene

Identifiers
CAS Number	37205-27-9
3D model (JSmol)	Interactive image
- InChI: Key: XMGBAYFIOLSVIM-YTBUGUEYSA-N; InChI=1S/2C8H6.Ce/c2*1-2-4-6-8-7-5-3-1;/h2*1-3,6-8H;/q2*-2;+4/b2*2-1-,3-1?,8-6?,8-7-;
- SMILES: C\1=C\[C-]=C/C=C\[C-]=C1.C\1=C\[C-]=C/C=C\[C-]=C1.[Ce+4]

Properties
Chemical formula	Ce(C_{8}H_{8})_{2}
Molar mass	348.423
Appearance	red crystal
Melting point	290 °C (With Decomposition)
- Except where otherwise noted, data are given for materials in their standard state (at 25 °C [77 °F], 100 kPa). Infobox references

Cerocene is a organometallic complex with the chemical formula Ce(C_{8}H_{8})_{2} (Ce(cot)_{2}). It is a sandwich compound consisting of a central cerium atom and two cyclooctatetraenide rings.

== Preparation ==
Cerocene can be prepared by reducing cerium(III) di-cyclooctatraene anion salts:

Ce(C_{8}H_{8})_{2}K → Ce(C_{8}H_{8})_{2} + K^{+}

== Chemical properties ==
Cerocene decomposes when exposed to water or oxygen to yield non-stoichiometric cerium-oxides and cyclooctratraene derivitives.

It undergoes a disproportionation, leading to an equilibrium between cerocene and a double-decker structure containing two cerium atoms:

2 Ce(C_{8}H_{8})_{2} ⇌ Ce_{2}(C_{8}H_{8})_{3} + C_{8}H_{8}

Although the cyclooctatetraenide ligand is usually considered a dianion and therefore cerocene is identified as a Ce(IV) complex, theoretical and experimental analysis of the compound indicates that is more correctly described containing a Ce(III) atom.

== Related compounds ==
Cerocene is a known precursor for uranocene, U(C_{8}H_{8})_{2}:

Ce(C_{8}H_{8})_{2} + UCl_{3} ⇌ U(C_{8}H_{8})_{2} + CeCl_{3}

Cerocene is commonly confused with the compound tris(cyclopentadienyl)cerium.
