= Cerianite-(Ce) =

Oxide mineral

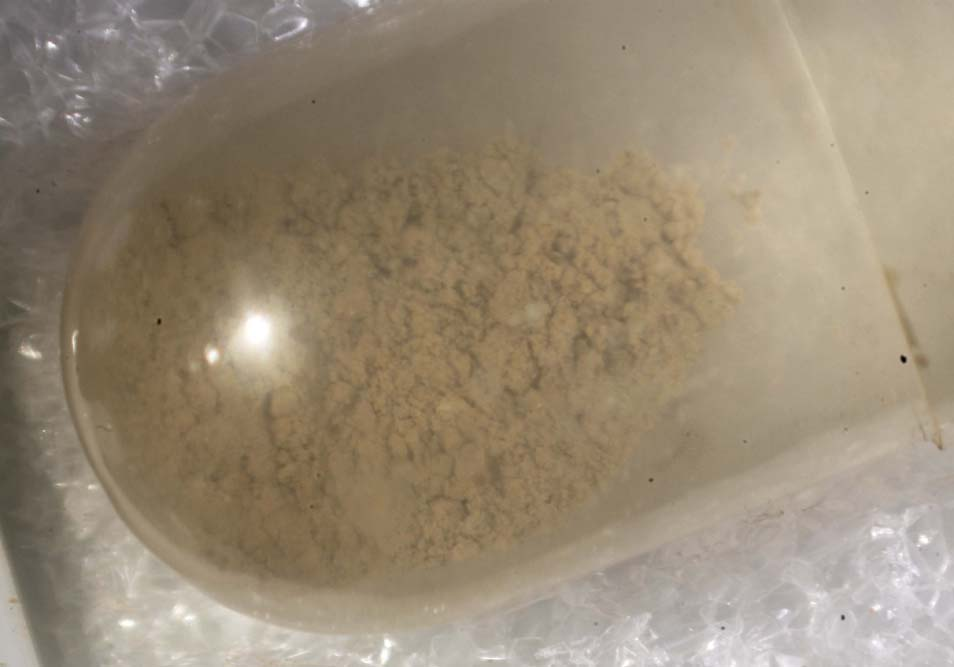
- Yellow powder of the very rare mineral cerianite-(Ce) from Morro do Ferro, Caldas, Minas Gerais, Brazil.

General
- Category: Oxide
- Formula: (Ce,Th)O_{2}
- IMA symbol: Cei-Ce
- Crystal system: Isometric
- Crystal class: Hexoctahedral (m3̅m); H-M symbol: (4/m 3̅ 2/m)
- Space group: Fm3̅m
- Unit cell: a = 5.42 Å; Z = 4

Identification
- Color: Dark greenish amber-yellow, yellow, buff
- Crystal habit: octahedra; earthy, massive
- Diaphaneity: Translucent or transparent
- Density: 7.20 (synth. material, calc.; approximated)
- Other characteristics: Radioactive

Cerianite-(Ce) is a relatively rare oxide mineral, belonging to uraninite group with the formula (Ce,Th)O_{2}. It is one of a few currently known minerals containing essential tetravalent cerium, the other examples being stetindite and dyrnaesite-(La).

== Occurrence and association ==
Cerianite-(Ce) is associated with alkaline rocks, mostly nepheline syenites. It may be found in carbonatites. Cerianite-(Ce) associates with minerals of the apatite group, bastnäsite-group minerals, calcite, feldspar, "fluocerite", "hydromica", ilmenite, nepheline, magnetite, "törnebohmite" and tremolite. It is the simplest cerium mineral known.

== Notes on chemistry ==
Beside thorium cerianite-(Ce) may contain trace niobium, yttrium, lanthanum, ytterbium, zirconium and tantalum.

== Crystal structure ==
For details on crystal structure see cerium(IV) oxide. Both ceria and thoria have a fluorite structure.
