= Thorium dioxide =

Chemical compound

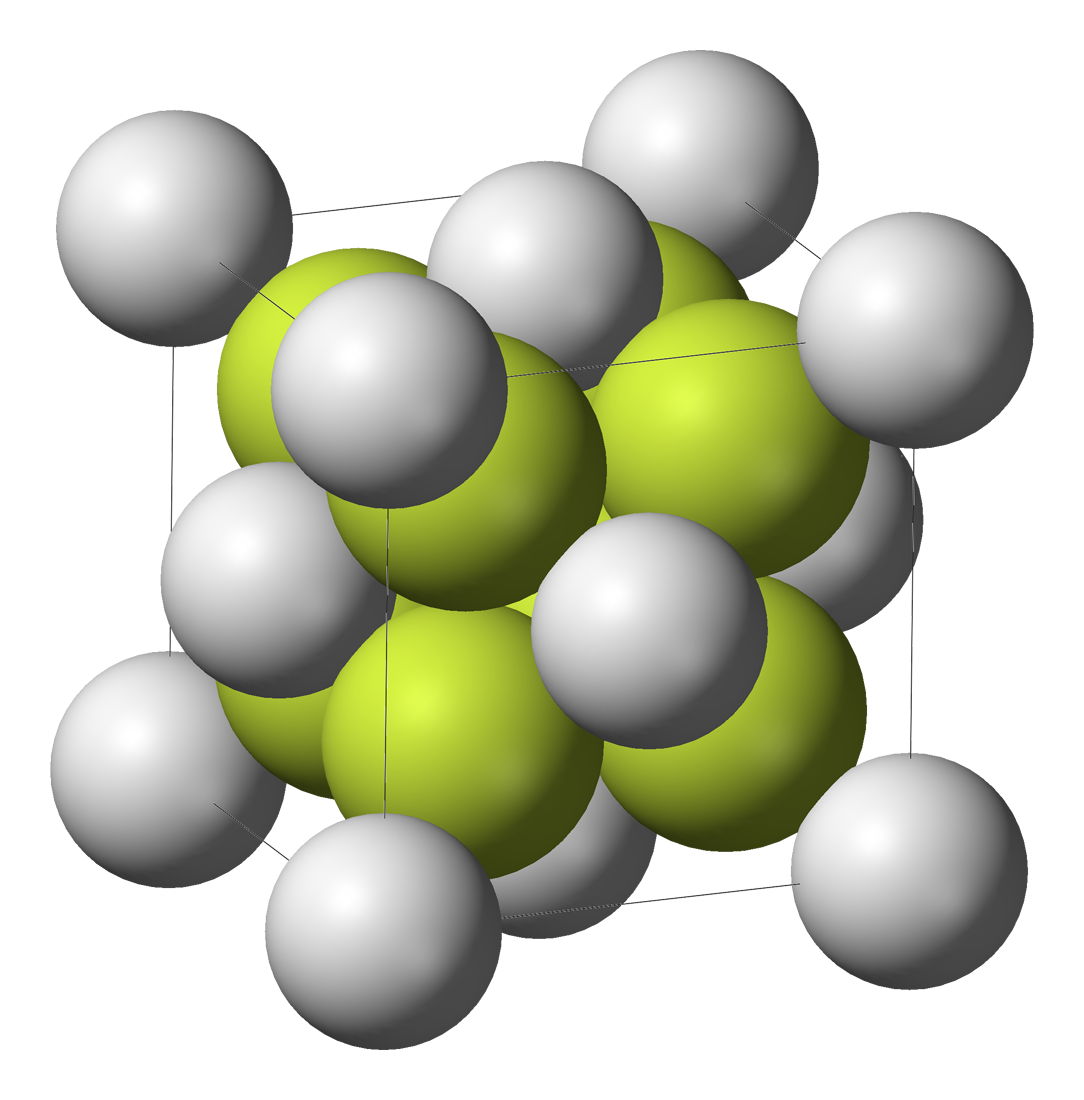

Names
- IUPAC name Thorium(IV) oxide
- Other names Thorium dioxide Thoria; Thorium anhydride

Identifiers
CAS Number	1314-20-1
3D model (JSmol)	Interactive image
ChEBI	CHEBI:37339
ChemSpider	14124
ECHA InfoCard	100.013.842
EC Number	215-225-1
Gmelin Reference	141638
PubChem CID	14808
UNII	9XA7X17UQC
UN number	2910 2909
CompTox Dashboard (EPA)	DTXSID0051657
- InChI: Key: ZCUFMDLYAMJYST-UHFFFAOYSA-N; InChI=1S/2O.Th
- SMILES: O=[Th]=O

Properties
Chemical formula	ThO_{2}
Molar mass	264.037 g/mol
Appearance	white solid
Odor	odorless
Density	10.0 g/cm^{3}
Melting point	3,350 °C (6,060 °F; 3,620 K)
Boiling point	4,400 °C (7,950 °F; 4,670 K)
Solubility in water	insoluble
Solubility	insoluble in alkali slightly soluble in acid
Magnetic susceptibility (χ)	−16.0·10^{−6} cm^{3}/mol
Refractive index (n_{D})	2.200 (thorianite)

Structure
Crystal structure	Fluorite (cubic), cF12
Space group	Fm3̅m, No. 225
Lattice constant	a = 559.74(6) pm
Coordination geometry	Tetrahedral (O^{2−}); cubic (Th^{IV})

Thermochemistry
Std molar entropy (S^{⦵}_{298})	65.2(2) J K^{−1} mol^{−1}
Std enthalpy of formation (Δ_{f}H^{⦵}_{298})	−1226(4) kJ/mol

Hazards
- GHS labelling
Pictograms	(GHS06: Toxic) (GHS08: Health hazard)
Signal word	Danger
Hazard statements	H301, H311, H331, H350, H373
Precautionary statements	P203, P260, P264, P270, P271, P280, P301+P316, P302+P352, P304+P340, P316, P318, P319, P321, P330, P361+P364, P403+P233, P405, P501
NFPA 704 (fire diamond)	2 0 0
Flash point	Non-flammable
- Lethal dose or concentration (LD, LC)
LD_{50} (median dose)	400 mg/kg

Related compounds
Other anions	Thorium(IV) sulfide
Other cations	Hafnium(IV) oxide Cerium(IV) oxide
Related compounds	Protactinium(IV) oxide Uranium(IV) oxide
- Except where otherwise noted, data are given for materials in their standard state (at 25 °C [77 °F], 100 kPa). verify (what is ?) Infobox references

Thorium dioxide (ThO_{2}), also called thorium(IV) oxide or thoria, is a crystalline solid, often white or yellow in colour. Thorianite is the name of the mineralogical form of thorium dioxide. It is moderately rare and crystallizes in an isometric system. The melting point of thorium oxide is 3300 °C – the highest of all known oxides. Only a few elements (including tungsten and carbon) and a few compounds (including tantalum carbide) have higher melting points. All thorium compounds, including the dioxide, are radioactive because there are no stable isotopes of thorium.

== Structure and reactions ==
Thorium dioxide exists as two polymorphs. One has a fluorite crystal structure. This is uncommon among binary dioxides. (Other binary oxides with fluorite structure include cerium dioxide, uranium dioxide and plutonium dioxide.) The band gap of thorium dioxide is about 6 eV. A tetragonal form of thorium dioxide is also known.

Thorium dioxide is more stable than thorium monoxide (ThO). Only with careful control of reaction conditions can oxidation of thorium metal give the monoxide rather than the dioxide. At extremely high temperatures, the dioxide can convert to the monoxide either by a disproportionation reaction (equilibrium with liquid thorium metal) above 1,850 K (1,580 °C; 2,870 °F) or by simple dissociation (evolution of oxygen) above 2,500 K (2,230 °C; 4,040 °F).

== Applications ==
=== Nuclear fuels ===
Thorium dioxide can be used in nuclear reactors as ceramic fuel pellets, typically contained in nuclear fuel rods clad with zirconium alloys. Thorium is not fissile (but is "fertile", breeding fissile uranium-233 under neutron bombardment); hence, it must be used as a nuclear reactor fuel in conjunction with fissile isotopes of either uranium or plutonium. This can be achieved by blending thorium with uranium or plutonium, or using it in its pure form in conjunction with separate fuel rods containing uranium or plutonium. Thorium dioxide offers advantages over conventional uranium dioxide fuel pellets, because of its higher thermal conductivity (lower operating temperature), considerably higher melting point, and chemical stability (does not oxidize in the presence of water/oxygen, unlike uranium dioxide).

Thorium dioxide can be turned into a nuclear fuel by breeding it into uranium-233 (see below and refer to the article on thorium for more information on this). The high thermal stability of thorium dioxide allows applications in flame spraying and high-temperature ceramics.

=== Alloys ===
Thorium dioxide is used as a stabilizer in tungsten electrodes in TIG welding, electron tubes, and aircraft gas turbine engines. As an alloy, thoriated tungsten metal is not easily deformed because the high-fusion material thorium dioxide augments the high-temperature mechanical properties, and thorium helps stimulate the emission of electrons (thermions). It is the most popular oxide additive because of its low cost, but is being phased out in favor of non-radioactive elements such as cerium, lanthanum and zirconium.

Thorium dioxide-dispersed nickel finds its applications in various high-temperature operations like combustion engines because it is a good creep-resistant material. It can also be used for hydrogen trapping.

=== Catalysis ===
Thorium dioxide has almost no value as a commercial catalyst, but such applications have been well investigated. It is a catalyst in the Ruzicka large ring synthesis. Other applications that have been explored include petroleum cracking, conversion of ammonia to nitric acid and preparation of sulfuric acid.

=== Radiocontrast agents ===
Thorium dioxide was the primary ingredient in Thorotrast, a once-common radiocontrast agent used for cerebral angiography, however, it causes a rare form of cancer (hepatic angiosarcoma) many years after administration. This use was replaced with injectable iodine or ingestable barium sulfate suspension as standard X-ray contrast agents.

=== Lamp mantles ===
Another major use in the past was in gas mantle of lanterns developed by Carl Auer von Welsbach in 1890, which are composed of 99% ThO_{2} and 1% cerium(IV) oxide. Even as late as the 1980s it was estimated that about half of all ThO_{2} produced (several hundred tonnes per year) was used for this purpose. Some mantles still use thorium, but yttrium oxide (or sometimes zirconium oxide) is used increasingly as a replacement.

=== Glass manufacture ===
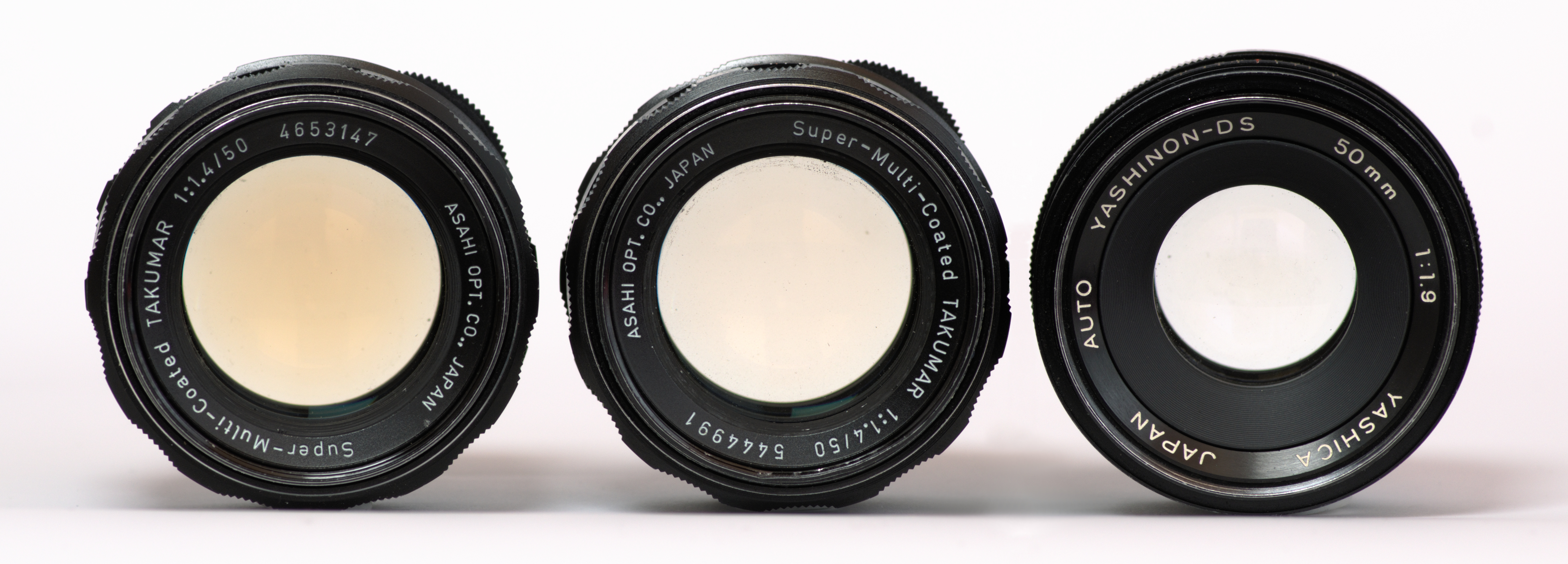
Yellowed thorium dioxide lens (left), a similar lens partially de-yellowed with ultraviolet radiation (centre), and lens without yellowing (right)

When added to glass, thorium dioxide helps increase its refractive index and decrease dispersion. Such glass finds application in high-quality lenses for cameras and scientific instruments. The radiation from these lenses can darken them and turn them yellow over a period of years and degrade film, but the health risks are minimal. Yellowed lenses may be restored to their original colourless state by lengthy exposure to intense ultraviolet radiation. Thorium dioxide has since been replaced by rare-earth oxides such as lanthanum oxide in almost all modern high-index glasses, as they provide similar effects and are not radioactive.

== Cited sources ==
- Haynes, William M., ed. (2011). CRC Handbook of Chemistry and Physics (92nd ed.). CRC Press. ISBN 978-1439855119.
