= Cerium hydroxide =

Cerium hydroxide may refer to:

- Cerium(III) hydroxide, Ce(OH)_{3}, cerium trihydroxide
- Cerium(IV) hydroxide, Ce(OH)_{4}, cerium tetrahydroxide
