= Cerium(IV) hydroxide =

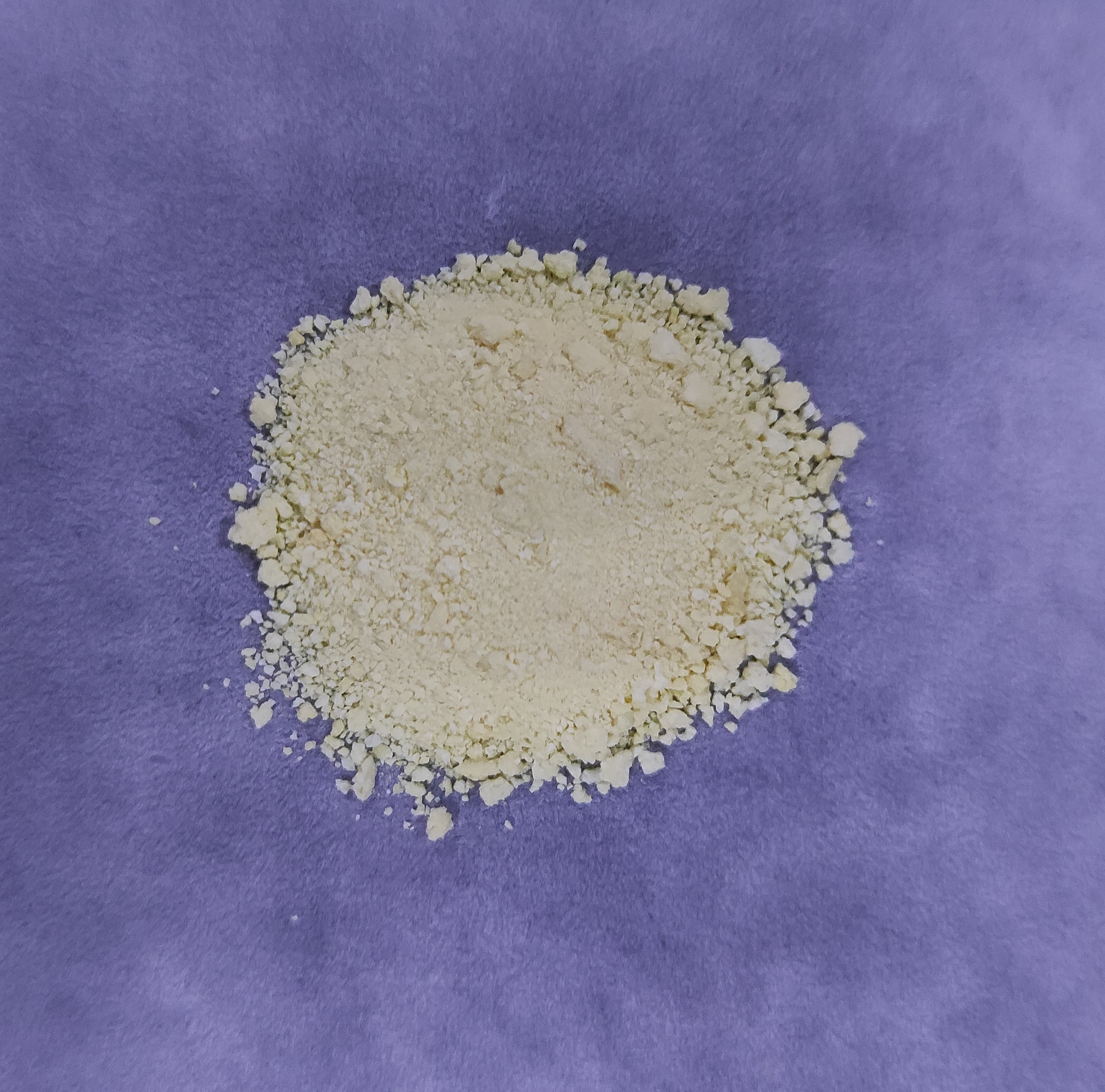

Names
- IUPAC name cerium(4+);tetrahydroxide
- Other names ceric hydroxide

Identifiers
CAS Number	12014-56-1
3D model (JSmol)	Interactive image
ChemSpider	21171175
ECHA InfoCard	100.031.441
EC Number	234-599-7
PubChem CID	10219931
UNII	20GT4M7CWG
CompTox Dashboard (EPA)	DTXSID8065169
- InChI: InChI=1S/Ce.4H2O/h;4*1H2/q+4;;;;/p-4 Key: WTVAYLQYAWAHAX-UHFFFAOYSA-J
- SMILES: [OH-].[OH-].[OH-].[OH-].[Ce+4]

Properties
Chemical formula	Ce(OH)_{4}
Appearance	bright yellow solid

Hazards
- Occupational safety and health (OHS/OSH)
Main hazards	Not classified as hazardous

Related compounds
Other cations	lanthanum hydroxide praseodymium hydroxide
Related compounds	cerium(III) hydroxide cerium dioxide
- Except where otherwise noted, data are given for materials in their standard state (at 25 °C [77 °F], 100 kPa). Infobox references

Cerium(IV) hydroxide, also known as ceric hydroxide, is an inorganic compound with the chemical formula Ce(OH)_{4}. It is a yellowish powder that is insoluble in water but soluble in concentrated acids.

== Production ==
Cerium(IV) hydroxide can be produced by reacting cerium(III) carbonate and acetic acid, then oxidizing it with hydrogen peroxide in base. The reactions are:

Ce_{2}(CO_{3})_{3} + 6 CH_{3}COOH → 2 Ce(CH_{3}COO)_{3} + 3 CO_{2}↑ + 3 H_{2}O
2 Ce(CH_{3}COO)_{3} + 3 H_{2}O_{2} + 4 H_{2}O → 2 Ce(OH)_{3}(OOH) + 6 CH_{3}COOH
CH_{3}COOH + NaOH → CH_{3}COONa + H_{2}O
2 Ce(OH)_{3}(OOH) → 2 Ce(OH)_{4}↓ + O_{2}↑

The net equation is：

Ce_{2}(CO_{3})_{3} + 6 CH_{3}COOH + 3 H_{2}O_{2} + 6 NaOH —^{343 K}→ 2 Ce(OH)_{4} + 6 CH_{3}COONa + O_{2}↑ + 3 CO_{2}↑ + 5 H_{2}O

If using cerium(III) nitrate as ingredient, a similar reaction occurs:

2 Ce(NO_{3})_{3} + 3 H_{2}O_{2} + 6 NH_{3}·H_{2}O → 2 Ce(OH)_{3}(OOH)↓ + 6 NH_{4}NO_{3} + 2 H_{2}O
2 Ce(OH)_{3}(OOH) —^{Δ}→ 2 Ce(OH)_{4}↓ + O_{2}↑

It might also prepared by addition of sodium hydroxide or ammonium hydroxide to a Ce^{4+} solution, being obtained as a gelatinous precipitate described as CeO_{2}·xH_{2}O, (x = 0.5–2). Boiling an insoluble Ce^{4+} salt in NaOH gives granular Ce(OH)_{4}.
