= Cerium =

Cerium, _{58}Ce
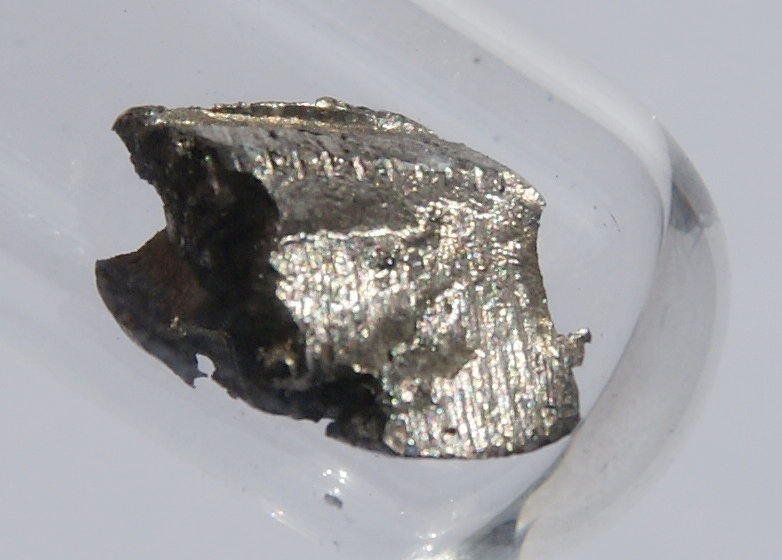

Cerium
- Pronunciation: /ˈsɪəriəm/ (SEER-ee-əm)
- Appearance: silvery white

Standard atomic weight A_{r}°(Ce)
- 140.116±0.001; 140.12±0.01 (abridged)

Cerium in the periodic table
Hydrogen																															Helium
Lithium	Beryllium																									Boron	Carbon	Nitrogen	Oxygen	Fluorine	Neon
Sodium	Magnesium																									Aluminium	Silicon	Phosphorus	Sulfur	Chlorine	Argon
Potassium	Calcium															Scandium	Titanium	Vanadium	Chromium	Manganese	Iron	Cobalt	Nickel	Copper	Zinc	Gallium	Germanium	Arsenic	Selenium	Bromine	Krypton
Rubidium	Strontium															Yttrium	Zirconium	Niobium	Molybdenum	Technetium	Ruthenium	Rhodium	Palladium	Silver	Cadmium	Indium	Tin	Antimony	Tellurium	Iodine	Xenon
Caesium	Barium	Lanthanum	Cerium	Praseodymium	Neodymium	Promethium	Samarium	Europium	Gadolinium	Terbium	Dysprosium	Holmium	Erbium	Thulium	Ytterbium	Lutetium	Hafnium	Tantalum	Tungsten	Rhenium	Osmium	Iridium	Platinum	Gold	Mercury (element)	Thallium	Lead	Bismuth	Polonium	Astatine	Radon
Francium	Radium	Actinium	Thorium	Protactinium	Uranium	Neptunium	Plutonium	Americium	Curium	Berkelium	Californium	Einsteinium	Fermium	Mendelevium	Nobelium	Lawrencium	Rutherfordium	Dubnium	Seaborgium	Bohrium	Hassium	Meitnerium	Darmstadtium	Roentgenium	Copernicium	Nihonium	Flerovium	Moscovium	Livermorium	Tennessine	Oganesson
–
↑
Ce
↓
Th
lanthanum ← cerium → praseodymium
- Atomic number (Z): 58
- Group: f-block groups (no number)
- Period: period 6
- Block: f-block
- Electron configuration: [Xe] 4f^{1} 5d^{1} 6s^{2}
- Electrons per shell: 2, 8, 18, 19, 9, 2

Physical properties
- Phase at STP: solid
- Melting point: 1068 K (795 °C, 1463 °F)
- Boiling point: 3716 K (3443 °C, 6229 °F)
- Density (at 20° C): β-Ce: 6.689 g/cm^{3} γ-Ce: 6.769 g/cm^{3}
- when liquid (at m.p.): 6.55 g/cm^{3}
- Heat of fusion: 5.46 kJ/mol
- Heat of vaporization: 398 kJ/mol
- Molar heat capacity: 26.94 J/(mol·K)
- Specific heat capacity: 192.264 J/(kg·K)
Vapor pressure
P (Pa)	1	10	100	1 k	10 k	100 k
at T (K)	1992	2194	2442	2754	3159	3705

Atomic properties
- Oxidation states: common: +3, +4 +2
- Electronegativity: Pauling scale: 1.12
- Ionization energies: 1st: 534.4 kJ/mol; 2nd: 1050 kJ/mol; 3rd: 1949 kJ/mol; (more)
- Atomic radius: empirical: 181.8 pm
- Covalent radius: 204±9 pm
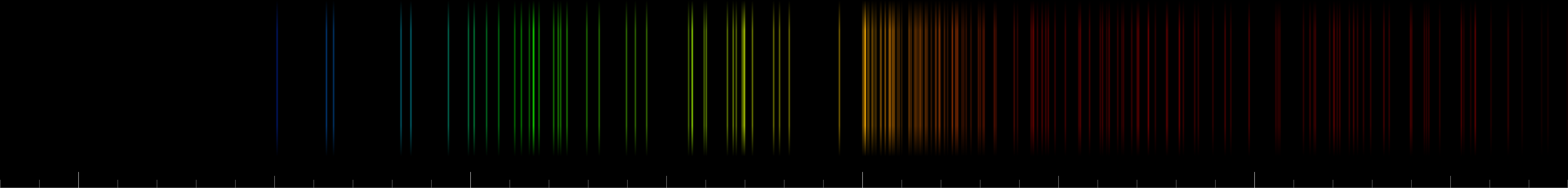
- Spectral lines of cerium

Other properties
- Natural occurrence: primordial
- Crystal structure: β-Ce: double hexagonal close-packed (dhcp) (hP4)
- Lattice constants: a = 0.36811 nm c = 1.1857 nm (at 20 °C)
- Crystal structure: γ-Ce: face-centered cubic (fcc) (cF4)
- Lattice constant: a = 0.51612 nm (at 20 °C)
- Thermal expansion: β-Ce: 6.1×10^{−6}/K γ-Ce: 6.1×10^{−6}/K (at 20 °C)
- Thermal conductivity: 11.3 W/(m⋅K)
- Electrical resistivity: β-Ce, poly: 828 nΩ⋅m (at r.t.)
- Magnetic ordering: paramagnetic
- Molar magnetic susceptibility: β-Ce: +2450.0×10^{−6} cm^{3}/mol (293 K)
- Young's modulus: γ-Ce: 33.6 GPa
- Shear modulus: γ-Ce: 13.5 GPa
- Bulk modulus: γ-Ce: 21.5 GPa
- Speed of sound thin rod: 2100 m/s (at 20 °C)
- Poisson ratio: γ-Ce: 0.24
- Mohs hardness: 2.5
- Vickers hardness: 210–470 MPa
- Brinell hardness: 186–412 MPa
- CAS Number: 7440-45-1

History
- Naming: after dwarf planet Ceres, itself named after Roman deity of agriculture Ceres
- Discovery: Martin Heinrich Klaproth, Wilhelm Hisinger, Jöns Jakob Berzelius (1803)
- First isolation: William Francis Hillebrand (1875)

Isotopes of cerium
Main isotopes			Decay	
Isotope	abundance	half-life (t_{1/2})	mode	product
^{134}Ce	synth	3.16 d	ε	^{134}La
^{136}Ce	0.186%	stable		
^{138}Ce	0.251%	stable		
^{139}Ce	synth	137.64 d	ε	^{139}La
^{140}Ce	88.449%	stable		
^{141}Ce	synth	32.505 d	β^{−}	^{141}Pr
^{142}Ce	11.114%	stable		
^{143}Ce	synth	33.039 h	β^{−}	^{143}Pr
^{144}Ce	synth	284.89 d	β^{−}	^{144}Pr

Cerium is a chemical element; it has symbol Ce and atomic number 58, and is a soft, ductile, and silvery-white metal that tarnishes when exposed to air. Cerium is the second element in the lanthanide series, and while it often shows the oxidation state of +3 characteristic of the series, it also has a stable +4 state that does not oxidize water. It is considered one of the rare-earth elements. Cerium has no known biological role in humans but is not particularly toxic, except with intense or continued exposure.

Despite always occurring in combination with the other rare-earth elements in minerals such as those of the monazite and bastnäsite groups, cerium is easy to extract from its ores, as it can be distinguished among the lanthanides by its unique ability to be oxidized to the +4 state in aqueous solution. It is the most common of the lanthanides, followed by neodymium, lanthanum, and praseodymium. Its estimated abundance in the Earth's crust is 68 ppm.

Cerium was the first of the lanthanides to be discovered, in Bastnäs, Sweden. It was discovered by Jöns Jakob Berzelius and Wilhelm Hisinger in 1803, and independently by Martin Heinrich Klaproth in Germany in the same year. In 1839 Carl Gustaf Mosander separated cerium(III) oxide from other rare earths, and in 1875 William Francis Hillebrand became the first to isolate the metal. Today, cerium and its compounds have a variety of uses: for example, cerium(IV) oxide is used to polish glass and is an important part of catalytic converters. Cerium metal is used in ferrocerium lighters for its pyrophoric properties. Cerium-doped YAG phosphor is used in conjunction with blue light-emitting diodes to produce white light in most commercial white LED light sources.

== Characteristics ==
=== Physical ===
Cerium is the second element of the lanthanide series. In the periodic table, it appears between the lanthanides lanthanum to its left and praseodymium to its right, and above the actinide thorium. It is a ductile metal with a hardness similar to that of silver. Its 58 electrons are arranged in the configuration [Xe]4f^{1}5d^{1}6s^{2}, of which the four outer electrons are valence electrons. The 4f, 5d, and 6s energy levels are very close to each other, and the transfer of one electron to the 5d shell is due to strong interelectronic repulsion in the compact 4f shell. This effect is overwhelmed when the atom is positively ionised; thus Ce^{2+} on its own has instead the regular configuration [Xe]4f^{2}, although in some solid solutions it may be [Xe]4f^{1}5d^{1}. Most lanthanides can use only three electrons as valence electrons, as afterwards the remaining 4f electrons are too strongly bound: cerium is an exception because of the stability of the empty f-shell in Ce^{4+} and the fact that it comes very early in the lanthanide series, where the nuclear charge is still low enough until neodymium to allow the removal of the fourth valence electron by chemical means.

Cerium has a variable electronic structure. The energy of the 4f electron is nearly the same as that of the outer 5d and 6s electrons that are delocalized in the metallic state, and only a small amount of energy is required to change the relative occupancy of these electronic levels. This gives rise to dual valence states. For example, a volume change of about 10% occurs when cerium is subjected to high pressures or low temperatures. In its high pressure phase (α-Cerium), the 4f electrons are also delocalized and itinerant, as opposed to localized 4f electrons in low pressure phase (γ-Cerium). It appears that the valence changes from about 3 to 4 when it is cooled or compressed.

=== Chemical properties of the element ===
Like the other lanthanides, cerium metal is a good reducing agent, having standard reduction potential of E^{~~o~~} = −2.34 V for the Ce^{3+}/Ce couple. It tarnishes in air, forming a passivating oxide layer like iron rust. A centimeter-sized sample of cerium metal corrodes completely in about a year. More dramatically, metallic cerium can be highly pyrophoric:

Ce + O_{2} → CeO_{2}

Being highly electropositive, cerium reacts with water. The reaction is slow with cold water but speeds up with increasing temperature, producing cerium(III) hydroxide and hydrogen gas:

2 Ce + 6 H_{2}O → 2 Ce(OH)_{3} + 3 H_{2}

=== Allotropes ===
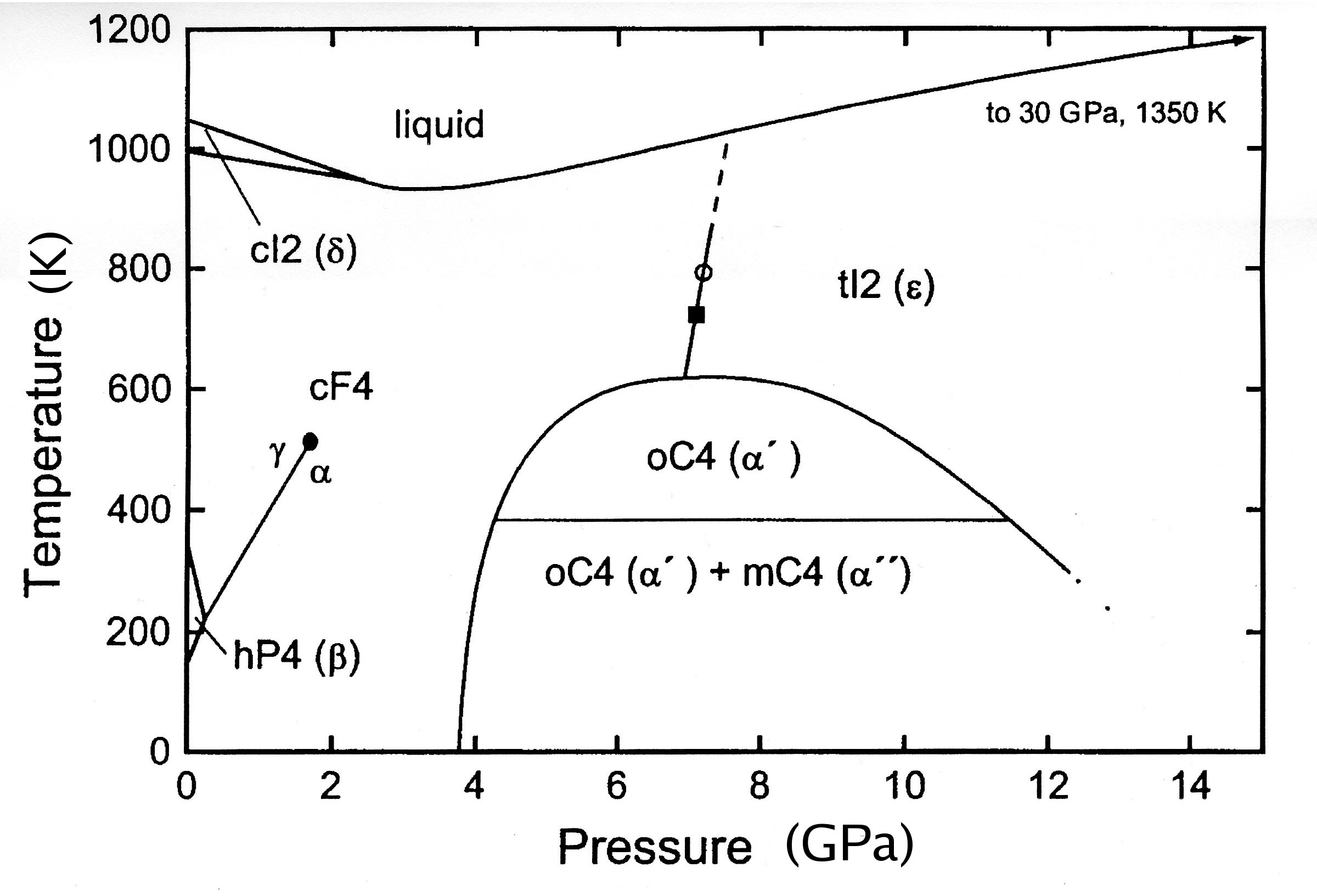
Phase diagram of cerium

Four allotropic forms of cerium are known to exist at standard pressure and are given the common labels of α to δ:

- The high-temperature form, δ-cerium, has a bcc (body-centered cubic) crystal structure and exists above 726 °C.
- The stable form below 726 °C to approximately room temperature is γ-cerium, with an fcc (face-centered cubic) crystal structure.
- The DHCP (double hexagonal close-packed) form β-cerium is the equilibrium structure approximately from room temperature to −150 °C (123 K).
- The fcc form α-cerium is stable below about −150 °C (123 K); it has a density of 8.16 g/cm^{3}.
- Other solid phases occurring only at high pressures are shown on the phase diagram.
- Both γ and β forms are quite stable at room temperature, although the equilibrium transformation temperature is estimated at 75 °C.

At lower temperatures the behavior of cerium is complicated by the slow rates of transformation. Transformation temperatures are subject to substantial hysteresis and values quoted here are approximate. Upon cooling below −15 °C (258 K), γ-cerium starts to change to β-cerium, but the transformation involves a volume increase and, as more β forms, the internal stresses build up and suppress further transformation. Cooling below approximately −160 °C (113 K) will start formation of α-cerium but this is only from remaining γ-cerium. β-cerium does not significantly transform to α-cerium except in the presence of stress or deformation. At atmospheric pressure, liquid cerium is more dense than its solid form at the melting point.

=== Isotopes ===
All nuclear data not otherwise stated is from the standard source:

Naturally occurring cerium is made up of four isotopes: ^{136}Ce (0.19%), ^{138}Ce (0.25%), ^{140}Ce (88.45%), and ^{142}Ce (11.11%). All are observationally stable, though the light isotopes ^{136}Ce and ^{138}Ce are theoretically expected to undergo double electron capture to isotopes of barium, and the heaviest isotope ^{142}Ce is expected to undergo double beta decay to ^{142}Nd or alpha decay to ^{138}Ba. Thus, ^{140}Ce is the only theoretically stable isotope. None of these decay modes have yet been observed, though the double beta decays of ^{136}Ce, ^{138}Ce, and ^{142}Ce have been experimentally searched for. The current experimental limits for their half-lives are about 1×10^{17}, 4×10^{17}, and 3×10^{18} years - all short compared to known double-beta half-lives.

All other cerium isotopes are synthetic and radioactive. The most stable of them are ^{144}Ce with a half-life of 284.9 days, ^{139}Ce with a half-life of 137.6 days, and ^{141}Ce with a half-life of 32.5 days. All other radioactive cerium isotopes have half-lives under four days, and most of them have half-lives under ten minutes. The isotopes between ^{140}Ce and ^{144}Ce inclusive occur as fission products of uranium. The primary decay mode of the isotopes lighter than ^{140}Ce is inverse beta decay or electron capture to isotopes of lanthanum, while that of the heavier isotopes is beta decay to isotopes of praseodymium. Some isotopes of neodymium can alpha decay or are predicted to decay to isotopes of cerium.

== Compounds ==
Cerium exists in two main oxidation states, Ce(III) and Ce(IV). This pair of adjacent oxidation states dominates several aspects of the chemistry of this element. Cerium(IV) aqueous solutions may be prepared by reacting cerium(III) solutions with the strong oxidizing agents peroxodisulfate or bismuthate. The value of E^{~~o~~}(Ce^{4+}/Ce^{3+}) varies widely depending on conditions due to the relative ease of complexation and hydrolysis with various anions, although +1.72 V is representative. Cerium is the only lanthanide which has important aqueous and coordination chemistry in the +4 oxidation state.

=== Halides ===
Cerium forms all four trihalides CeX_{3} (X = F, Cl, Br, I) usually by reaction of the oxides with the hydrogen halides. The anhydrous halides are pale-colored, paramagnetic, hygroscopic solids. Upon hydration, the trihalides convert to complexes containing aquo complexes [Ce(H_{2}O)_{8−9}]^{3+}. Unlike most lanthanides, Ce forms a tetrafluoride, a white solid. It also forms a bronze-colored diiodide, which has metallic properties. Aside from the binary halide phases, a number of anionic halide complexes are known. The fluoride gives the Ce(IV) derivatives CeF_{8}^{4−} and CeF_{6}^{2−}. The chloride gives the orange CeCl_{6}^{2−}.

=== Oxides and chalcogenides ===
Cerium(IV) oxide ("ceria") has the fluorite structure, similarly to the dioxides of praseodymium and terbium. Ceria is a nonstoichiometric compound, meaning that the real formula is CeO_{2−x}, where x is about 0.2. Thus, the material is not perfectly described as Ce(IV). Ceria reduces to cerium(III) oxide with hydrogen gas. Many nonstoichiometric chalcogenides are also known, along with the trivalent Ce_{2}Z_{3} (Z = S, Se, Te). The monochalcogenides CeZ conduct electricity and would better be formulated as Ce^{3+}Z^{2−}e^{−}. While CeZ_{2} are known, they are polychalcogenides with cerium(III): cerium(IV) derivatives of S, Se, and Te are unknown.

=== Cerium(IV) complexes ===
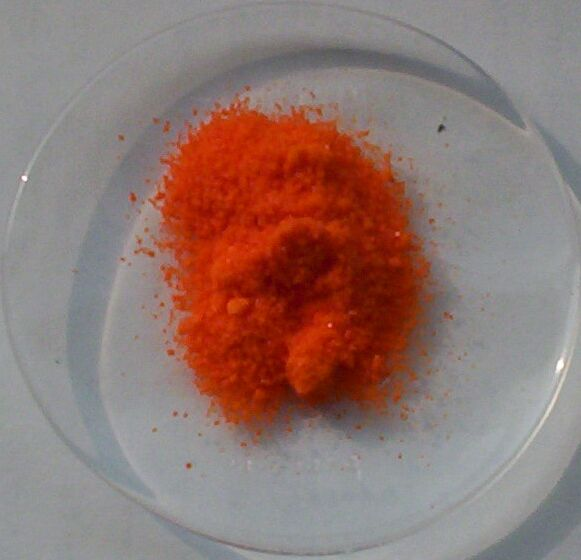
Ceric ammonium nitrate

The compound ceric ammonium nitrate (CAN) (NH_{4})_{2}[Ce(NO_{3})_{6}] is the most common cerium compound encountered in the laboratory. The six nitrate ligands bind as bidentate ligands. The complex [Ce(NO_{3})_{6}]^{2−} is 12-coordinate, a high coordination number which emphasizes the large size of the Ce^{4+} ion. CAN is a popular oxidant in organic synthesis, both as a stoichiometric reagent and as a catalyst. It is inexpensive, stable in air, easily handled, and of low toxicity. It operates by one-electron redox. Cerium nitrates also form 4:3 and 1:1 complexes with 18-crown-6 (the ratio referring to that between the nitrate and the crown ether). Classically, CAN is a primary standard for quantitative analysis. Cerium(IV) salts, especially cerium(IV) sulfate, are often used as standard reagents for volumetric analysis in cerimetric titrations.

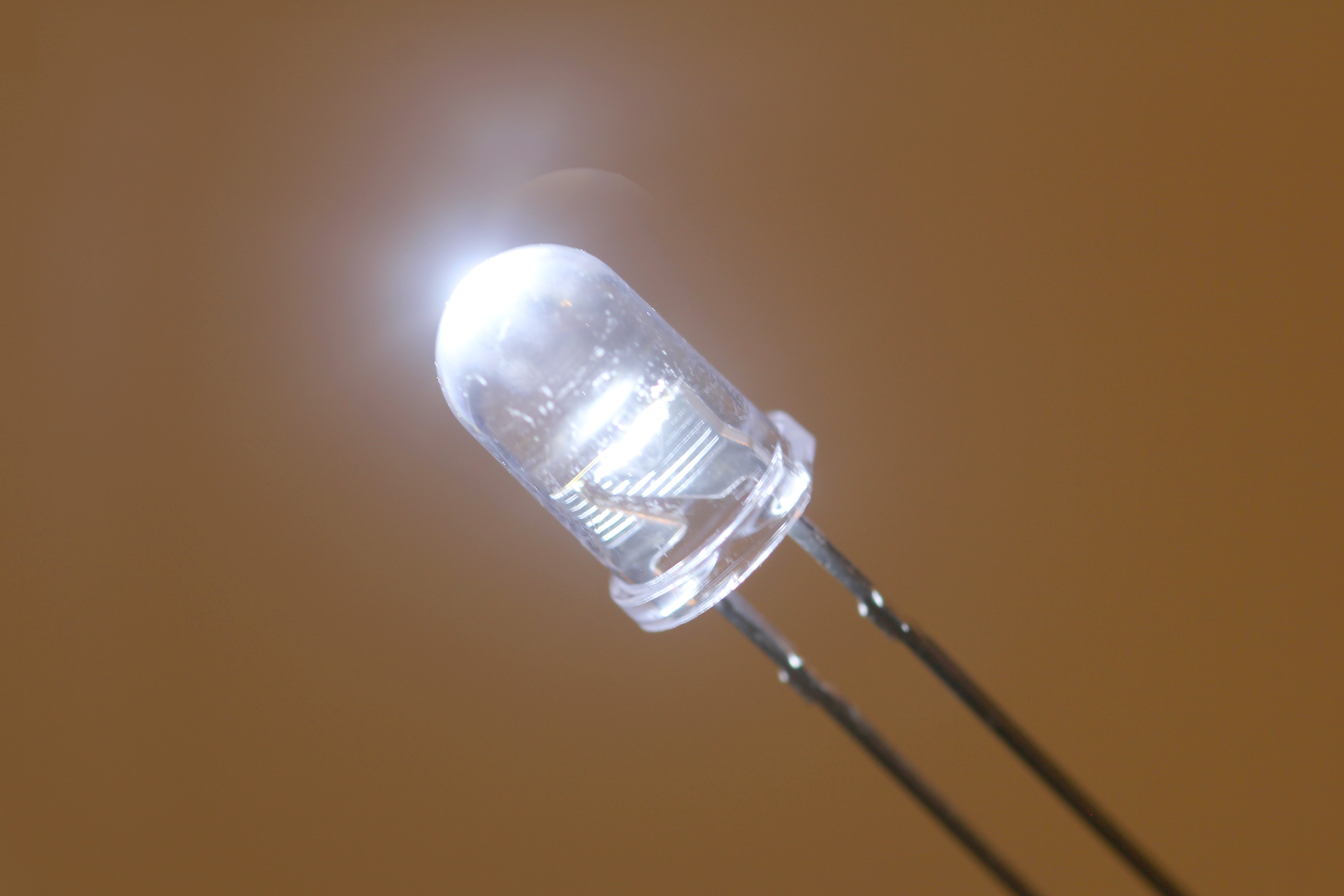
A white LED in operation: the diode produces monochromatic blue light but the Ce:YAG phosphor converts some of it into yellow light; the combination is perceived as white by the human eye.

Due to ligand-to-metal charge transfer, aqueous cerium(IV) ions are orange-yellow. Aqueous cerium(IV) is metastable in water and is a strong oxidizing agent that oxidizes hydrochloric acid to give chlorine gas. In the Belousov–Zhabotinsky reaction, cerium oscillates between the +4 and +3 oxidation states to catalyze the reaction.

=== Organocerium compounds ===
Organocerium chemistry is similar to that of the other lanthanides, often involving complexes of cyclopentadienyl and cyclooctatetraenyl ligands. Cerocene (Ce(C_{8}H_{8})_{2}) adopts the uranocene molecular structure. The 4f electron in cerocene is poised ambiguously between being localized and delocalized and this compound is considered intermediate-valent. Alkyl, alkynyl, and alkenyl organocerium derivatives are prepared from the transmetallation of the respective organolithium or Grignard reagents, and are more nucleophilic but less basic than their precursors.

== History ==
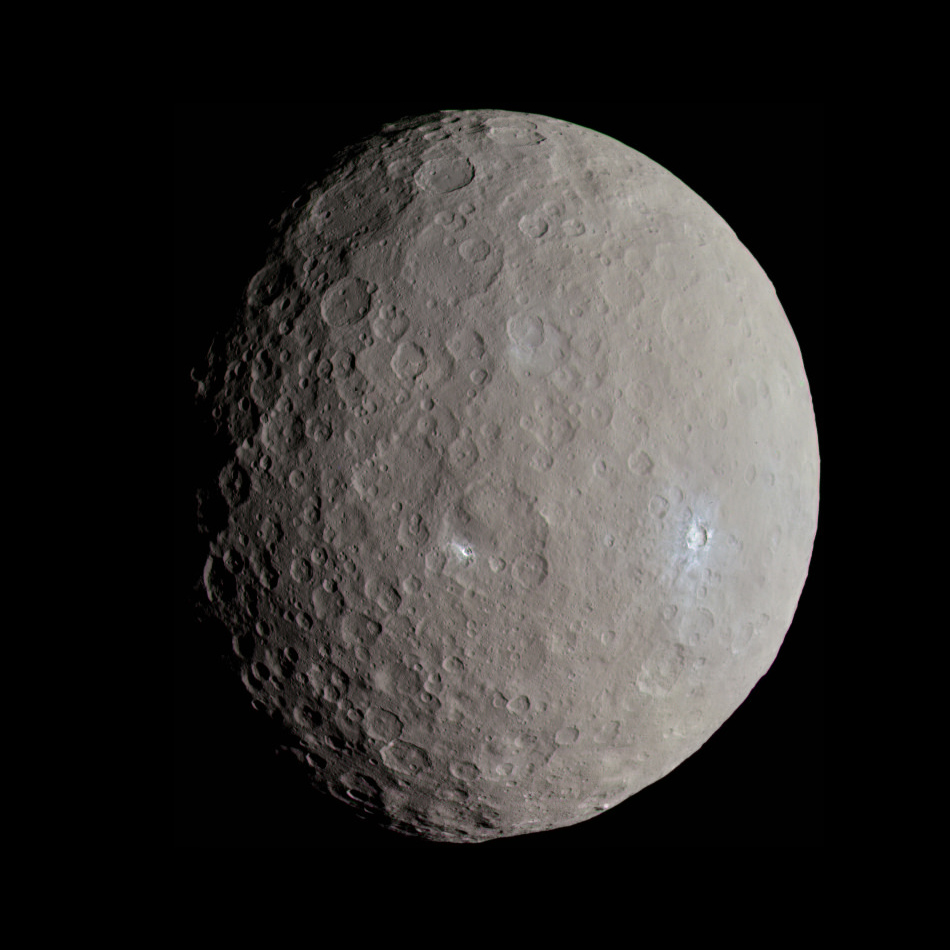
The dwarf planet and asteroid Ceres, after which cerium is named

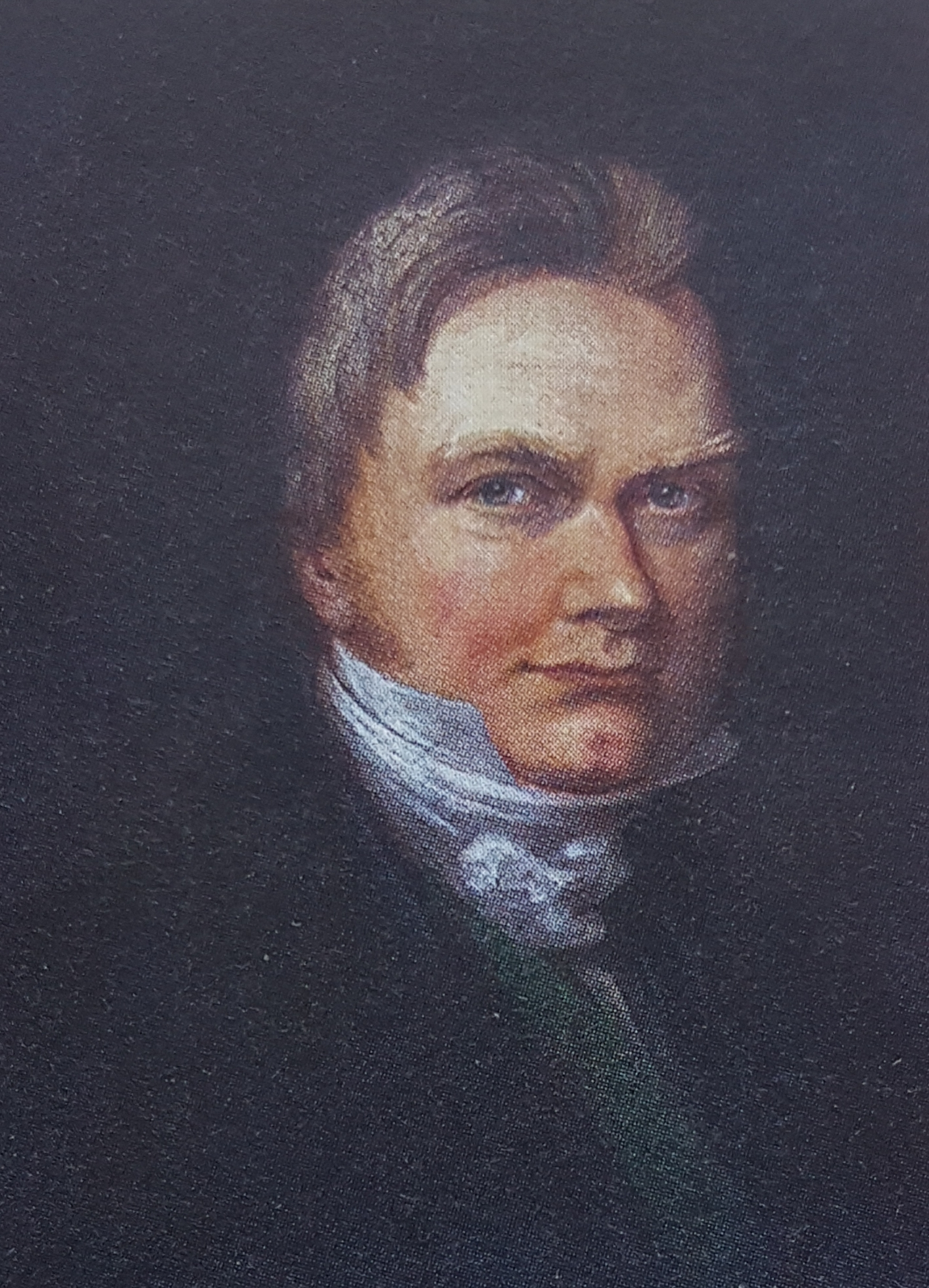
Jöns Jakob Berzelius, one of the discoverers of cerium

Cerium was discovered in Bastnäs in Sweden by Jöns Jakob Berzelius and Wilhelm Hisinger, and independently in Germany by Martin Heinrich Klaproth, both in 1803. Cerium was named by Berzelius after the asteroid Ceres, formally 1 Ceres, discovered two years earlier. Ceres was initially considered to be a planet at the time. The asteroid is itself named after the Roman goddess Ceres, goddess of agriculture, grain crops, fertility and motherly relationships.

Cerium was originally isolated in the form of its oxide, which was named ceria, a term that is still used. The metal itself was too electropositive to be isolated by then-current smelting technology, a characteristic of rare-earth metals in general. After the development of electrochemistry by Humphry Davy five years later, the earths soon yielded the metals they contained. Ceria, as isolated in 1803, contained all of the lanthanides present in the cerite ore from Bastnäs, Sweden, and thus only contained about 45% of what is now known to be pure ceria. It was not until Carl Gustaf Mosander succeeded in removing lanthana and "didymia" in the late 1830s that ceria was obtained pure. Wilhelm Hisinger was a wealthy mine-owner and amateur scientist, and sponsor of Berzelius. He owned and controlled the mine at Bastnäs, and had been trying for years to find out the composition of the abundant heavy gangue rock (the "Tungsten of Bastnäs", which despite its name contained no tungsten), now known as cerite, that he had in his mine. Mosander and his family lived for many years in the same house as Berzelius, and Mosander was undoubtedly persuaded by Berzelius to investigate ceria further.

The element played a role in the Manhattan Project, where cerium compounds were investigated in the Berkeley site as materials for crucibles for uranium and plutonium casting. For this reason, new methods for the preparation and casting of cerium were developed within the scope of the Ames daughter project (now the Ames Laboratory). Production of extremely pure cerium in Ames commenced in mid-1944 and continued until August 1945.

== Occurrence and production ==
Cerium is the most abundant of all the lanthanides and the 25th most abundant element, making up 68 ppm of the Earth's crust. This value is the same of copper, and cerium is even more abundant than common metals such as lead (13 ppm) and tin (2.1 ppm). Thus, despite its position as one of the so-called rare-earth metals, cerium is actually not rare at all. Cerium content in the soil varies between 2 and 150 ppm, with an average of 50 ppm; seawater contains 1.5 parts per trillion of cerium. Cerium occurs in various minerals, but the most important commercial sources are the minerals of the monazite and bastnäsite groups, where it makes up about half of the lanthanide content. Monazite-(Ce) is the most common representative of the monazites, with "-Ce" being the Levinson suffix informing on the dominance of the particular REE element representative. Also the cerium-dominant bastnäsite-(Ce) is the most important of the bastnäsites. Cerium is the easiest lanthanide to extract from its minerals because it is the only one that can reach a stable +4 oxidation state in aqueous solution. Because of the decreased solubility of cerium in the +4 oxidation state, cerium is sometimes depleted from rocks relative to the other rare-earth elements and is incorporated into zircon, since Ce^{4+} and Zr^{4+} have the same charge and similar ionic radii. In extreme cases, cerium(IV) can form its own minerals separated from the other rare-earth elements, such as cerianite-(Ce) and (Ce,Th)O_{2}.

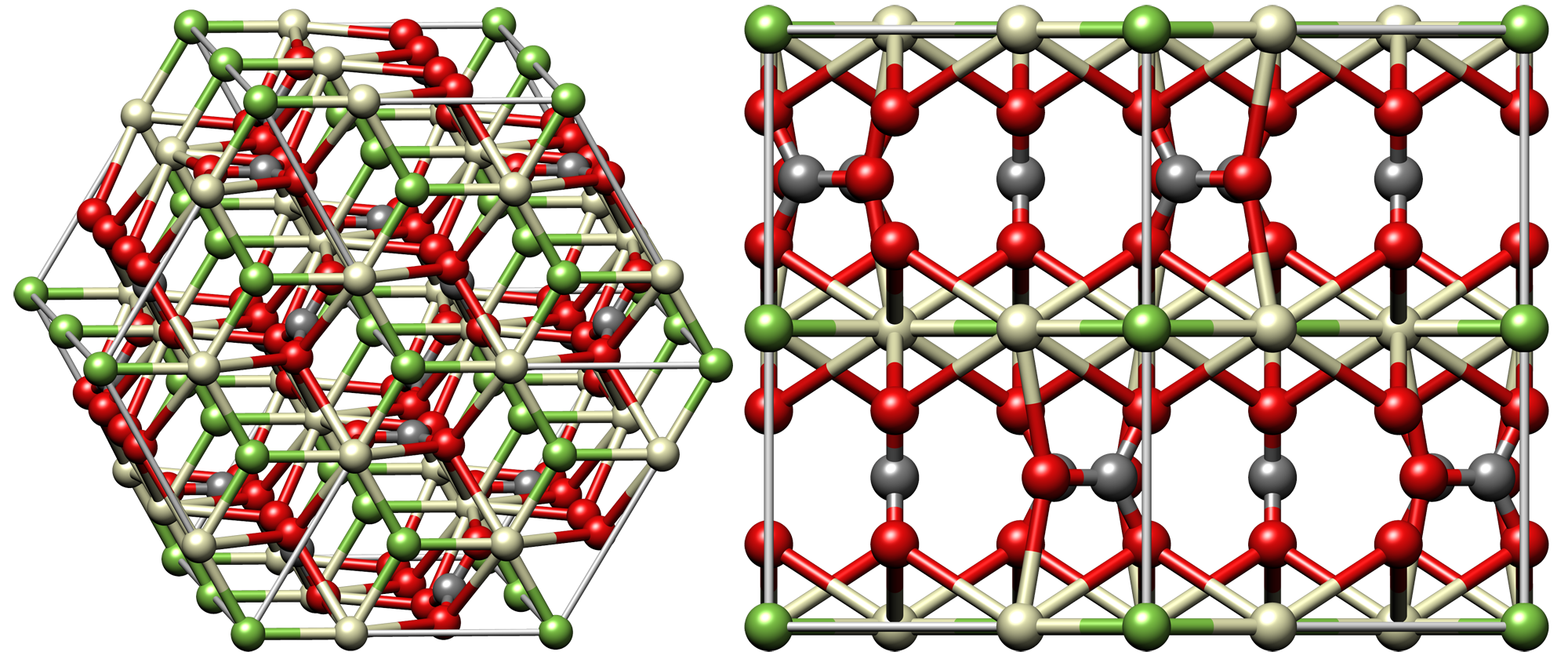
Crystal structure of bastnäsite-(Ce). Color code: carbon, C, blue-gray; fluorine, F, green; cerium, Ce, white; oxygen, O, red.

Bastnäsite, Ln^{III}CO_{3}F, is usually lacking in thorium and the heavy lanthanides beyond samarium and europium, and hence the extraction of cerium from it is quite direct. First, the bastnäsite is purified, using dilute hydrochloric acid to remove calcium carbonate impurities. The ore is then roasted in the air to oxidize it to the lanthanide oxides: while most of the lanthanides will be oxidized to the sesquioxides Ln_{2}O_{3}, cerium will be oxidized to the dioxide CeO_{2}. This is insoluble in water and can be leached out with 0.5 M hydrochloric acid, leaving the other lanthanides behind.

The procedure for monazite, (Ln,Th)PO_{4}, which usually contains all the rare earths, as well as thorium, is more involved. Monazite, because of its magnetic properties, can be separated by repeated electromagnetic separation. After separation, it is treated with hot concentrated sulfuric acid to produce water-soluble sulfates of rare earths. The acidic filtrates are partially neutralized with sodium hydroxide to pH 3–4. Thorium precipitates out of solution as hydroxide and is removed. After that, the solution is treated with ammonium oxalate to convert rare earths to their insoluble oxalates. The oxalates are converted to oxides by annealing. The oxides are dissolved in nitric acid, but cerium oxide is insoluble in HNO_{3} and hence precipitates out. Care must be taken when handling some of the residues as they contain ^{228}Ra, the daughter of ^{232}Th, which is a strong gamma emitter.

== Applications ==
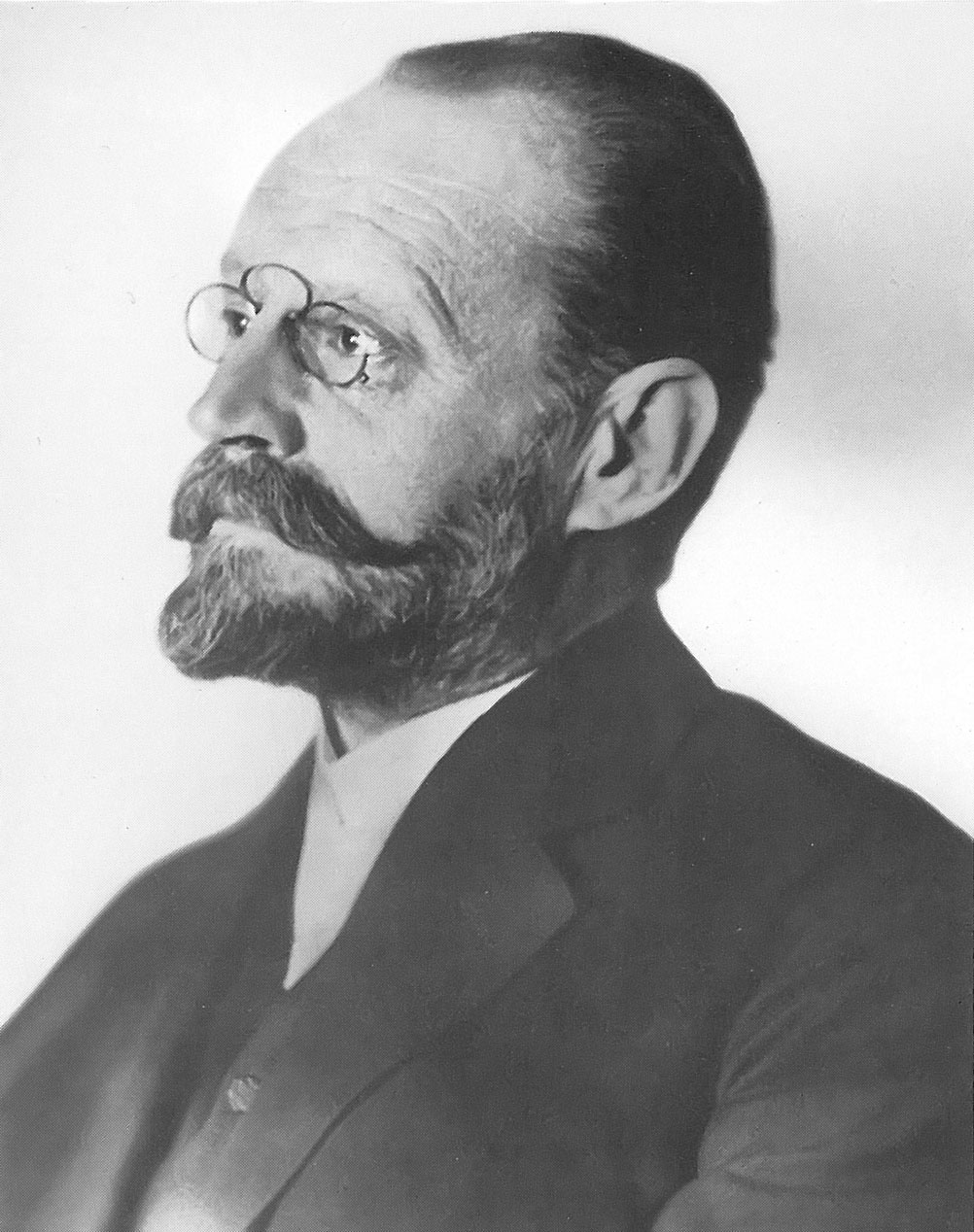
Carl Auer von Welsbach, who discovered many applications of cerium

Cerium has two main applications, both of which use CeO_{2}. The industrial application of ceria is for polishing, especially chemical-mechanical planarization (CMP). In its other main application, CeO_{2} is used to decolorize glass. It functions by converting green-tinted ferrous impurities to nearly colorless ferric oxides. Ceria has also been used as a substitute for its radioactive congener thoria, for example in the manufacture of electrodes used in gas tungsten arc welding, where cerium as an alloying element improves arc stability and ease of starting while decreasing burn-off.

=== Gas mantles and pyrophoric alloys ===
The first use of cerium was in gas mantles, invented by Austrian chemist Carl Auer von Welsbach. In 1885, he had previously experimented with mixtures of magnesium, lanthanum, and yttrium oxides, but these gave green-tinted light and were unsuccessful. Six years later, he discovered that pure thorium oxide produced a much better, though blue, light, and that mixing it with cerium dioxide resulted in a bright white light. Cerium dioxide also acts as a catalyst for the combustion of thorium oxide.

This resulted in commercial success for von Welsbach and his invention, and created great demand for thorium. Its production resulted in a large amount of lanthanides being simultaneously extracted as by-products. Applications were soon found for them, especially in the pyrophoric alloy known as "mischmetal" composed of 50% cerium, 25% lanthanum, and the remainder being the other lanthanides, that is used widely for lighter flints. Usually iron is added to form the alloy ferrocerium, also invented by von Welsbach. Due to the chemical similarities of the lanthanides, chemical separation is not usually required for their applications, such as the addition of mischmetal to steel as an inclusion modifier to improve mechanical properties, or as catalysts for the cracking of petroleum. This property of cerium saved the life of writer Primo Levi at the Auschwitz concentration camp, when he found a supply of ferrocerium alloy and bartered it for food.

=== Pigments and phosphors ===
The photostability of pigments can be enhanced by the addition of cerium, as it provides pigments with lightfastness and prevents clear polymers from darkening in sunlight. An example of a cerium compound used on its own as an inorganic pigment is the vivid red cerium(III) sulfide (cerium sulfide red), which stays chemically inert up to very high temperatures. The pigment is a safer alternative to lightfast but toxic cadmium selenide-based pigments. The addition of cerium oxide to older cathode-ray tube television glass plates was beneficial, as it suppresses the darkening effect from the creation of F-center defects due to the continuous electron bombardment during operation. Cerium is also an essential component as a dopant for phosphors used in CRT TV screens, fluorescent lamps, and later white light-emitting diodes. The most commonly used example is cerium(III)-doped yttrium aluminium garnet (Ce:YAG) which emits yellow light (530–540 nm) and also behaves as a scintillator.

=== Other uses ===
Cerium salts, such as the sulfides Ce_{2}S_{3} and Ce_{3}S_{4}, were considered during the Manhattan Project as advanced refractory materials for the construction of crucibles which could withstand the high temperatures and strongly reducing conditions when casting plutonium metal. Despite desirable properties, these sulfides were never widely adopted due to practical issues with their synthesis. Cerium is used as alloying element in aluminium to create castable eutectic aluminium alloys with 6–16 wt.% Ce, to which other elements such as Mg, Ni, Fe and Mn can be added. These Al-Ce alloys have excellent high temperature strength and are suitable for automotive applications (e.g. in cylinder heads). Other alloys of cerium include Pu-Ce and Pu-Ce-Co plutonium alloys, which have been used as nuclear fuel.

Cerium oxide can be used in catalytic converters to increase the efficiency of oxidation of CO and NO_{x} emissions during low-oxygen conditions in the exhaust gases from motor vehicles.

== Biological role and precautions ==
Cerium
Hazards
- GHS labelling
Pictograms	(GHS02: Flammable)
Signal word	Danger
Hazard statements	H228
Precautionary statements	P210
NFPA 704 (fire diamond)	2 0 0

The early lanthanides have been found to be essential to some methanotrophic bacteria living in volcanic mudpots, such as Methylacidiphilum fumariolicum: lanthanum, cerium, praseodymium, and neodymium are about equally effective. Cerium is otherwise not known to have biological role in any other organisms, but is not very toxic either; it does not accumulate in the food chain to any appreciable extent. Because it often occurs together with calcium in phosphate minerals, and bones are primarily calcium phosphate, cerium can accumulate in bones in small amounts that are not considered dangerous.

Cerium nitrate is an effective topical antimicrobial treatment for third-degree burns, although large doses can lead to cerium poisoning and methemoglobinemia. Like all rare-earth metals, cerium is of low to moderate toxicity. A strong reducing agent, it ignites spontaneously in air at 65 to 80 °C. Fumes from cerium fires are toxic. Cerium reacts with water to produce hydrogen gas, and thus cerium fires can only be effectively extinguished using class D dry powder extinguishing media. Workers exposed to cerium have experienced itching, sensitivity to heat, and skin lesions. Cerium is not toxic when eaten, but animals injected with large doses of cerium have died due to cardiovascular collapse. Cerium is more dangerous to aquatic organisms because it damages cell membranes; it is not very soluble in water and can cause environmental contamination.

Cerium oxide, the most prevalent cerium compound in industrial applications, is not regulated in the United States by the Occupational Safety and Health Administration (OSHA) as a hazardous substance. In Russia, its occupational exposure limit is 5 mg/m^{3}. Elemental cerium has no established occupational or permissible exposure limits by the OSHA or American Conference of Governmental Industrial Hygienists, though it is classified as a flammable solid and regulated as such under the Globally Harmonized System of Classification and Labelling of Chemicals. Toxicological reports on cerium compounds have noted their cytotoxicity and contributions to pulmonary interstitial fibrosis in workers.

== Bibliography ==
- Greenwood, Norman N.; Earnshaw, Alan (1997). Chemistry of the Elements (2nd ed.). Butterworth-Heinemann. doi:10.1016/C2009-0-30414-6. ISBN 978-0-08-037941-8.
