= Tris(cyclopentadienyl)cerium =

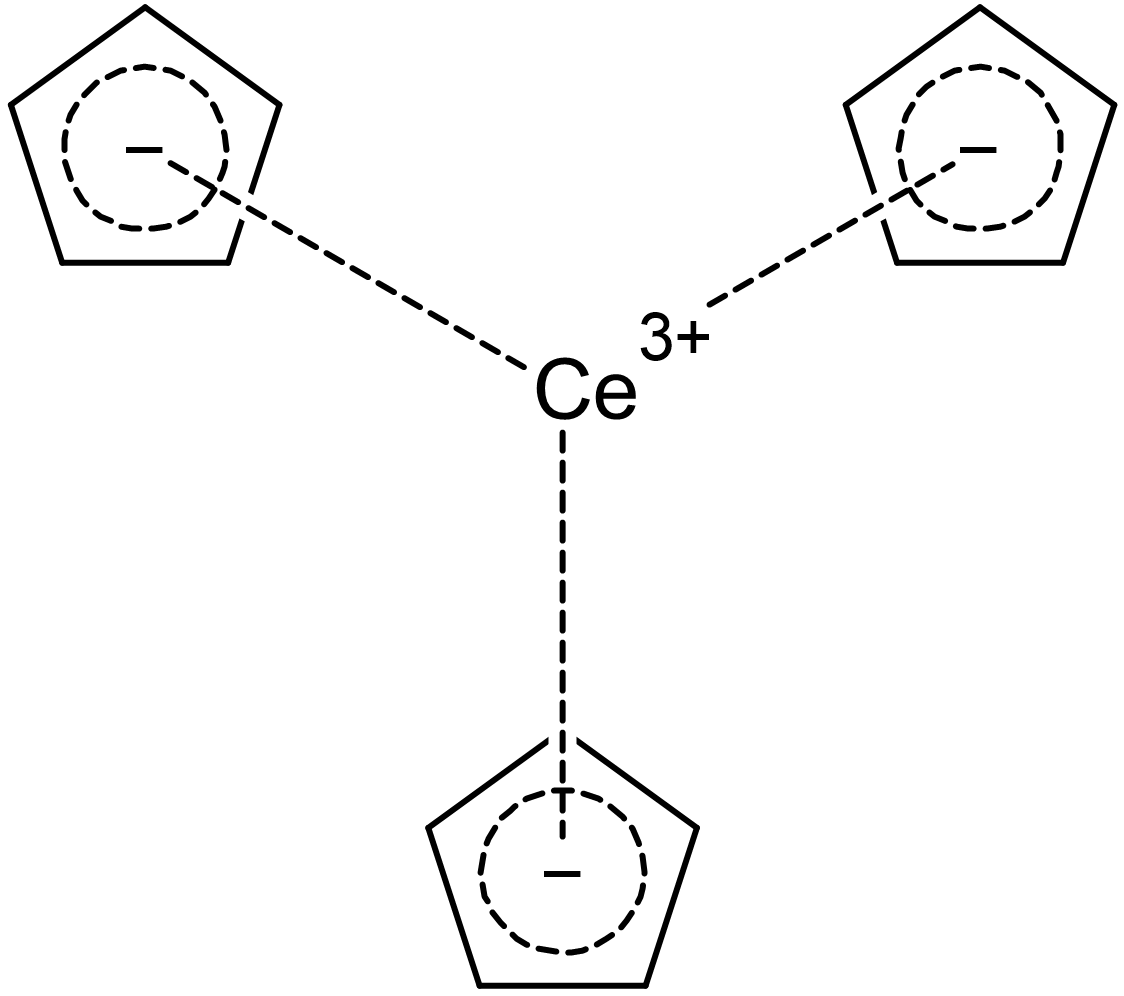

Names
- Other names Cerium cyclopentadienide

Identifiers
CAS Number	1298-53-9
3D model (JSmol)	Interactive image
ChemSpider	92235
EC Number	215-073-6
PubChem CID	16052392
CompTox Dashboard (EPA)	DTXSID60926499
- InChI: InChI=1S/3C5H5.Ce/c3*1-2-4-5-3-1;/h3*1-5H;/q3*-1;+3 Key: KDGBXTFCUISDFL-UHFFFAOYSA-N
- SMILES: c1ccc[cH-]1.c2ccc[cH-]2.c3ccc[cH-]3.[Ce+3]

Properties
Chemical formula	Ce(C_{5}H_{5})_{3}
Molar mass	335.401
Appearance	orange-red solid
Melting point	435 °C (Decomposes slightly when melted)
Boiling point	230 °C (10^{−3}~10^{−4}mmHg, sublimates)
- Except where otherwise noted, data are given for materials in their standard state (at 25 °C [77 °F], 100 kPa). Infobox references

Tris(cyclopentadienyl)cerium is a metal organic compound of cerium with the chemical formula Ce(C_{5}H_{5})_{3}. It and the other cyclopentadiene compounds of the lanthanide metals are different from the cyclopentadienyl complexes of general transition metals and is considered to be ionically bonded.

== Preparation ==
Tris(cyclopentadienyl)cerium can be obtained by reacting anhydrous cerium chloride and sodium cyclopentadienide in a tetrahydrofuran medium:

3C_{5}H_{5}Na + CeCl_{3} → (C_{5}H_{5})_{3}Ce+ 3 NaCl

== Chemical properties ==
Tris(cyclopentadienyl)cerium decomposes when exposed to water to produce cerium(III) hydroxide and cyclopentadiene.

== Related compounds ==
There are literature reports on the synthesis and properties of the tetravalent cerium compound Ce(C_{5}H_{5})_{4}, but it has been pointed out that the synthesis method is not credible.
