= Thorium(IV) sulfide =

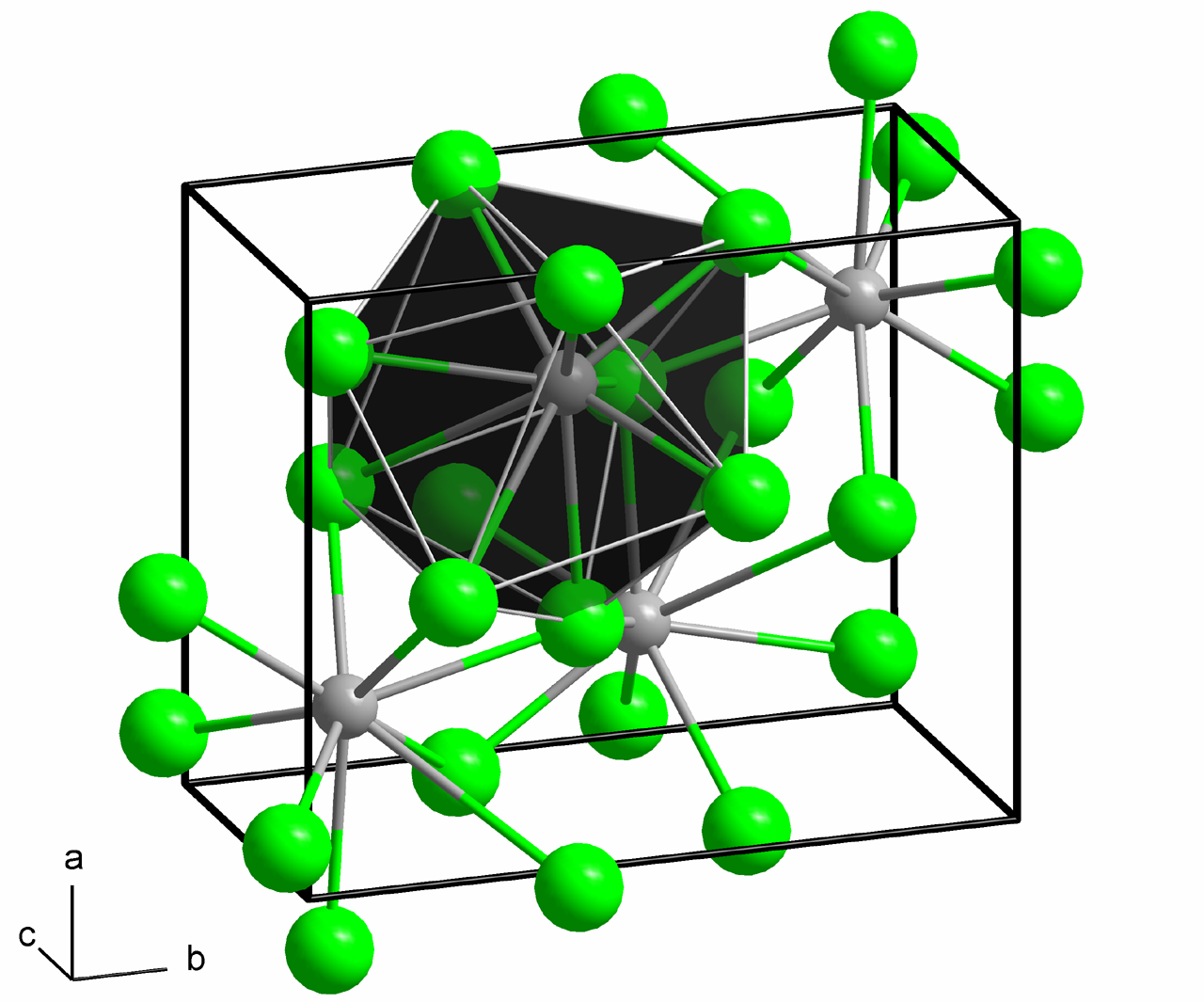
- Thorium(IV) sulfide

Identifiers
CAS Number	12138-07-7
3D model (JSmol)	Interactive image
ChemSpider	23349363
ECHA InfoCard	100.032.026
EC Number	235-242-8
PubChem CID	82937
CompTox Dashboard (EPA)	DTXSID7065255
- InChI: InChI=1S/2S.Th
- SMILES: [Th+4].[S-2].[S-2]

Properties
Chemical formula	ThS_{2}
Molar mass	296.17 g/mol
Appearance	dark brown crystals
Density	7.3 g/cm^{3}, solid
Melting point	1,905 °C (3,461 °F; 2,178 K)

Structure
Crystal structure	PbCl_{2} type (orthorhombic)
Space group	Pnma (No. 62)
Formula units (Z)	4
- Except where otherwise noted, data are given for materials in their standard state (at 25 °C [77 °F], 100 kPa). verify (what is ?) Infobox references

Thorium(IV) sulfide (ThS_{2}) is an inorganic chemical compound composed of one thorium atom ionically bonded to two atoms of sulfur. This salt is dark brown and has a melting point of 1905 °C. ThS_{2} adopts the same orthorhombic lattice structure as PbCl_{2}.
