= Ammonium oxalate =

Names
- IUPAC name Ammonium oxalate
- Systematic IUPAC name Ammonium ethanedioate
- Other names Diammonium oxalate

Identifiers
CAS Number	1113-38-8; 6009-70-7 (monohydrate)
3D model (JSmol)	Interactive image
ChEBI	CHEBI:91241
ChemSpider	13577
ECHA InfoCard	100.012.912
PubChem CID	14213
UNII	0PB8MO5U0H; L4MP14OB48 (monohydrate)
CompTox Dashboard (EPA)	DTXSID50889443
- InChI: InChI=1S/C2H2O4.2H3N/c3-1(4)2(5)6;;/h(H,3,4)(H,5,6);2*1H3 Key: VBIXEXWLHSRNKB-UHFFFAOYSA-N; InChI=1S/C2H2O4.2H3N/c3-1(4)2(5)6;;/h(H,3,4)(H,5,6);2*1H3
- SMILES: [O-]C(=O)C([O-])=O.[NH4+].[NH4+]

Properties
Chemical formula	[NH_{4}]_{2}C_{2}O_{4}
Molar mass	124.096 g·mol^{−1}
Appearance	Colorless or white crystalline solid
Density	1.5 g/cm^{3}
Melting point	70 C (158 F, 343.15 K)
Solubility in water	5.20 g/(100 ml) (25 °C)

Hazards
- GHS labelling
Hazard statements	H302, H312, H319
- Except where otherwise noted, data are given for materials in their standard state (at 25 °C [77 °F], 100 kPa). verify (what is ?) Infobox references

Ammonium oxalate is a chemical compound with the chemical formula [NH_{4}]_{2}C_{2}O_{4}. Its formula is often written as (NH_{4})_{2}C_{2}O_{4} or (COONH_{4})_{2}. It is an ammonium salt of oxalic acid. It consists of ammonium cations ([NH_{4}]^{+}) and oxalate anions (C_{2}O^{2−}_{4}). The structure of ammonium oxalate is ([NH_{4}]^{+})_{2}[C_{2}O_{4}]^{2−}. Ammonium oxalate sometimes comes as a monohydrate ([NH_{4}]_{2}C_{2}O_{4}·H_{2}O). It is a colorless or white salt under standard conditions and is odorless and non-volatile. It occurs in many plants and vegetables.

== Vertebrate ==
It is produced in the body of vertebrates by metabolism of glyoxylic acid or ascorbic acid. It is not metabolized but excreted in the urine. It is a constituent of some types of kidney stone. It is also found in guano.

== Mineralogy ==
Oxammite is a natural mineral form of ammonium oxalate. This mineral is extremely rare. It is an organic mineral derived from guano.

== Chemistry ==
Ammonium oxalate is used as an analytical reagent and general reducing agent. It and other oxalates are used as anticoagulants, to preserve blood outside the body.

=== Earth sciences ===
Acid ammonium oxalate (ammonium oxalate acidified to pH 3 with oxalic acid) is commonly employed in soil chemical analysis to extract iron and aluminium from poorly-crystalline minerals (such as ferrihydrite), iron(II)-bearing minerals (such as magnetite) and organic matter.
