= Dyrnaesite-(La) =

Rare earth phosphate mineral

General
- Category: Phosphate mineral
- Formula: Na_{8}Ce^{4+}(La,REE)_{2}(PO_{4})_{6}
- IMA symbol: Dyr-La
- Crystal system: Orthorhombic
- Crystal class: Dipyramidal (mmm); H-M symbol: (2/m 2/m 2/m)
- Space group: Pnma
- Unit cell: a = 18.466, b = 16.011 c = 7.027 [Å] (approximated); Z = 4

Identification

Dyrnaesite-(La) is a rare-earth phosphate mineral with the formula Na_{8}Ce^{4+}(La,REE)_{2}(PO_{4})_{6}. Dyrnaesite-(La) is related to vitusite-(Ce), another rare-earth phosphate mineral. It comes from lujavrite, a type of alkaline syenite rock, of South Greenland. Dyrnaesite-(La) is one of few known minerals with essential tetravalent cerium, the other two being cerianite-(Ce) and stetindite.
