= Cerium(III) oxide =

- Cerium(III) oxide

Names
- IUPAC name Cerium(III) oxide
- Other names Cerium sesquioxide

Identifiers
CAS Number	1345-13-7
3D model (JSmol)	Interactive image
ChemSpider	8081132
ECHA InfoCard	100.014.289
EC Number	234-374-3
PubChem CID	9905479
UNII	82Q2098IFG
CompTox Dashboard (EPA)	DTXSID60149580
- InChI: InChI=1S/2Ce.3O/q2*+3;3*-2 Key: DRVWBEJJZZTIGJ-UHFFFAOYSA-N
- SMILES: [O-2].[O-2].[O-2].[Ce+3].[Ce+3]

Properties
Chemical formula	Ce_{2}O_{3}
Molar mass	328.229 g·mol^{−1}
Appearance	yellow-green dust
Density	6.2 g/cm^{3}
Melting point	2,177 °C (3,951 °F; 2,450 K)
Boiling point	3,730 °C (6,750 °F; 4,000 K)
Solubility in water	insoluble
Solubility in sulfuric acid	soluble
Solubility in hydrochloric acid	insoluble

Structure
Crystal structure	Hexagonal, hP5
Space group	P3̅m1, No. 164

Hazards
- GHS labelling
Pictograms	(GHS07: Exclamation mark) (GHS09: Environmental hazard)

Related compounds
Other anions	Cerium(III) chloride
Other cations	Lanthanum(III) oxide, Praseodymium(III) oxide
Related compounds	Cerium(IV) oxide
- Except where otherwise noted, data are given for materials in their standard state (at 25 °C [77 °F], 100 kPa). verify (what is ?) Infobox references

Cerium(III) oxide, also known as cerium oxide, cerium trioxide, cerium sesquioxide, cerous oxide or dicerium trioxide, is an oxide of the rare-earth metal cerium. It has chemical formula Ce_{2}O_{3} and is gold-yellow in color. According to X-ray crystallography, the Ce(III) ions are seven-coordinate, a motif typical for other trivalent lanthanide oxides.

== Applications ==
Cerium oxide is of commercial interest as a catalyst for oxidation of carbon monoxide and reduction of NO_{x}. These applications exploit the facility of the Ce(III)/Ce(IV) redox couple. It is used in catalytic converters ("three-way catalytic converter") for the minimisation of CO emissions in the exhaust gases from motor vehicles. When there is a shortage of oxygen, cerium(IV) oxide oxidizes carbon monoxide to the benign dioxide:

2 CeO_{2} + CO → Ce_{2}O_{3} + CO_{2}

When oxygen is in surplus, the process is reversed and cerium(III) oxide is oxidized to cerium(IV) oxide:

2 Ce_{2}O_{3} + O_{2} → 4 CeO_{2}

Cerium oxide-based catalysts have been intensively investigated for selective catalytic reduction (SCR) of NO_{x}. Such technologies, which tend to use vanadium oxide-based catalysts rather than ceria, are associated with power plants, foundries, cement factories and other energy-intensive facilities.

Cerium oxide finds use as a fuel additive to diesel fuels, which results in increased fuel efficiency and decreased hydrocarbon derived particulate matter emissions, however the health effects of the cerium oxide bearing engine exhaust is a point of study and dispute.

== Other properties ==
=== Water splitting ===
The cerium(IV) oxide–cerium(III) oxide cycle or CeO_{2}/Ce_{2}O_{3} cycle is a two step thermochemical water splitting process based on cerium(IV) oxide and cerium(III) oxide for hydrogen production.

=== Photoluminescence ===
Cerium(III) oxide combined with tin(II) oxide (SnO) in ceramic form is used for illumination with UV light. It absorbs light with a wavelength of 320 nm and emits light with a wavelength of 412 nm. This combination of cerium(III) oxide and tin(II) oxide is rare, and obtained only with difficulty on a laboratory scale.

== Production ==
Cerium(III) oxide is produced by the reduction of cerium(IV) oxide with hydrogen at approximately 1,400 °C (2,550 °F). Samples produced in this way are only slowly air-oxidized back to the dioxide at room temperature.
