= Cerium nitrates =

Cerium(III) nitrate
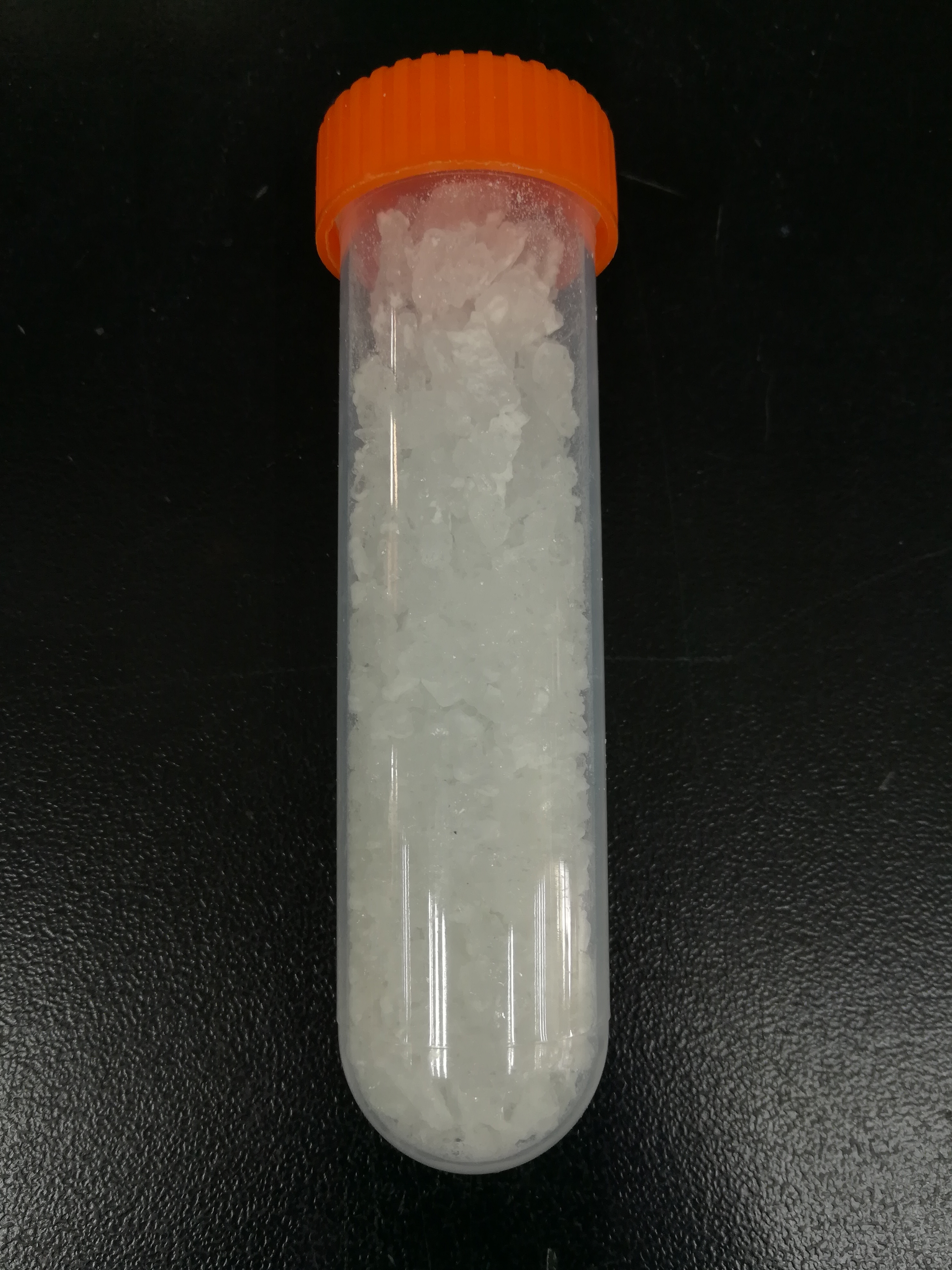

Identifiers
CAS Number	(anhydrous): 10108-73-3; (hexahydrate): 10294-41-4
3D model (JSmol)	(anhydrous): Interactive image; (hexahydrate): Interactive image
ChemSpider	(anhydrous): 23322; (hexahydrate): 14799128
ECHA InfoCard	100.030.257
EC Number	(anhydrous): 233-297-2; (hexahydrate): 600-370-9
PubChem CID	(anhydrous): 24948; (hexahydrate): 16211466
UNII	(anhydrous): 7U25VKD7PW; (hexahydrate): FL1R38JEBB
CompTox Dashboard (EPA)	(anhydrous): DTXSID20881414; (hexahydrate): DTXSID701015566
- InChI: (anhydrous): InChI=1S/Ce.3NO3/c;3*2-1(3)4/q+3;3*-1 Key: HSJPMRKMPBAUAU-UHFFFAOYSA-N; (hexahydrate): InChI=1S/Ce.3NO3.6H2O/c;3*2-1(3)4;;;;;;/h;;;;6*1H2/q+3;3*-1;;;;;; Key: QQZMWMKOWKGPQY-UHFFFAOYSA-N
- SMILES: (anhydrous): [N+](=O)([O-])[O-].[N+](=O)([O-])[O-].[N+](=O)([O-])[O-].[Ce+3]; (hexahydrate): [N+](=O)([O-])[O-].[N+](=O)([O-])[O-].[N+](=O)([O-])[O-].O.O.O.O.O.O.[Ce+3]

Properties
Chemical formula	Ce(NO_{3})_{3}
Molar mass	326.12 g/mol
Appearance	Colorless crystals (hexahydrate)
Density	2.38 g⋅cm^{−3}
- Except where otherwise noted, data are given for materials in their standard state (at 25 °C [77 °F], 100 kPa). Infobox references

Cerium nitrate refers to a family of nitrates of cerium in the +3 or +4 oxidation state. Often these compounds contain water, hydroxide, or hydronium ions in addition to cerium and nitrate. Double nitrates of cerium also exist.

== Cerium(III) nitrates ==
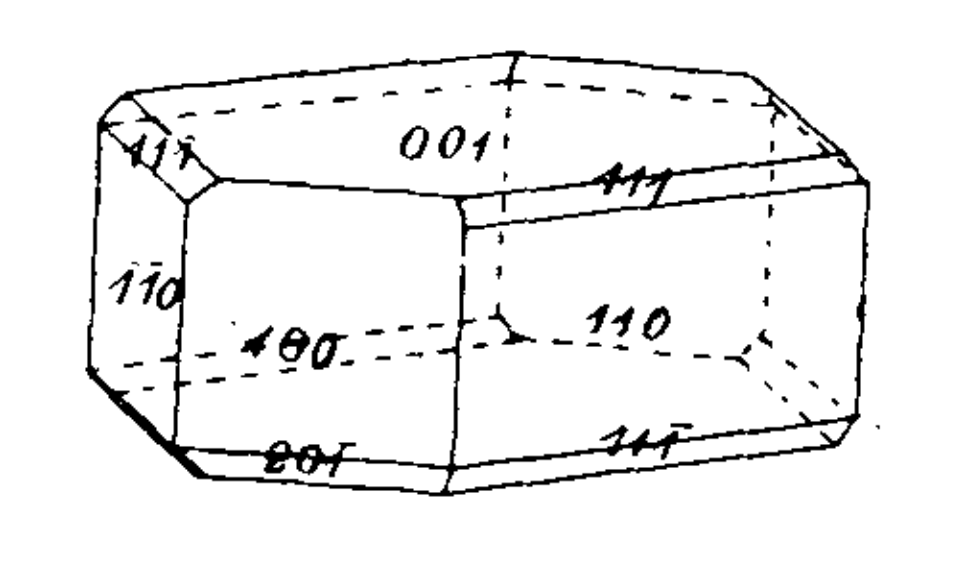
Cerium(III) nitrate crystal with Miller index notation

Anhydrous cerous nitrate, also called cerium(III) nitrate, is the anhydrous salt with the formula Ce(NO_{3})_{3}.(CAS number 10108-73-3).

Cerium nitrate hexahydrate, with the formula Ce(NO_{3})_{3}·6H_{2}O (CAS number 10294-41-4) is the most common nitrate of cerium(III). It is a component in a burn treatment cream that also includes silver sulphadiazine. Concentrations used are 0.05 M for the cerium nitrate. For very serious burns it reduces the death rate. At 150 °C the hexahydrate loses water of crystallization to make a trihydrate, which itself decomposes above 200 °C. Cerous nitrate hexahydrate has pinacoidal triclinic crystals.

Hydronium cerium(III) nitrate hydrate, Ce(NO_{3})_{5}(H_{3}O)_{2}⋅H_{2}O is monoclinic with space group P2/c. The diaquapentanitratocerate(III) anion (Ce(NO_{3})_{5}(H_{2}O)_{2})^{2−} occurs in several salts. The salts have extreme non-linear optical properties.

== Cerium(IV) nitrates ==
Cerium tetranitrate pentahydrate is prepared by evaporating a solution of ceric nitrate in concentrated nitric acid. It forms orthorhombic crystals with bipyramidal shape. The common crystal face Miller index is {111}, But it can have smaller faces with Miller index {010} and {110}. The density is 2.403 g/cm^{3}. Its optical properties are that it is biaxial with 2V of 34°, and strongly dispersive. On its B- and C-axes it appears yellow, but orange red on the A axis.

Ceric nitrate is quite soluble in non polar solvents such as ethyl ether. Ether will extract the cerium nitrate from 5N nitric acid. In nitric acid, nitrato ceric acid (H_{2}[Ce(NO_{3})_{6}] and H[Ce(NO_{3})_{5}⋅H_{2}O]) are present. The solubility of this nitrate in non-polar solvents allows the separation of cerium from other rare earths.

Basic cerium(IV) nitrate has the formula Ce(NO_{3})_{3}⋅OH⋅3H_{2}O. It also forms upon evaporation of solutions of cerium(IV) in nitric acid. When this meets ammonia in water solution it reacts to form ceric ammonium nitrate and ceric hydroxide.

Basic dicerium nitrate has the formula Ce_{2}O(NO_{3})_{6}(H_{2}O)_{6}·2H_{2}O. Again it crystallizes from solutions of cerium(IV) in nitric acid. It crystallises as monoclinic crystals with space group P2_{1}lc with unit cell dimensions a = 8.723 Å, b = 8.940 Å, c = 13.981 Å, β = 94.91°. Each unit cell contains two formula units Ce_{2}O(NO_{3})_{6}(H_{2}O)_{3} and Ce_{2}O(NO_{3})_{6} form when this basic nitrate is heated slowly to 180 °C in vacuum.

== Ammonium and alkali metal cerium nitrates ==
The diaquapentanitratocerate(III) anion (Ce(NO_{3})_{5}(H_{2}O)_{2})^{2−} occurs in several salts. The salts have extreme non-linear optical properties.

K_{2}Ce(NO_{3})_{5} crystals can be grown by evaporating a solution of potassium nitrate, cerous nitrate, and nitric acid. Each cerium atom is surrounded by the oxygen atoms of five bidentate nitrate groups and two water oxygen atoms. It can be grown into optical-quality crystals of around 100 cm^{3} in 12 weeks. Crystals are colourless. The space group of the crystal is Fdd2 and their form is orthorhombic. Potassium cerium nitrate was probably discovered by L. Th. Lange in 1861. However it was only properly described in 1894 by Fock. Even then the amount of water in the substance was wrong and it took till 1911 when Jantsch & Wigdorow correctly stated that there were two water molecules. The non-linear optical effects were found in 1993. For optical applications it is known as KCN.

Diammonium diaquapentanitratocerate dihydrate. Its Raman spectrum has been published. It is quite soluble in water with 100 ml dissolving 235 grams at 9 °C and 817 g at 65°.

- dirubidium diaquapentanitratocerate dihydrate.
- dicaesium diaquapentanitratocerate dihydrate, or caesium cerous nitrate Cs_{2}Ce(NO_{3})_{5}⋅2H_{2}O forms monoclinic crystals with crystal parameters a/b = 1.2052, c/b = 0.9816 and β = 103°41′.
- dithallium diaquapentanitratocerate dihydrate.
- Bis{4-[(4H-1,2,4-triazol-4-yl)iminomethyl]pyridinium} diaquapentanitratocerate. (C_{8}H_{8}N_{5})_{2}[Ce(NO_{3})_{5}(H_{2}O)_{2}] is monoclinic with space group C2/c.

name	formula	melt	density [g/cm^{3}]	a [Å]	b [Å]	c [Å]	β [°]	Vol	Z
dipotassium diaquapentanitratocerate	K_{2}Ce(NO_{3})_{5}·2H_{2}O		2.543	11.263	21.404	12.230	90	2948	8
dipotassium hexanitratocerate	K_{2}Ce(NO_{3})_{6}								
tripotassium dicerium(III) nitrate	K_{3}Ce_{2}(NO_{3})_{9}		2.525	13.597	13.597	13.597	90	2514	4
diammonium diaquapentanitratocerate dihydrate	(NH_{4})_{2}Ce(NO_{3})_{5}·4H_{2}O		2.128	11.09	8.936	17.96	101.77	1743	4
dirubidium diaquapentanitratocerate dihydrate	Rb_{2}Ce(NO_{3})_{5}·4H_{2}O	70°	2.497	11.050	8.977	17.859	100.88		
dicaesium diaquapentanitratocerate dihydrate ?	Cs_{2}Ce(NO_{3})_{5}·4H_{2}O								
dithallium diaquapentanitratocerate dihydrate ?	Tl_{2}Ce(NO_{3})_{5}·4H_{2}O	64.5°	3.326						
Bis{4-[(4H-1,2,4-triazol-4-yl)iminomethyl]pyridinium} diaquapentanitratocerate	(C_{8}H_{8}N_{5})_{2}[Ce(NO_{3})_{5}(H_{2}O)_{2}]			10.322	16.126	17.575	100.107	2883.2	4
1,10-Phenanthroline-H diaquapentanitratocerate	HPhen_{2}[Ce(NO_{3})_{5}(H_{2}O)_{2}]		1.83	7.5534	8.083	25.8377	89.947 β = 89.937 γ = 86.981	1572.94	2
hydronium cerium (III) nitrate hydrate	Ce(NO_{3})_{5}(H_{3}O)_{2}·H_{2}O			21.36	7.899	15.133	91.02		8

== Divalent double nitrates ==
Cerous magnesium nitrate is the first discovered member of a divalent series CeM(II)(NO_{3})_{5}. This has an extremely low Kapitza resistance to liquid ^{3}He. At the time of discovery it value was only 1% of the previous record holder. Low thermal resistance is important at temperatures below 1 K, because there is not much temperature difference to cause a large heat flow rate, and cooling can take an excessive time if there are barriers to heat transfer.

== Other cerous double nitrates ==
Cerous sodium nitrate monohydrate, Na_{2}Ce(NO_{3})_{5}·H_{2}O has density 2.641 g/cm^{3}. It can be made by boiling the stoichiometric mixture of cerous nitrate, and sodium nitrate in nitric acid, and then evaporating at 40 °C. The crystals are clear rod shaped monoclinic with space group P2/c. Crystal cell sizes are a = 21.387, b = 7.9328, c = 15.184, β = 90.657, V = 2576 formulas per cell, Z = 8. The way the components are arranged in the crystal is that there are six nitrates around each cerium atom, however to get to the average of five per cerium, two nitrate groups on each, link the atoms into a chain along the a axis.

There are anhydrous double nitrates such as Ce_{2}Rb_{3}(NO_{3})_{9} and Ce_{2}K_{3}(NO_{3})_{9}. The potassium salt, Ce_{2}K_{3}(NO_{3})_{9} can be made by using the water solution of potassium nitrate and cerous nitrate in 3:2 molar ratio, evaporated at 40 °C. The crystals are colourless cubic from space group P4_{1}32. Its formula weight is 955.6. Three formulas exist in each unit cell which at 20 °C, has a volume of 2514.1 Å^{3} and cell side of a = 13.597 Å. The density is 2.525 g/cm^{3}. In this compound each cerium atoms is surrounded by twelve oxygen atoms from six nitrate groups. Three of the nitrates form a bridge in each of three dimensions. These bridges form three spirals each at 90° to each other along the crystal axes.

A related series with ratio 1.5 of the monovalent ion to cerium includes 2Ce(NO_{3})_{3}·3(NH_{4})NO_{3}·12H_{2}O

A mixed caesium, sodium cerium triple nitrate Cs_{2}NaCe(NO_{3})_{6} crystallizes in the cubic system. The unit cell size is 1.1196 nm with volume of 1.4034 nm^{3} and four molecules per cell.

== Ceric double nitrates ==
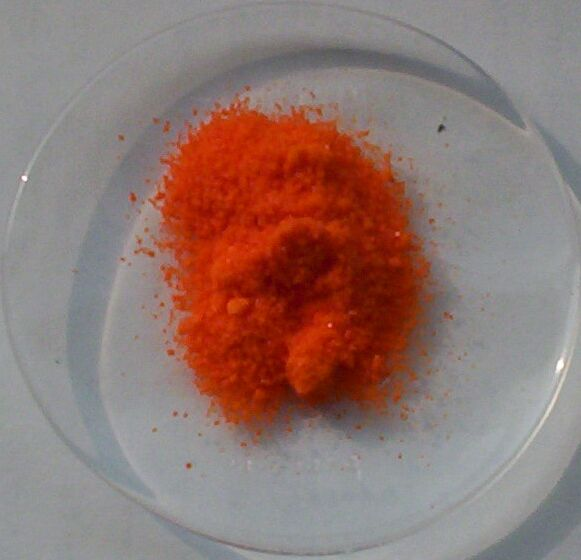
Diammonium cerium(IV) nitrate

The alkali metals form orange-red monoclinic crystals as a double salt with ceric nitrate: M_{2}[Ce(NO_{3})_{6}] with M = K, Rb, Cs, or [NH_{4}].

- Ceric ammonium nitrate contains the icosahedral shaped ion [Ce(NO_{3})_{6}]^{2−} which has cerium in the +4 oxidation state. It is used as a reagent in oxidimetry.
- Ceric potassium nitrate K_{2}[Ce(NO_{3})_{6}] has two different crystal forms, hexagonal and monoclinic. Slow evaporation and crystallization results in the monoclinic form. But fast crystallization results in a mixture of the two shapes. Both of these forms have six nitrate groups connected via two oxygens each to the cerium [Ce(NO_{3})_{6}]^{2−}. The substance is made by dissolving ceric hydroxide in nitric acid with the appropriate stoichiometric amount of potassium nitrate. In the hexagonal form the cerium atoms are arranged along a threefold axis. In hexagonal form the potassium ions are surrounded by nine oxygen atoms. These crystals are orange hexagonal shaped plates. Crystal cells contain three molecules, with a volume of 1063.1Å^{3} and dimensions of a = 13.5737 Å, c = 6.6624 Å with a density of 2.767 g/cm^{3}.

In the monoclinic form of K_{2}[Ce(NO_{3})_{6}], the cerium atoms are in a body centred arrangement, with potassium surrounded by ten oxygen atoms. The density is 2.798 g/cm^{3} with a cell that contains two molecules with volume 700.9 Å^{3} and dimensions a = 12.707 Å, b = 6.6858 Å, c = 8.253 Å and β = 91.55°.

Ceric potassium nitrate also has a hydrate with 1.5 mol of water.

- Ceric rubidium nitrate Rb_{2}[Ce(NO_{3})_{6}] is reddish yellow.
- Ceric caesium nitrate Cs_{2}[Ce(NO_{3})_{6}] is very insoluble in nitric acid and is bright yellow.
- The thallium double salt cannot be produced because the ceric ion oxidizes thallium(I) to thallium(III).

=== Divalent metals ===
- Ceric magnesium nitrate Mg[Ce(NO_{3})_{6}⋅8H_{2}O]
- Ceric zinc nitrate Zn[Ce(NO_{3})_{6}⋅8H_{2}O]
- Ceric nickel nitrate Ni[Ce(NO_{3})_{6}⋅8H_{2}O]
- Ceric cobalt nitrate Co[Ce(NO_{3})_{6}⋅8H_{2}O]
- Ceric manganese nitrate Mn[Ce(NO_{3})_{6}⋅8H_{2}O]

== Other compounds ==
- [Ce_{6}O(OH)_{8}(NO_{3})_{6}(H_{2}O)_{16}]·(NO_{3})_{2}·2H_{2}O is a hexanuclear cerium oxido and hydroxido complex. It can be dehydrated to form [Ce_{6}O(OH)_{8}(NO_{3})_{8}].

== Application ==
Cerium magnesium nitrate (also known as cerous magnesium nitrate), is a highly paramagnetic salt used as refrigerant in magnetic refrigeration. This nitrate was used for its paramagnetic properties in a pivotal 1956 physics experiment that proved parity violation by the weak interaction.
