= Thorium oxide =

Thorium oxide may refer to:

- Thorium monoxide (thorium(II) oxide), ThO
- Thorium dioxide (thorium(IV) oxide), ThO_{2}
