= Cerium(IV) oxide =

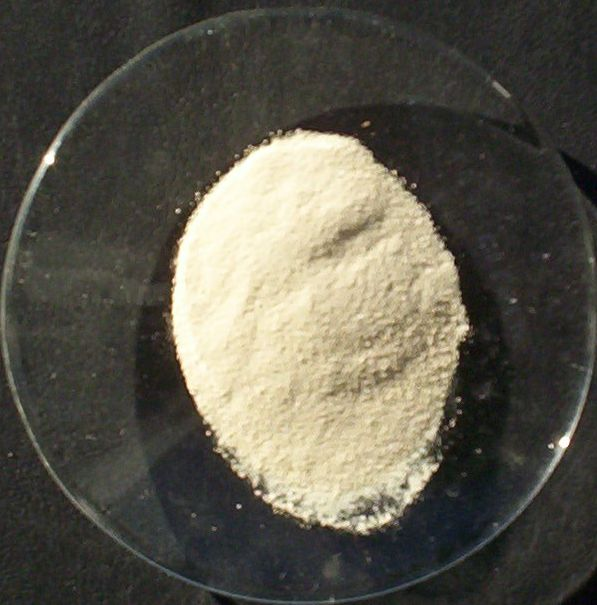
- Cerium(IV) oxide

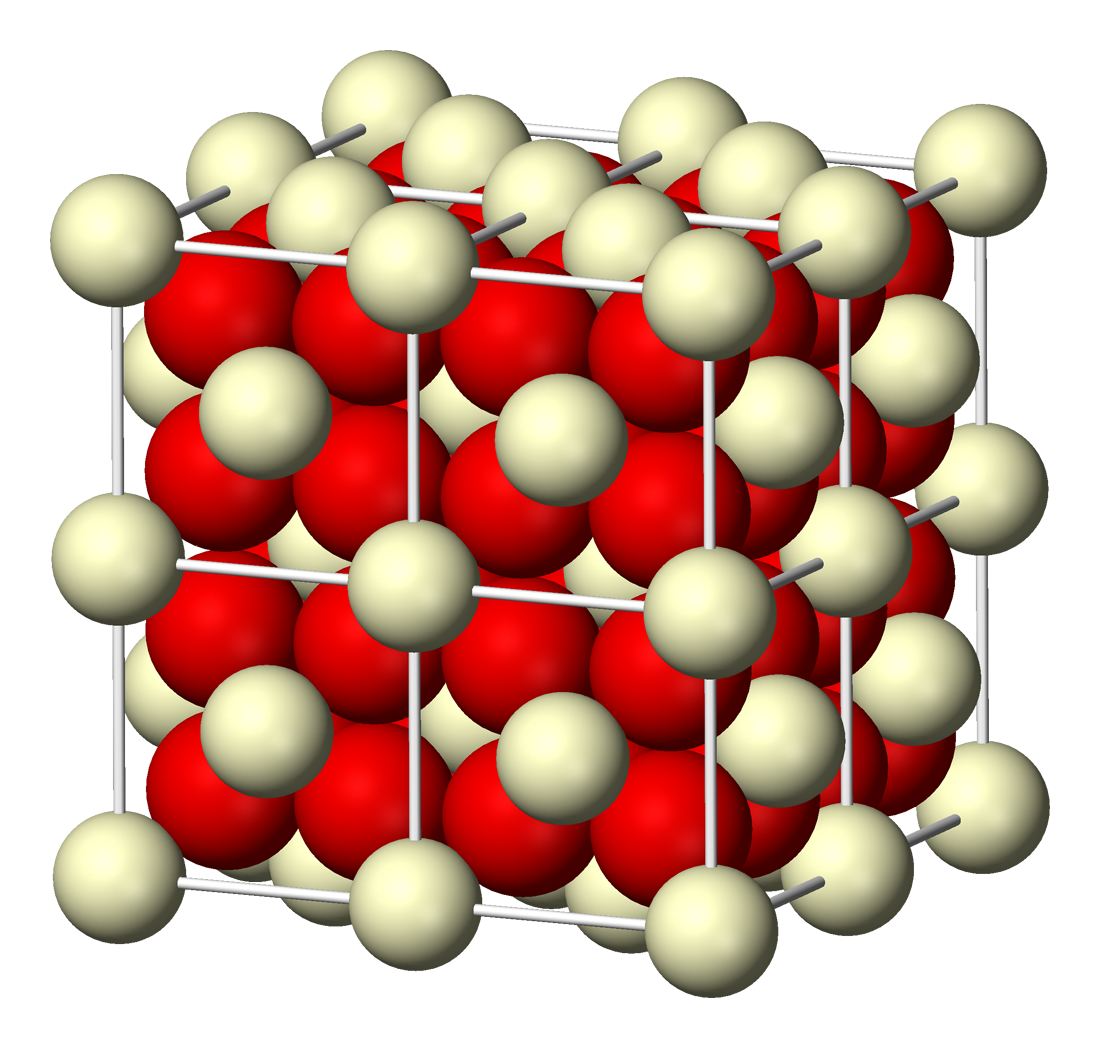

Names
- IUPAC name Cerium(IV) oxide
- Other names Ceric oxide, Ceria, Cerium dioxide

Identifiers
| CAS Number | 1306-38-3; 23322-64-7 (hydrate) |
| 3D model (JSmol) | Interactive image |
| ChEBI | CHEBI:79089 |
| ChemSpider | 8395107 |
| ECHA InfoCard | 100.013.774 |
| PubChem CID | 73963 |
| UNII | 619G5K328Y; 20GT4M7CWG (hydrate) |
| CompTox Dashboard (EPA) | DTXSID4040214 |
- InChI: InChI=1S/Ce.2O/q+4;2*-2 Key: OFJATJUUUCAKMK-UHFFFAOYSA-N; InChI=1/Ce.2O/q+4;2*-2 Key: OFJATJUUUCAKMK-UHFFFAOYAX
- SMILES: [O-2]=[Ce+4]=[O-2]

Properties
| Chemical formula | CeO_{2} |
| Molar mass | 172.115 g/mol |
| Appearance | white or pale yellow solid, slightly hygroscopic |
| Density | 7.215 g/cm^{3} |
| Melting point | 2,400 °C (4,350 °F; 2,670 K) |
| Boiling point | 3,500 °C (6,330 °F; 3,770 K) |
| Solubility in water | insoluble |
| Magnetic susceptibility (χ) | +26.0·10^{−6} cm^{3}/mol |

Structure
| Crystal structure | cubic crystal system, cF12 (fluorite) |
| Space group | Fm3̅m, #225 |
| Lattice constant | a = 5.41 Å, b = 5.41 Å, c = 5.41 Å α = 90°, β = 90°, γ = 90° |
| Coordination geometry | Ce, 8, cubic O, 4, tetrahedral |

Hazards
| NFPA 704 (fire diamond) | 1 0 0 |

Related compounds
| Related compounds | Cerium(III) oxide |
- Except where otherwise noted, data are given for materials in their standard state (at 25 °C [77 °F], 100 kPa). verify (what is ?) Infobox references

Cerium(IV) oxide, also known as ceric oxide, ceric dioxide, ceria, cerium oxide or cerium dioxide, is an oxide of the rare-earth metal cerium. It is a pale yellow-white powder with the chemical formula CeO_{2}. It is an important commercial product and an intermediate in the purification of the element from the ores. The distinctive property of this material is its reversible conversion to a non-stoichiometric oxide.

== Production ==
Cerium occurs naturally as oxides, always as a mixture with other rare-earth elements. Its principal ores are bastnaesite and monazite. After extraction of the metal ions into aqueous base, Ce is separated from that mixture by addition of an oxidant followed by adjustment of the pH. This step exploits the low solubility of CeO_{2} and the fact that other rare-earth elements resist oxidation.

Cerium(IV) oxide is formed by the calcination of cerium oxalate or cerium hydroxide.

Cerium also forms cerium(III) oxide, Ce_{2}O_{3}, which oxidizes in air to cerium(IV) oxide.

== Structure and defect behavior ==
Cerium oxide adopts the fluorite structure, space group Fm3̅m, #225 containing 8-coordinate Ce^{4+} and 4-coordinate O^{2−}. At high temperatures it releases oxygen to give a non-stoichiometric, anion deficient form that retains the fluorite lattice. This material has the formula CeO_{(2−x)}, where 0 < x < 0.28. The value of x depends on both the temperature, surface termination and the oxygen partial pressure. The equation

$$\frac{x}{0.35 - x} = \left(\frac{106\,000\text{ Pa}}{P_{\mathrm{O}_2}}\right)^{0.217} \exp\left( \frac{-195.6\text{ kJ/mol}}{RT} \right)$$

has been shown to predict the equilibrium non-stoichiometry x over a wide range of oxygen partial pressures (10^{3}–10^{−4} Pa) and temperatures (1000–1900 °C).

The non-stoichiometric form, which has a blue to black appearance, exhibits both ionic and electronic conduction with ionic being the most significant at temperatures > 500 °C.

The number of oxygen vacancies is frequently measured by using X-ray photoelectron spectroscopy to compare the ratio of Ce^{3+}to Ce^{4+}.

The loss of oxygen continues into the molten liquid state where the local Ce-O coordination number drops to predominantly 6-fold, compared to 8-fold in the stoichiometric fluorite structure. This has been shown to be directly analogous to plutonium oxides, once differences in oxygen potential are accounted for.

=== Defect chemistry ===
In the most stable fluorite phase of ceria, it exhibits several defects depending on partial pressure of oxygen or stress state of the material.

The primary defects of concern are oxygen vacancies and small polarons (electrons localized on cerium cations). Increasing the concentration of oxygen defects increases the diffusion rate of oxide anions in the lattice as reflected in an increase in ionic conductivity. These factors give ceria favorable performance in applications as a solid electrolyte in solid-oxide fuel cells. Undoped and doped ceria also exhibit high electronic conductivity at low partial pressures of oxygen due to reduction of the cerium ion leading to the formation of small polarons. Since the oxygen atoms in a ceria crystal occur in planes, diffusion of these anions is facile. The diffusion rate increases as the defect concentration increases.

== Natural occurrence ==
Cerium(IV) oxide occurs naturally as the mineral cerianite-(Ce). It is a rare example of tetravalent cerium mineral, the other examples being stetindite-(Ce) and dyrnaesite-(La). The "-(Ce)" suffix is known as Levinson modifier and is used to show which element dominates in a particular site in the structure. It is often found in names of minerals bearing rare earth elements (REEs). Occurrence of cerianite-(Ce) is related to some examples of cerium anomaly, where Ce - which is oxidized easily - is separated from other REEs that remain trivalent and thus fit to structures of other minerals than cerianite-(Ce).

== Applications ==
The principal industrial application of ceria is for polishing, especially chemical-mechanical planarization (CMP). For this purpose, it has displaced many other oxides that were previously used, such as iron oxide and zirconia. For hobbyists, it is also known as "opticians' rouge".

In its other main application, CeO_{2} is used to decolorize glass. It functions by converting green-tinted ferrous impurities to nearly colorless ferric oxides.

=== Other niche and emerging applications ===
==== Catalysis ====
CeO_{2} has attracted attention in the area of heterogeneous catalysis. It catalyses the water-gas shift reaction. It oxidizes carbon monoxide. Its reduced derivative Ce_{2}O_{3} reduces water, with release of hydrogen.

The interconvertibility of CeO_{x} materials is the basis of the use of ceria for an oxidation catalyst. One small but illustrative use is its use in the walls of self-cleaning ovens as a hydrocarbon oxidation catalyst during the high-temperature cleaning process. Another small scale but famous example is its role in oxidation of natural gas in gas mantles.

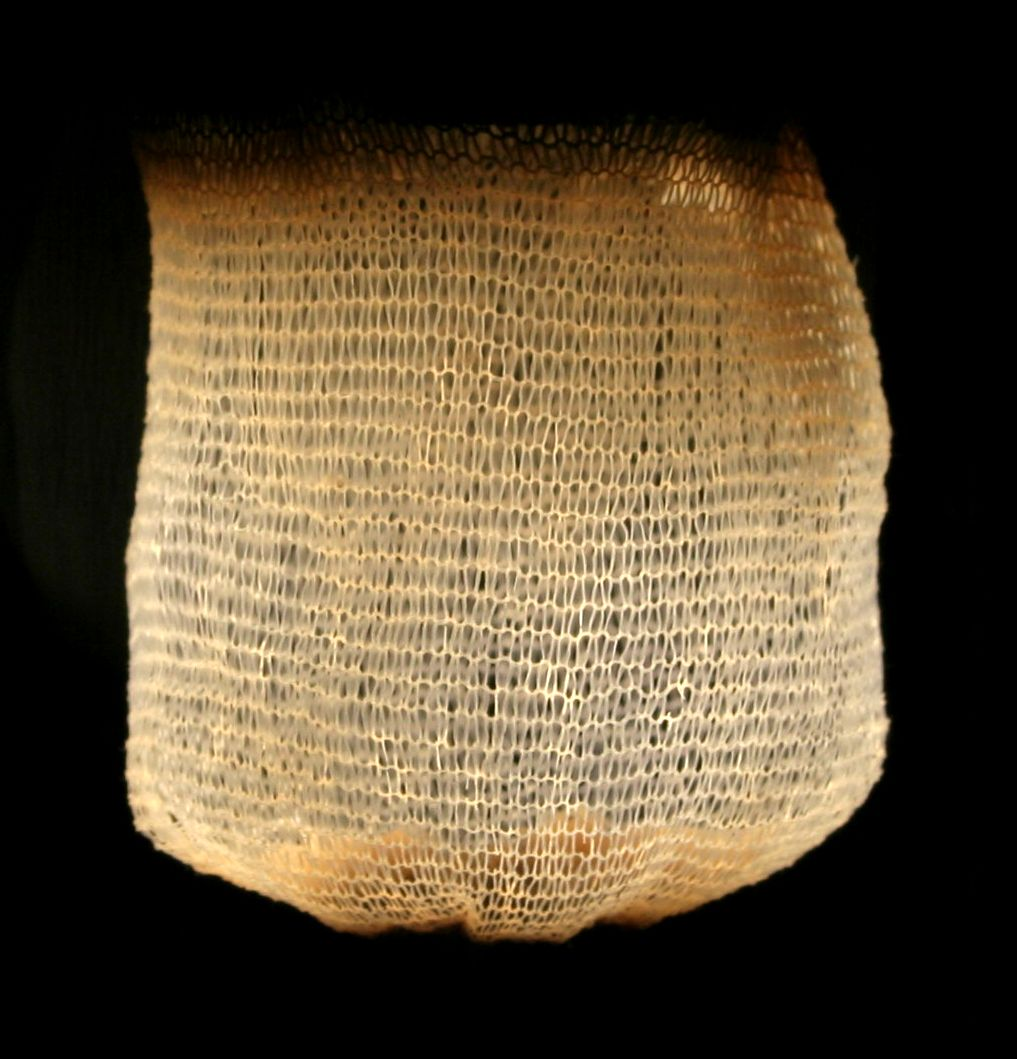
A glowing Coleman white gas lantern mantle. The glowing element is mainly ThO_{2} doped with CeO_{2}, heated by the Ce-catalyzed oxidation of the natural gas with air.

Building on its distinct surface interactions, ceria finds further use as a sensor in catalytic converters in automotive applications, controlling the air-exhaust ratio to reduce NO_{x} and carbon monoxide emissions.

==== Energy & fuels ====
Due to the significant ionic and electronic conduction of cerium oxide, it is well suited to be used as a mixed conductor. As such, cerium oxide is a material of interest for solid oxide fuel cells (SOFCs) in comparison to zirconium oxide.

Thermochemically, the cerium(IV) oxide–cerium(III) oxide cycle or CeO_{2}/Ce_{2}O_{3} cycle is a two-step water splitting process that has been used for hydrogen production. Because it leverages the oxygen vacancies between systems, this allows ceria in water to form hydroxyl (OH) groups. The hydroxyl groups can then be released as oxygen oxidizes, thus providing a source of clean energy.

==== Optics ====
Cerium oxide is highly valued in the optics industry for its exceptional polishing capabilities. It effectively removes minor scratches and imperfections from glass surfaces through both mechanical abrasion and chemical interaction, producing a smooth, high-gloss finish. Cerium oxide can also enhance the durability of optical surfaces by forming a protective layer that increases resistance to scratches and environmental wear.

Cerium oxide has also found use in infrared filters and as a replacement for thorium dioxide in incandescent mantles

==== Welding ====
Cerium oxide is used as an addition to tungsten electrodes for Gas Tungsten Arc Welding. It provides advantages over pure Tungsten electrodes such as reducing electrode consumption rate and easier arc starting & stability. Ceria electrodes were first introduced in the US market in 1987, and are useful in AC, DC Electrode Positive, and DC Electrode Negative.

== Safety aspects ==
Cerium oxide nanoparticles (nanoceria) have been investigated for their antibacterial and antioxidant activity.

Nanoceria is a prospective replacement of zinc oxide and titanium dioxide in sunscreens, as it has lower photocatalytic activity.

== See also ==
- Cerium
- Cerium anomaly
- Zircon
