= Noddack =

Noddack is the name of:

- Ida Noddack, German physicist and wife of Walter Noddack
- Walter Noddack, German physicist and husband of Ida Noddack
