= Ida Noddack =

German chemist (1896–1978)

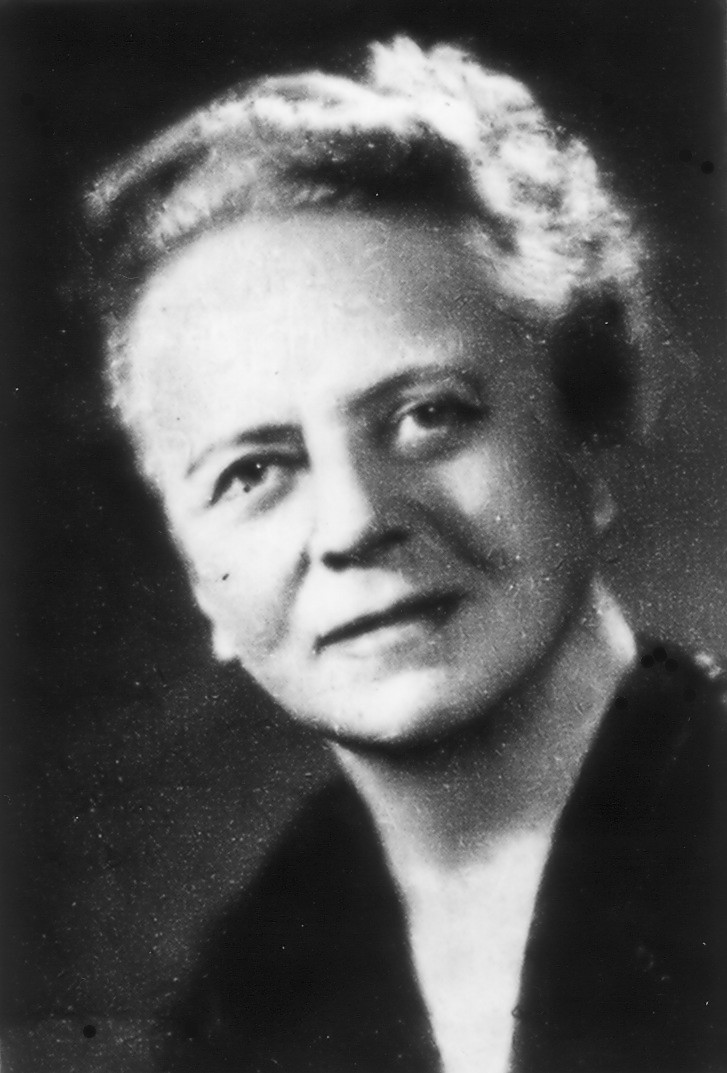
- Noddack in 1940
- Born: Ida Tacke; 25 February 1896; Lackhausen, Rhine Province, Prussia, German Empire
- Died: 24 September 1978 (aged 82); Bad Neuenahr, Rhineland-Palatinate, West Germany
- Citizenship: German
- Education: Technische Universität Berlin
- Known for: Rhenium, nuclear fission
- Spouse: Walter Noddack (m. 1928)
- Awards: Liebig Medal; Scheele Medal 3x Nobel Prize Nominations
- Scientific career
- Fields: Chemist and physicist
- Workplaces: Allgemein Elektrizität Gesellschaft, Berlin; Siemens & Halske, Berlin; Physikalische Technische Reichsanstalt, Berlin; University of Freiburg, University of Strasbourg; Staatliche Forschungs Institut für Geochemie, Bamberg

Ida Noddack (25 February 1896 – 24 September 1978), née Tacke, was a German chemist and physicist. In 1934 she was the first to mention the idea later named nuclear fission. With her husband Walter Noddack, and Otto Berg, she discovered element 75, rhenium. She was nominated three times for the Nobel Prize in Chemistry.

== Background ==
Ida Tacke was born in Lackhausen (nowadays a part of the city of Wesel) in the northern Rhine region in 1896. She described how she picked her path of study by stating, "since I did not want to be a teacher at all, and research and industry employed proportionally fewer physicists at that time, I decided to become a chemist– a decision that was welcomed by my father who owned a small varnish factory in the Lower Rhine region." She chose to attend the Technische Hochschule Charlottenburg because she was drawn to its long and demanding programs. She entered the school in 1915, six years after women were allowed to study in all of Berlin's universities. Nine out of the eighty-five members of her class studied chemistry.

In 1918, she graduated from the university with a degree in chemical and metallurgical engineering, specifically on higher aliphatic fatty acid anhydrides. She was one of the first women in Germany to study chemistry, and she was a part of one of the first generations of female students in Germany. In addition, the percent of women studying chemistry increased from 3% before World War I to 35% during the war. After graduating, she worked in the chemistry laboratory of the Berlin turbine factory of AEG, which is a company that is affiliated with General Electric in the United States.

The building she worked in, designed by Peter Behrens, was world-famous and resembled a turbine. She met her husband, Walter Noddack, at the Technische Hochschule Charlottenburg while he was working as a researcher. They were married in 1926. Both before and after their marriage they worked as partners, an "Arbeitsgemeinschaft" or "work unit."

== Nuclear fission ==
In 1934, Enrico Fermi bombarded uranium with neutrons in his laboratory in Rome, and identified a new type of radioactivity whose atomic chemistry differed greatly from uranium and similar elements. He published his findings claiming this to be evidence of a new transuranic element. Ida Noddack published a paper questioning Fermi’s conclusion. Noddack correctly criticized Enrico Fermi's chemical proofs in his 1934 neutron bombardment experiments, from which he postulated that transuranic elements might have been produced. This theory was widely accepted for a few years. However, Noddack's paper "On Element 93" suggested a number of possibilities, but centered on Fermi's failure to chemically eliminate all lighter than uranium elements in his proofs, rather than only down to lead.

The paper is considered historically significant today not simply because she correctly pointed out the flaw in Fermi's chemical proof but because she suggested the possibility that "it is conceivable that the nucleus breaks up into several large fragments, which would of course be isotopes of known elements but would not be neighbors of the irradiated element." In doing so she presaged what would become known a few years later as nuclear fission.

However, as Noddack's theory did not exhibit experimental proof or a theoretical basis, the paper was generally ignored and mocked. Several German scientists, like Otto Hahn, saw Noddack's work as "ridiculous." A woman's position in the workplace had been dwindling for years due to the 1929 Wall Street crash. In 1932, a German law, replicating others in Europe, was put into place that obligated married women to leave their jobs and become housewives so that there would be more positions available for men. Noddack was able to escape this law due to her status as an "unpaid collaborator." This may have caused her to be looked down upon by men in the field as she was only able to work due to this loophole.

Noddack's idea of nuclear fission was not confirmed until much later. Experiments along a similar line to Fermi's, by Irène Joliot-Curie, Frédéric Joliot-Curie and Pavle Savić in 1938 raised what they called "interpretational difficulties" when the supposed transuranics exhibited the properties of rare earths rather than those of adjacent elements. Ultimately on December 17, 1938, Otto Hahn and Fritz Strassmann provided chemical proof that the previously presumed transuranic elements were isotopes of barium, and Hahn wrote these exciting results to his exiled colleague Lise Meitner, explaining the process as a 'bursting' of the uranium nucleus into lighter elements.

Meitner and Otto Frisch utilized Fritz Kalckar and Niels Bohr's liquid drop hypothesis (first proposed by George Gamow in 1935) to provide a first theoretical model and mathematical proof of what Frisch coined nuclear fission. Frisch also experimentally verified the fission reaction by means of a cloud chamber, confirming the energy release. Therefore, Noddack's original hypothesis was finally accepted.

== Element discovery ==
Noddack and her husband-to-be looked for the then still unknown elements 43 and 75 at the Physikalisch-Technische Reichsanstalt. In 1925, they published a paper (Zwei neue Elemente der Mangangruppe, Chemischer Teil) and called the new elements rhenium (75) and masurium (43). They named the elements rhenium in respect of Ida's birthplace, and masurium in honor of his. After scientists were sceptical of their results, the Noddacks began to perform more experiments to confirm their discoveries. Only rhenium's discovery was confirmed. They were unable to isolate element 43 and their results were not reproducible. These achievements led to Ida being awarded the German Chemical Society's prestigious Liebig Medal in 1931.

Element 43 was definitively isolated in 1937 by Emilio Segrè and Carlo Perrier from a discarded piece of molybdenum foil from a cyclotron which had undergone beta decay. It was eventually named technetium due to its artificial source. No isotope of technetium has a half-life longer than 4.2 million years and was presumed to have disappeared on Earth as a naturally occurring element.

In 1961 minute amounts of technetium in pitchblende produced from spontaneous ^{238}U fission were discovered by B. T. Kenna and Paul K. Kuroda. Based on this discovery, Belgian physicist Pieter van Assche constructed an analysis of their data to show that the detection limit of Noddacks' analytical method could have been 1000 times lower than the 10^{−9} value reported in their paper, in order to show the Noddacks could have been the first to find measurable amounts of element 43, as the ores they had analyzed contained uranium. Using Van Assche's estimates of the Noddacks' residue compositions, NIST scientist John T. Armstrong, simulated the original X-ray spectrum with a computer, and claimed that the results were "surprisingly close to their published spectrum!" Gunter Herrmann from the University of Mainz examined van Assche's arguments, and concluded they were developed ad hoc, and forced to a predetermined result.

According to Kenna and Kuroda ^{99}_{43}Tc content expected in a typical pitchblende (50% uranium) is about 10^{−10} g/kg of ore. F. Habashi pointed out that uranium was never more than about 5% in Noddacks' columbite samples, and the amount of element 43 could not exceed 3×10^{−11} μg/kg of ore. Such a low quantity could not be weighed, nor give X-ray lines of element 43 clearly distinguishable from the background noise. The only way to detect its presence was to carry out radioactive measurements, a technique the Noddacks were not able to employ, but Segrè and Perrier did.

Following on the van Assche and Armstrong claims, an investigation was made into the works of Masataka Ogawa who had made a prior claim to the Noddacks. In 1908 he claimed to have isolated element 43, calling it Nipponium. Using an original plate (not a simulation), Kenji Yoshihara determined Ogawa had not found the Period 5 Group 7 element 43 (eka-manganese), but had successfully separated Period 6 Group 7 element 75 (dvi-manganese) (rhenium), preceding the Noddacks by 17 years. However this claim has been disputed by chemistry historian Eric Scerri in his book titled "A Tale of Seven Elements".

== Notable nominations and awards ==
Ida Noddack was nominated three times for the Nobel Prize in Chemistry due to her discovery of rhenium and masurium. Noddack and her husband were repeatedly nominated for the Nobel Prize in 1932, 1933, 1935 and 1937 (once by Walther Nernst and K. L. Wagner for 1933; both Noddacks were nominated by W. J. Müller for 1935 and by A. Skrabal for 1937). The two of them were also awarded the German Chemical Society's prestigious Liebig Medal in 1931. In 1934, they received the Scheele Medal of the Swedish Chemical Society as well as the German patent for rhenium concentrate.

In 2020 a memorial medal of the discovery was issued by ISTR, designed by Igor Petrov.

== Bibliography ==
- Tacke, Ida, and D. Holde. 1921. Über Anhydride höherer aliphatischer Fettesäuren. Berlin, TeH., Diss., 1921. (On higher aliphatic fatty acid anhydrides )
- Noddack, Walter, Otto Berg, and Ida Tacke. 1925. Zwei neue Elemente der Mangangruppe, Chemischer Teil. [Berlin: In Kommission bei W. de Gruyter]. (Two new elements of the manganese chemical group)
- Noddack, Ida, and Walter Noddack. 1927. Das Rhenium. Ergebnisse Der Exakten Naturwissenschaften. 6. Bd. (1927) (Rhenium)
- Noddack, Ida, and Walter Noddack. 1933. Das Rhenium. Leipzig: Leopold Foss. (Rhenium)
- Noddack, Ida (1934). Über das Element 93. Angewandte Chemie. 47(37): 653-655. (On Element 93).
- Noddack, Walter, and Ida Noddack. 1937. Aufgaben und Ziele der Geochemie. Freiburger wissenschaftliche Gesellschaft, Hft. 26. Freiburg im Breisgau: H. Speyer, H.F. Schulz. (Tasks and goals of Geochemistry)
- Noddack, Ida, and Walter Noddack. 1939. Die Häufigkeiten der Schwermetalle in Meerestieren. Arkiv för zoologi, Bd. 32, A, Nr. 4. Stockholm: Almqvist & Wiksell. (The frequency of heavy metals in marine animals)
- Noddack, Ida. 1942. Entwicklung und Aufbau der chemischen Wissenschaft. Freiburg i.Br: Schulz. (The development and structure of chemical science)
