= Otto Berg (scientist) =

German scientist (1874–1939)

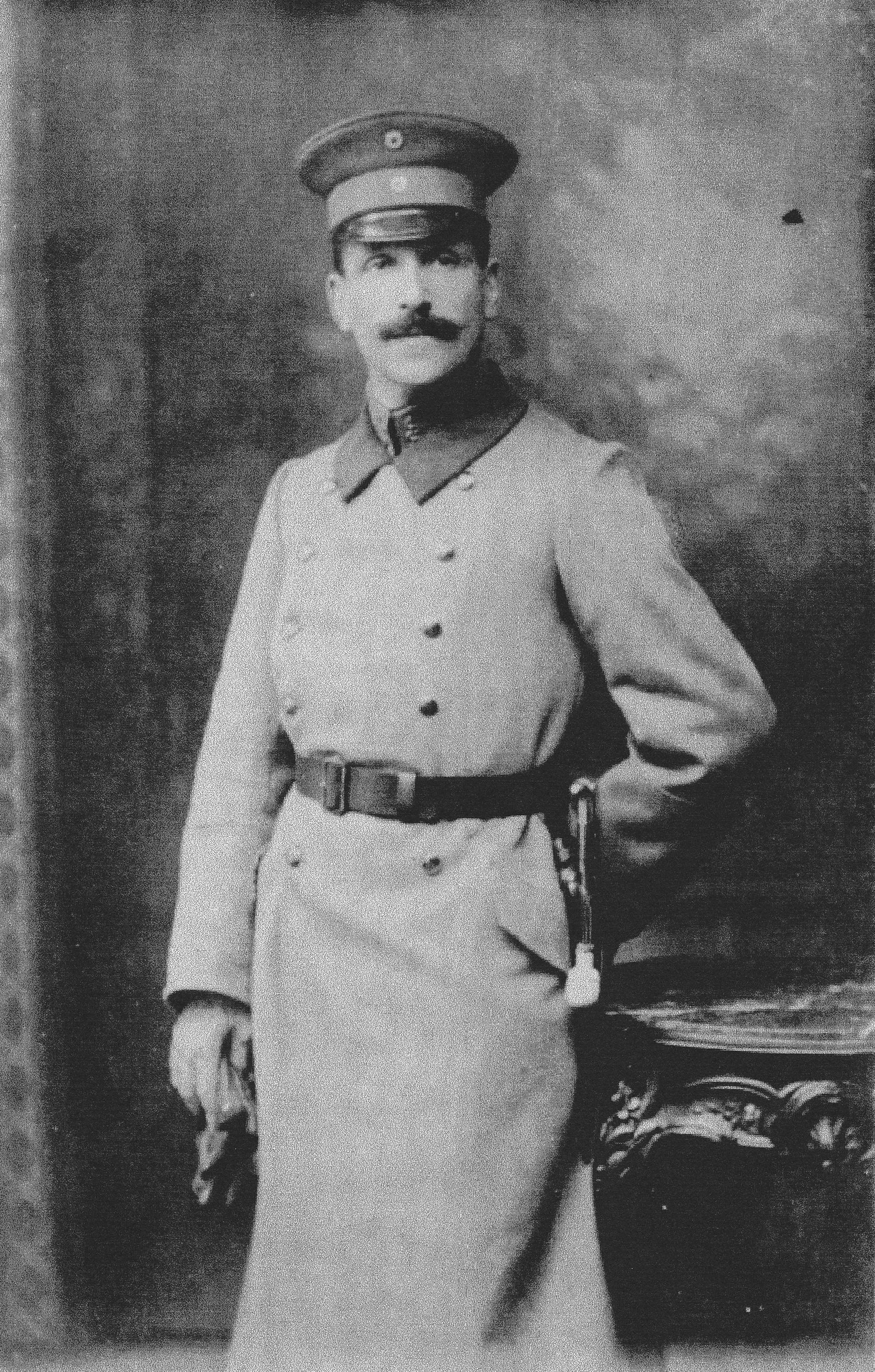
- Photo of Otto Berg
- Born: November 23, 1874; Berlin
- Died: 1939 (aged 64–65); England
- Occupation: scientist

Otto Berg (23 November 1874 – 1939) was a German scientist. He is one of the scientists credited with discovering rhenium, the last element to be discovered having a stable isotope.

== Life ==
Berg was born in Berlin as the son of the merchant Philipp Berg and his wife Jenny. From 1894 to 1898, Berg studied chemistry in Berlin, Heidelberg and Freiburg; in Freiburg he worked as an assistant at the Institute of Physics. In 1900, he married Julie Zuntz, a daughter of physiologist Nathan Zuntz; the couple had four children. Between 1902 and 1911, he was a Privatdozent in Greifswald. He then became a partner at Siemens & Halske in Berlin-Charlottenburg. After the Nazi seizure of power he lost his job at Siemens in 1933 because of his Jewish descent, subsequently in 1938 he fled with his family to England, where he died in 1939.

== Rhenium ==
In 1925 in Germany, Walter Noddack, Ida Tacke, and Otto Berg reported that they detected the element in platinum ore and in the mineral columbite. They also found rhenium in gadolinite and molybdenite. In 1928 they were able to extract 1 gram of the element by processing 660 kg of molybdenite. In 2020 a memorial medal of the discovery was issued by ISTR (art-designer: Igor Petrov).

== Technetium ==
The same team was also involved in the claimed discovery of technetium. They reported the discovery of element 75 and element 43 in 1925 and named element 43 masurium (after Masuria in eastern Prussia, now in Poland, the region where Walter Noddack's family originated). The group bombarded columbite with a beam of electrons and deduced element 43 was present by examining X-ray diffraction spectrograms. The wavelength of the X-rays produced is related to the atomic number by a formula derived by Henry Moseley in 1913. The team claimed to detect a faint X-ray signal at a wavelength produced by element 43. Contemporary experimenters could not replicate the discovery, and it was dismissed as an error for many years. Some more recent attempts have been made to rehabilitate the Noddacks' claims, but they are disproved by Paul Kuroda's study on the amount of technetium that could have been present in the ores they studied: it could not have exceeded 3 × 10^{−11} μg/kg of ore, and thus would have been undetectable by the Noddacks' methods. Discovery of element 43 was finally confirmed by a 1937 experiment in Sicily.
