= Mitzi Kuroda =

American geneticist

Mitzi Kuroda is a professor of genetics at Harvard Medical School and Brigham and Women's Hospital. She was an HHMI Investigator at Brigham and Women's Hospital from 1993 to 2007. She has identified many genes and enzymes involved in epigenetic regulation in the fruit fly. In addition, her research has shown the importance of epigenetics in cancer. Her laboratory has identified chromatin remodeling signals and processes that predispose cells to be transformed into cancer cells.

== Early life and education ==
Mitzi Kuroda was born in 1958 in Fayetteville, Arkansas, where she attended elementary and junior high schools. She spent a year in Tokyo before returning to attend Fayetteville High School where she graduated as valedictorian in 1977. Her father was chemist Paul Kuroda.

Mitzi Kuroda said, "When I learned about recombinant DNA in college, it captured my imagination. I had to toss aside all my plans to 'save the world' because the ability to make specific DNA molecules for molecular genetic experiments was just too enticing." Kuroda received her BS in biology from Tulane University in 1981 and her PhD in biological sciences at Stanford University, working with mentor Charles Yanofsky. Kuroda's work with Yanofsky involved collaboration with Iwona Stroynowski to reveal how a riboswitch mechanism called bacterial attenuation regulates operons for amino acid biosynthesis.

== Academic research career ==
After postdoctoral work at Stanford, Kuroda became a faculty member at Baylor College of Medicine. She rose through the ranks at Baylor to full professor. In 2003, she moved to Harvard Medical School. Kuroda initially concentrated on regulation processes in the fruit fly. Her citation by the National Academy of Sciences upon her election said, "Her lab identified the MSL ribonucleoprotein complex, and discovered that it assembles and spreads from sites of non-coding roX RNA synthesis to regulate genes specifically on the fruit fly male X chromosome. Furthermore, they dissected the sex-specific regulation of this process, and the molecular mechanism by which the MSL complex influences transcriptional elongation." She has developed an important technique in which epigenetic regulators and their targets are cross-linked, then analyzed via mass spectrometry. In 2017, her laboratory discovered a master regulatory complex for Drosophila development.

Recently, she has begun studies of regulation in cancer cells. Kuroda's laboratory has shown that BRD4-NUT regulator leads to cancer via causing histone modification changes that produce a cascade of remodeling in which domains are opened to allow inappropriate expression of genes by transcription of their RNA.

== Honors and awards ==
- 1992 Searle Scholar

https://www.searlescholars.net/person/253

- 2013 National Academy of Sciences
- National Academy of Arts and Sciences

== Personal life ==
Kuroda is married to geneticist Stephen Elledge, and they have two grown children.

== Selected works ==
- Alekseyenko, AA; Walsh, EM; Wang, X; Grayson, AR; Hsi, PT; Kharchenko, PV; Kuroda, MI; French, CA (2015). "The oncogenic BRD4-NUT chromatin regulator drives aberrant transcription within large topological domains". Genes Dev. 29 (14): 1507–1523. doi:10.1101/gad.267583.115. PMC 4526735. PMID 26220994.
- Kang, HJ; McElroy, KA; Jung, YL; Alekseyenko, AA; Zee, BM; Park, PJ; Kuroda, MI (2015). "Sex comb on midleg (Scm) is a functional link between PcG-repressive complexes in Drosophila". Genes Dev. 29 (11): 1136–1150. doi:10.1101/gad.260562.115. PMC 4470282. PMID 26063573.
- Ho, JWK; Jung, YL; Liu, T (2014). "Comparative analysis of metazoan chromatin organization". Nature. 512 (7515): 449–452. Bibcode:2014Natur.512..449H. doi:10.1038/nature13415. PMC 4227084. PMID 25164756.
- Alekseyenko, AA; Gorchakov, AA; Zee, BM; Fuchs, SM; Kharchenko, PV; Kuroda, MI (2014). "Heterochromatin-associated interactions of Drosophila HP1a with dADD1, HIPP1, and repetitive RNAs". Genes Dev. 28 (13): 1445–1460. doi:10.1101/gad.241950.114. PMC 4083088. PMID 24990964.
- Ferrari, F; Plachetka, A; Alekseyenko, AA; Jung, YL; Ozsolak, F; Kharchenko, PV; Park, PJ; Kuroda, MI (2013). ""Jumpstart and gain" model for dosage compensation in Drosophila based on direct sequencing of nascent transcripts". Cell Rep. 5 (3): 629–636. doi:10.1016/j.celrep.2013.09.037. PMC 3852897. PMID 24183666.
- Larschan, E; Bishop, EP; Kharchenko, PV; Core, LJ; Lis, JT; Park, PJ; Kuroda, MI (2011). "X chromosome dosage compensation via enhanced transcriptional elongation in Drosophila". Nature. 471 (7336): 115–118. Bibcode:2011Natur.471..115L. doi:10.1038/nature09757. PMC 3076316. PMID 21368835.
