= Bette Korber =

American computational biologist

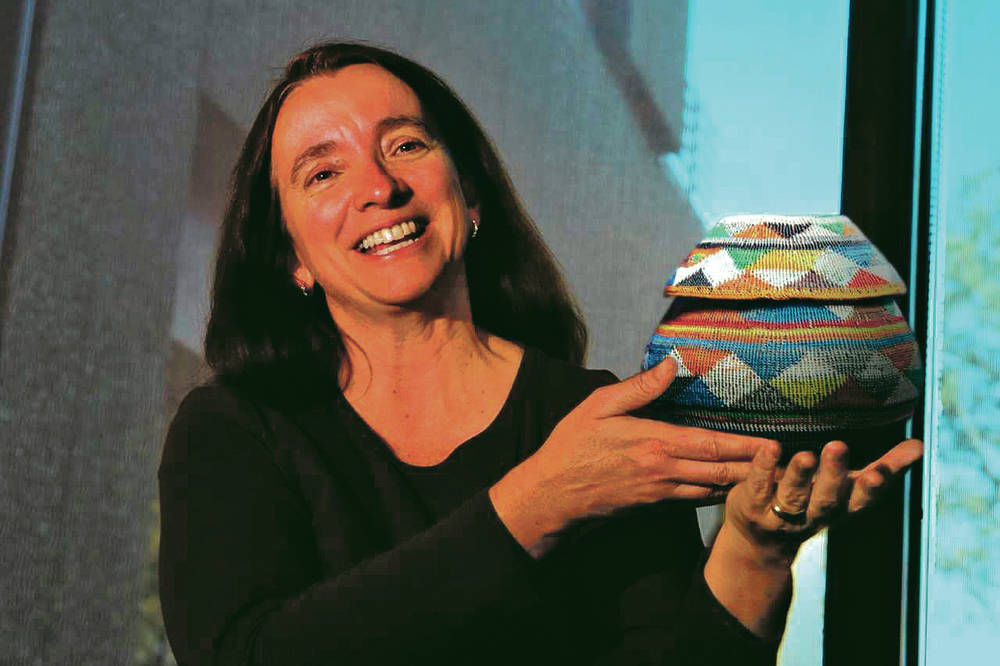
- Korber with basket made for her by Zulu women at the orphanage she helped found
- Education: California State University Long Beach, California Institute of Technology
- Known for: designing AIDS vaccines using HIV virus database
- Awards: Richard Feynman Award for Innovation 2018, Thomson Reuters Corporation 100 most influential scientists of decade 2014, Ernest Orlando Lawrence Award 2004, Los Alamos National Laboratory fellow 2002, Distinguished Alumna of CSULB 2001, Elizabeth Glaser Scientist for pediatric AIDS 1997
- Scientific career
- Fields: computational biology, molecular biology, population genetics, virology
- Workplaces: Los Alamos National Laboratory, Santa Fe Institute
- Thesis: (1988)
- Doctoral advisor: Leroy Hood, Iwona Stroynowski

Bette Tina Marie Korber is an American computational biologist focusing on the molecular biology and population genetics of the HIV virus that causes infection and eventually AIDS. She has contributed heavily to efforts to obtain an effective HIV vaccine. She created a database at Los Alamos National Laboratory that has enabled her to design novel mosaic HIV vaccines, one of which is currently in human testing in Africa. The database contains thousands of HIV genome sequences and related data.

Korber is a scientist in theoretical biology and biophysics at Los Alamos National Laboratory. She has received the Ernest Orlando Lawrence Award, the Department of Energy's highest award for scientific achievement. She has also received several other awards including the Elizabeth Glaser Award for pediatric AIDS research and the Richard Feynman Award for Innovation.

== Early life and education ==
Bette Korber grew up in Southern California. She earned her B.S. in chemistry in 1981 from California State University, Long Beach, where her father was a sociology professor at Long Beach State College, her mother graduated in nursing, and her sister graduated in journalism. From 1981 to 1988, she was in the graduate program at the California Institute of Technology (Caltech), where she worked with Iwona Stroynowski in Leroy Hood's laboratory, receiving her PhD in chemistry in 1988. Her work focused on regulation of the expression of major histocompatibility complex type 1 genes, producing cell surface proteins that participate in the rejection of tissue transplants, by interferon induced by viral infections.

She then became a postdoctoral fellow with Myron Essex, working on the molecular epidemiology of the AIDS/HIV virus and HTLV-1, the human leukemia virus, at the Harvard School of Public Health until 1990. There, Korber used polymerase chain reaction (PCR) to show both complete and deleted versions of viral genomes in leukemic cells. Her work on these viral partial and complete genomes was influential and widely cited. She became a visiting faculty member at the Santa Fe Institute in 1991, continuing in that position until 2011.

== Research ==
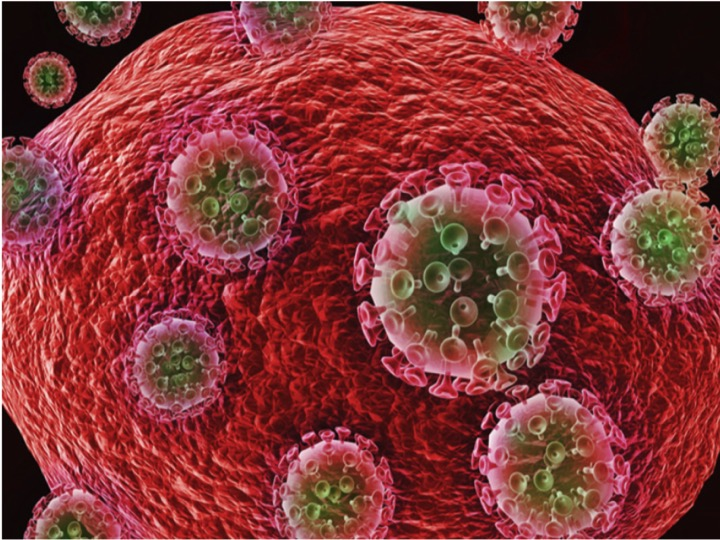
HIV release from infected cell

Korber conducts her research at Los Alamos National Laboratory, where she began in 1990. Her approach involves applying computational biology to the design of a vaccine against the HIV/AIDS virus. She first became interested in HIV when a close friend of hers and her fiancé's at Caltech contracted one of the first cases of AIDS in Pasadena, California. She said, "We learned a lot about HIV while he was sick. But there was no treatment for him and he died in 1991. I decided when I graduated from my PhD program that I wanted to work on HIV." Several years later, looking back on this event, she described its effects: "I hate HIV ... I lost a couple friends to it. HIV kills in horrible ways. I think of what the epidemic has done to Africa and it motivates me."

=== HIV database ===
Phylogenetic tree showing HIV compared to SIV

Korber oversees the HIV Database and Analysis Project at Los Alamos. She and her team have built a global HIV database of more than 840,000 sequences from publications of the viral genome. In addition, the database focuses on the small regions (called epitopes) within the virus that can be recognized by antibodies, and evaluates the evidence for the strength of each epitope in eliciting immune responses. There is also data on the immunological profiles of individuals resistant to HIV. Korber and many other researchers have applied the data to devise possible treatments and vaccines against HIV. Her work has resulted in design of vaccines now being tested in clinical trials.

=== HIV vaccine design ===
Creating a vaccine against HIV has been challenging because the virus mutates rapidly, creating multiple variants that may not be recognized by immune system components specific to the original infecting virus. The most variable region is the surface of the virus, but there is also some variation of the internal proteins involved in virus replication, which may be attacked by the cellular immunity system or T cell responses. A recent approach that Korber and collaborators have taken is to design mosaic antigens. Korber developed a novel mosaic HIV vaccine that may slow or prevent HIV infection; this is currently in human testing in Africa. The goal of the mosaic antigen vaccine is to protect the vaccinated person against the great variety of HIV variants encountered.

Since the proteins of HIV vary so greatly, mosaic test proteins are designed to represent the most common forms of HIV-1 virus that can be recognized by antibodies or cellular immune responses (epitopes). In 2009, Korber described the process: "I create sort of little Frankenstein proteins that look and feel like HIV proteins but they don't exist in nature."

Several of the major variations are included in each molecule of protein, thus producing a variant protein antigen that probably does not exist in the wild virus population but should cross-react with variants that do exist. Korber has taken two different approaches to designing such antigens. Her group has developed a computer algorithm to choose epitopes to combine into a mosaic molecule for the mosaic antigens. In 2009, she described a designed mosaic protein this way: "People didn't know if it would fold properly, if it would be antigenic, or if it would have the same sites that recognized by killer T cells". They found that the newly designed antigens did fold properly and acted as a strong antigen, and were recognized by the cytotoxic T cells (killer cells). Also, Korber and her collaborators have developed a graphical analysis called Epigraph that can generate promising antigens with a mixture of epitopes. Korber explains that the approach of designing a protein via computer, combining bits of known proteins that provoke immune responses, had never been tried. She says, "Even after it worked, it was hard to convince people that this novel thing could be a vaccine because it hadn't been done before".

In collaboration with Dan Barouch, a professor at Harvard Medical School, some of these antigens have been tested in monkeys as possible vaccines. With one series of tests, Barouch checked a number of possible ways to deliver the virus genes and chose to use the common cold virus as a vehicle. The tested mosaic vaccine routinely slowed monkey infection with the closely related Simian Immunodeficiency Virus (SIV), and for 66 percent of monkeys exposed multiple times, no infection resulted. Next, in collaboration with the National Institutes of Health, Janssen Pharmaceutical Companies (a division of Johnson & Johnson), and the Bill and Melinda Gates Foundation, the researchers tested a mosaic vaccine for safety in human subjects; it passed that test too. In 2017, the group of collaborators announced a human efficiency test with that same mosaic protein preparation, vaccinating 2,600 women in Sub Saharan Africa, who will be examined for several years to show how efficiently, if at all, the virus interferes with infection. Korber cautioned that effectiveness of this strategy in monkeys is not a guarantee that a human vaccine will work.

In recognition of her research, Korber received the 2018 Feynman Award for Innovation, the first woman at Los Alamos National Laboratory to receive one. She recalled that at Caltech when few women were there, she took a class with physicist Richard Feynman and became friends with him. She said, "At a time when kindness seemed rare, I really appreciated his generous spirit and encouragement. I think he would have been pleased about this award".

=== Dating the HIV-1 virus ===
In the history of HIV/AIDS virus with regard to when and where HIV originated, Edward Hooper had postulated in a best-selling book called The River: A Journey to the Source of HIV and AIDS in 1999 that HIV could have jumped from chimpanzees to humans because of an accidental contamination by chimpanzee SIV of the oral polio vaccine (CHAT) used in Africa in the 1950s. Korber and her colleagues employed the Los Alamos National Laboratory database's genomic data to calculate when the HIV sequence evolution began, using a model of evolution based on the mutation rate of HIV strains and assuming that variable was the same on all branches of the evolutionary tree. In 2000 they published an estimate of approximately 1930 for the origin of the human immunodeficiency virus. Their research was covered widely as establishing a new date for the origin of the human virus, discrediting the oral polio virus theory, and therefore refuting concerns about using oral polio vaccine (OPV). These two concepts of the origin of this virus plus other related theories continued to compete for scientific credibility.

In 2008, Worobey and collaborators used a computer modeling approach similar to Korber's but with a relaxed evolutionary model and two older samples, collected earlier than any genomes included in Korber's study, and found an origin date for HIV of approximately 1900.

=== COVID-19 ===
As the COVID-19 pandemic unfolded, Korber and her Los Alamos colleagues devised computational strategies that look for evolutionary changes in genes that encode the Spike proteins that stud the SARS-CoV-2 coronavirus and give it its crown-like appearance. Her strategies can examine millions of global genomes stored by GISAID, and it flags mutations that vary from the original Wuhan sequence by at least a minimum specified threshold amount. Using this strategy, she and colleagues identified a particular Spike mutation, Aspartic acid (Asp) to Glycine (Gly) at position 614 (D614G), that was gaining prevalence across the globe since February 2020. This finding, which was controversial at first, was validated by multiple other groups who showed that the D614G mutation was shown to improve the efficiency of replication and transmission of SARS-CoV-2, and this mutation, as of June 2020, has become part of all globally prevalent SARS-CoV-2 strains. As of September 28, 2021, she and her group continue to analyze GISAID data for novel variants, and she continues to be an active member of the NIH TRACE Working Group, whose objective is to "provide actionable intelligence on SARS-CoV-2 variants through genomic surveillance, data sharing and curation, and standardized in vitro assessments of therapeutics against novel strains."

== Personal life ==
Korber married James Theiler in 1988. They have two sons.

Out of her concern for the impact of AIDS on those with few financial resources, Korber contributed $50,000 from her EO Lawrence Award to help establish, along with family and friends, an AIDS orphanage in South Africa, working through Nurturing Orphans of AIDS for Humanity (NOAH). She has joined the Board of NOAH. She also contributed to the distribution of Earth Boxes of maintenance-free portable gardens to orphanages, clinics, and schools in Africa.

== Awards and honors ==
- 2021: Los Alamos Medal, for changing the course of science
- 2019: Inventor of the Year, Battelle, 2019, Award given in Columbus, Ohio
- 2018: R&D Magazine Scientist of the Year
- 2018: Richard Feynman Award for Innovation
- 2014: Selected to Thomson Reuters Corporation's 100 Most Influential Minds of the Decade
- 2004: Ernest Orlando Lawrence Award
- 2002: Los Alamos National Laboratory Fellow
- 2001: Distinguished Alumna of CSULB
- 1997: Elizabeth Glaser Scientist, for work on pediatric AIDS, presented by Hillary Clinton

== Other work ==
In 2019, Korber led a series of lectures called Frontiers in Science that focused on her work designing a vaccine against HIV.

== Selected publications ==
- Korber, Bette; Fischer, Will M.; Gnanakaran, Sandrasegaram; Yoon, Hyejin; Theiler, James; Abfalterer, Werner; Hengartner, Nick; Giorgi, Elena E.; Bhattacharya, Tanmoy; Foley, Brian; Hastie, Kathryn M. (2020-08-20). "Tracking Changes in SARS-CoV-2 Spike: Evidence that D614G Increases Infectivity of the COVID-19 Virus". Cell. 182 (4): 812–827.e19. doi:10.1016/j.cell.2020.06.043. ISSN 0092-8674. PMC 7332439. PMID 32697968.
- Fischer, Will; Giorgi, Elena E.; Chakraborty, Srirupa; Nguyen, Kien; Bhattacharya, Tanmoy; Theiler, James; Goloboff, Pablo A.; Yoon, Hyejin; Abfalterer, Werner; Foley, Brian T.; Tegally, Houriiyah (2021-07-14). "HIV-1 and SARS-CoV-2: Patterns in the evolution of two pandemic pathogens". Cell Host & Microbe. 29 (7): 1093–1110. doi:10.1016/j.chom.2021.05.012. ISSN 1931-3128. PMC 8173590. PMID 34242582.
- Shen, Xiaoying; Tang, Haili; McDanal, Charlene; Wagh, Kshitij; Fischer, William; Theiler, James; Yoon, Hyejin; Li, Dapeng; Haynes, Barton F.; Sanders, Kevin O.; Gnanakaran, Sandrasegaram (2021-04-14). "SARS-CoV-2 variant B.1.1.7 is susceptible to neutralizing antibodies elicited by ancestral spike vaccines". Cell Host & Microbe. 29 (4): 529–539.e3. doi:10.1016/j.chom.2021.03.002. ISSN 1931-3128. PMC 7934674. PMID 33705729.
- Li, Xiaojun; Giorgi, Elena E.; Marichannegowda, Manukumar Honnayakanahalli; Foley, Brian; Xiao, Chuan; Kong, Xiang-Peng; Chen, Yue; Gnanakaran, S.; Korber, Bette; Gao, Feng (2020). "Emergence of SARS-CoV-2 through recombination and strong purifying selection". Science Advances. 6 (27) eabb9153. Bibcode:2020SciA....6.9153L. doi:10.1126/sciadv.abb9153. PMC 7458444. PMID 32937441.
- Rahim, M.N.; Wee, E.G.; He, S.; Audet, J.; Tierney, K.; Moyo, N.; Hannoun, Z.; Crook, A.; Baines, A.; Korber, B.; Qiu, X.; Hanke, T. (2019). "Complete protection of the BALB/c and C57BL/6J mice against Ebola and Marburg virus lethal challenges by pan-filovirus T-cell epigraph vaccine". PLOS Pathogens. 15 (2) e1007564. doi:10.1371/journal.ppat.1007564. PMC 6394903. PMID 30817809.
- Kong, R.; Louder, M. K.; Wagh, K.; Bailer, R. T.; Greene, K.; Gao, H.; Taft, J. D.; Gazumyan, A.; Liu, C.; Nussenzweig, M. C.; Korber, B.; Montefiori, D. C.; Mascola, J. R. (2015). "Improving neutralization potency and breadth by combining broadly reactive HIV-1 antibodies targeting major neutralization epitopes". Journal of Virology. 89 (5): 2659–2671. doi:10.1128/jvi.03136-14. PMC 4325730. PMID 25520506.
- Keele, Brandon F.; Giorgi, Elena E.; Salazar-Gonzalez, Jesus F.; Decker, Julie M.; Pham, Kimmy T.; Salazar, Maria G.; Sun, Chuanxi; Grayson, Truman; Wang, Shuyi; Li, Hui; Wei, Xiping (2008-05-27). "Identification and characterization of transmitted and early founder virus envelopes in primary HIV-1 infection". Proceedings of the National Academy of Sciences. 105 (21): 7552–7557. doi:10.1073/pnas.0802203105. ISSN 0027-8424. PMID 18490657.
- Barouch, D. H.; O'Brien, K. L.; Simmons, N. L.; King, S. L.; Abbink, P.; Maxfield, L. F.; Sun, Y.; La Porte, A.; Riggs, A. M.; Lynch, D. M.; Clark, S. L.; Backus, K.; Perry, J. R.; Seaman, M. S.; Carville, A.; Mansfield, K. G.; Szinger, J. J.; Fischer, W.; Muldoon, M.; Korber, B. (2010). "Mosaic HIV-1 vaccines expand the breadth and depth of cellular immune responses in rhesus monkeys". Nature Medicine. 16 (3): 319–323. doi:10.1038/nm.2089. PMC 2834868. PMID 20173752.
- Barouch, D. H.; Korber, B. (2010). "HIV-1 vaccine development after STEP". Annual Review of Medicine. 61: 153–167. doi:10.1146/annurev.med.042508.093728. PMC 2819364. PMID 20059334.
- Binley, J. M.; Wrin, T.; Korber, B.; Zwick, M. B.; Wang, M.; Chappey, C.; Stiegler, G.; Kunert, R.; Zolla-Pazner, S.; Katinger, H.; Petropoulos, C. J.; Burton, D. R. (2004). "Comprehensive cross-clade neutralization analysis of a panel of anti-human immunodeficiency virus type 1 monoclonal antibodies". Journal of Virology. 78 (23): 13232–13252. doi:10.1128/jvi.78.23.13232-13252.2004. PMC 524984. PMID 15542675.
- Gaschen, B.; Taylor, J.; Yusim, K.; Foley, B.; Gao, F.; Lang, D.; Novitsky, V.; Haynes, B.; Hahn, B. H.; Bhattacharya, T.; Korber, B. (2002). "Diversity considerations in HIV-1 vaccine selection". Science. 296 (5577): 2354–2360. Bibcode:2002Sci...296.2354G. doi:10.1126/science.1070441. PMID 12089434. S2CID 39452987.
- Goulder, P. J. R.; Brander, C.; Yang, Y.; Tremblay, C.; Colbert, R. A.; Addo, M. M.; Rosenberg, E. S.; Nguyen, T.; Allen, R.; Trocha, A.; Altfeld, M.; He, S.; Bunce, M.; Funkhouser, R.; Pelton, S. I.; Burchett, S. K.; McIntosh, K.; Korber, B. T. M.; Walker, B. D. (2001). "Evolution and transmission of stable CTL escape mutations in HIV infection". Nature. 412 (6844): 334–8. Bibcode:2001Natur.412..334G. doi:10.1038/35085576. PMID 11460164. S2CID 4332431.
- Korber, B.; Muldoon, M.; Theiler, J.; Gao, F.; Gupta, R.; Lapedes, A.; Hahn, B. H.; Wolinsky, S.; Bhattacharya, T. (2000). "Timing the ancestor of the HIV-1 pandemic strains". Science. 288 (5472): 1789–1796. Bibcode:2000Sci...288.1789K. doi:10.1126/science.288.5472.1789. PMID 10846155. S2CID 24858072.
- Korber, B. T.; Farber, R. M.; Wolpert, D. H.; Lapedes, A. S. (1993). "Covariation of mutations in the V3 loop of human immunodeficiency virus type 1 envelope protein: an information theoretic analysis". Proceedings of the National Academy of Sciences. 90 (15): 7176–7180. Bibcode:1993PNAS...90.7176K. doi:10.1073/pnas.90.15.7176. PMC 47099. PMID 8346232.
- Korber, B.; Hood, L.; Stroynowski, I. (1987). "Regulation of murine Class I genes by interferons is controlled by regions located both 5' and 3' to the transcription initiation site". Proceedings of the National Academy of Sciences. 84 (10): 3380–3384. Bibcode:1987PNAS...84.3380K. doi:10.1073/pnas.84.10.3380. PMC 304874. PMID 3106967.
