= Charles Yanofsky =

American geneticist (1925–2018)

- Born: April 17, 1925; New York City, New York, U.S.
- Died: March 16, 2018 (aged 92); Palo Alto, California
- Education: City College of New York; Yale University (Ph.D, 1951)
- Known for: data supporting one gene-one enzyme hypothesis, mechanism of suppression, attenuation of expression of bacterial operons
- Awards: National Medal of Science (2003); Passano Award (1992); Thomas Hunt Morgan Medal (1990); Genetics Society of America Medal (1983); Louisa Gross Horwitz Prize (1976); Selman A. Waksman Award in Microbiology (1972); Albert Lasker Award (1971); NAS Award in Molecular Biology (1964); Eli Lilly and Company-Elanco Research Award (1959)
- Scientific career
- Fields: Genetics microbiology
- Workplaces: Stanford University
- Thesis: A study of tryptophan-niacin metabolism in Neurospora (1951)
- Doctoral advisor: David M. Bonner
- Website: profiles.stanford.edu/charles-yanofsky

Charles Yanofsky (April 17, 1925 – March 16, 2018) was an American geneticist on the faculty of Stanford University who contributed to the establishment of the one gene-one enzyme hypothesis and discovered attenuation, a riboswitch mechanism in which messenger RNA changes shape in response to a small molecule and thus alters its binding ability for the regulatory region of a gene or operon.

== Early life and education ==
Charles Yanofsky was born on April 17, 1925, in New York. He was one of the earliest graduates of the Bronx High School of Science, then studied at the City College of New York and completed his degree in biochemistry in spite of having had his education interrupted by military service in World War II including participation in the Battle of the Bulge. In 1948, having returned and completed college, he took up graduate work towards his master's degree and Ph.D., both granted by Yale University under the supervision of David M. Bonner. His doctoral dissertation, A study of tryptophan-niacin metabolism in Neurospora, examined amino acid biosynthesis in fungi. He pursued postdoctoral work at Yale for a time, completing work started during his Ph.D. training.

== Career and research ==
Yanofsky joined the Case Western Reserve Medical School faculty in 1954. He moved to the faculty at Stanford University as an associate professor in 1958. In 1964, Yanofsky and colleagues established that gene sequences and protein sequences are colinear in bacteria. Yanofsky showed that changes in DNA sequence can produce changes in protein sequence at corresponding positions. His work is considered the best evidence in favor of the one gene-one enzyme hypothesis.

His graduate student Iwona Stroynowski and Mitzi Kuroda discovered the process of attenuation of expression based on regulated binding ability of the five-prime untranslated region of the messenger RNA for the bacterial tryptophan operon. They had thus discovered the first regulatory riboswitch, although that terminology was not used until later. Yanofsky and his other collaborators then extended this work showing how mRNAs responded allosterically to a small molecule signal by changing shape and therefore changing ability to bind to the regulatory region of each operon. They showed that this mechanism applied to other amino acid biosynthesis and degradation operons of bacteria and to animal cell genes.

In 1980, Yanofsky and other Stanford scientists founded DNAX, a Palo Alto–based research institute subsequently acquired by Schering-Plough.

Yanofsky died in Palo Alto, California. At the time of death, he was the Morris Herzstein Professor of Biology and Molecular Biology (Emeritus) in the Department of Biology at Stanford University.

== Personal life ==
Charles Yanofsky's first wife Carol died of breast cancer in 1990. He was survived by his second wife, Edna, and three sons, including Martin F. Yanofsky, a plant biologist elected to the National Academy of Sciences and the American Academy of Arts and Sciences.

== Awards and honors ==
Charles Yanofsky received the Albert Lasker Basic Medical Research Award, sometimes referred to as the American Nobel prize, in 1971. Yanofsky was awarded the Selman A. Waksman Award in Microbiology from the National Academy of Sciences in 1972 and was co-recipient of the Louisa Gross Horwitz Prize from Columbia University in 1976 with Seymour Benzer. Yanofsky was elected a foreign member of the Royal Society in 1985 and was one of the recipients of the 2003 National Medal of Science awards.

== Major publications ==
- Yanofsky, Charles (2007), "RNA-based regulation of genes of tryptophan synthesis and degradation, in bacteria", RNA, vol. 13, no. 8 (published August 2007), pp. 1141–54, doi:10.1261/rna.620507, PMC 1924887, PMID 17601995
- Yanofsky, Charles (2005), "The Favorable Features of Tryptophan Synthase for Proving Beadle and Tatum's One Gene–One Enzyme Hypothesis", Genetics, vol. 169, no. 2 (published February 2005), pp. 511–6, doi:10.1093/genetics/169.2.511, PMC 1449131, PMID 15731515
- Yanofsky, Charles (2004), "The different roles of tryptophan transfer RNA in regulating trp operon expression in E. coli versus B. subtilis", Trends Genet., vol. 20, no. 8 (published August 2004), pp. 367–74, doi:10.1016/j.tig.2004.06.007, PMID 15262409
- Yanofsky, C (2000), "Transcription Attenuation: Once Viewed as a Novel Regulatory Strategy", J. Bacteriol., vol. 182, no. 1 (published January 2000), pp. 1–8, doi:10.1128/JB.182.1.1-8.2000, PMC 94232, PMID 10613855
- Yanofsky, C; Konan, K V; Sarsero, J P (1996), "Some novel transcription attenuation mechanisms used by bacteria", Biochimie, vol. 78, no. 11–12, pp. 1017–24, doi:10.1016/S0300-9084(97)86725-9, PMID 9150880
- Yanofsky, C (1988), "Transcription attenuation", J. Biol. Chem., vol. 263, no. 2 (published January 15, 1988), pp. 609–12, PMID 3275656
- Yanofsky, C; Platt, T; Crawford, I P; Nichols, B P; Christie, GE; Horowitz, H; Vancleemput, M; Wu, AM (1981), "The complete nucleotide sequence of the tryptophan operon of Escherichia coli", Nucleic Acids Res., vol. 9, no. 24 (published December 21, 1981), pp. 6647–68, doi:10.1093/nar/9.24.6647, PMC 327632, PMID 7038627
- Yanofsky, C (1981), "Attenuation in the control of expression of bacterial operons", Nature, vol. 289, no. 5800 (published February 26, 1981), pp. 751–8, Bibcode:1981Natur.289..751Y, doi:10.1038/289751a0, PMID 7007895, S2CID 4364204
- Yanofsky, C (1971), "Tryptophan biosynthesis in Escherichia coli. Genetic determination of the proteins involved", JAMA, vol. 218, no. 7 (published November 15, 1971), pp. 1026–35, doi:10.1001/jama.218.7.1026, PMID 4940311
- Yanofsky, C (1967), "Gene structure and protein structure", Harvey Lect., vol. 61, pp. 145–68, PMID 5338072
