= David M. Bonner =

American biochemical geneticist (1916–1964)

- Born: David Mahlon Bonner; May 15, 1916; Salt Lake City, Utah, U.S.
- Died: May 2, 1964 (aged 47)
- Education: University of Utah; California Institute of Technology
- Known for: Work on Neurospora crassa and biochemical genetics
- Awards: Eli Lilly Award in Biological Chemistry (1952); National Academy of Sciences (1959)
- Scientific career
- Fields: Biochemical genetics
- Workplaces: Yale University; University of California, San Diego
- Doctoral advisor: Arie Jan Haagen-Smit

David Mahlon Bonner (May 15, 1916 – May 2, 1964) was an American biochemical geneticist known for his work on the genetics of metabolism using the fungus Neurospora crassa. He was among the early contributors to the development of biochemical genetics and played a role in research associated with the "one gene, one enzyme" hypothesis.

== Early life and education ==
Bonner was born in Salt Lake City, Utah, the fourth of seven children. Several of his siblings went on to scientific careers; five earned doctoral degrees, with careers spanning biochemistry, physical chemistry, and applied mathematics. His father, Walter D. Bonner, was a chemist and head of the chemistry department at the University of Utah, known for his work as a teacher and scholar. His mother, Grace Gaylord Bonner, also studied chemistry.

In 1929, when Bonner was 13, his father took a sabbatical at the California Institute of Technology, and several members of the family spent a year in Pasadena. During this period, his older brothers attended Caltech, and his eldest brother James F. Bonner worked as a research assistant to Theodosius Dobzhansky, providing early exposure to leading figures in genetics. His older brother James also became a plant biologist and was later elected to the National Academy of Sciences for his work in plant biology.

== Career and research ==
Bonner began his research career in plant physiology, studying plant growth factors during his doctoral work. In 1942 he joined the group of George Beadle and Edward Tatum at Stanford University, where he shifted to microbial systems and began working with Neurospora. Using auxotrophic mutants of Neurospora, Bonner helped identify steps in biochemical pathways, including those involved in niacin biosynthesis. His work contributed to experimental support for the idea that genes control specific enzymatic functions.

In 1946 Bonner joined Yale University, where he rose through the ranks to become professor of microbiology. At Yale he established a research group that continued work on gene–enzyme relationships and on the biochemical genetics of tryptophan metabolism. Among his studies were investigations of intermediates such as quinolinic acid and kynurenine in metabolic pathways, with his graduate student Charles Yanofsky.

In 1960 Bonner moved to the University of California, San Diego at the invitation of Roger Revelle as the founding chair of the Department of Biology, bringing members of his laboratory and colleagues from Yale University, including the biochemist S. Jonathan Singer. He played a central role in shaping the early organization of the biological sciences on the new campus, promoting a model that emphasized molecular and cellular biology and close integration with chemistry and medicine. Bonner advocated a unified structure in which biochemists were appointed across departments rather than housed in a separate biochemistry department, and helped establish a collaborative environment linking biology with the emerging medical school.

== Personal life and death ==
Bonner married Miriam Thatcher in 1941, and they had two sons. He was diagnosed with Hodgkin's lymphoma in 1952 and died from the disease on May 2, 1964, at the age of 48.

== Honors and legacy ==
Bonner received the Eli Lilly Award in Biological Chemistry in 1952 for his work on metabolic pathways and gene function; in 1959 he was elected to the National Academy of Science.

Following his death in 1964, the University of California, San Diego named its first biology building David Mahlon Bonner Hall in his honor.

== Publications ==
Bonner co-authored the textbook Heredity with Stanley E. Mills, published in 1964.
