= Stephen Elledge =

American geneticist

Stephen Joseph Elledge
- Born: August 7, 1956 (age 70); Paris, Illinois
- Education: University of Illinois Urbana-Champaign (BSc); Massachusetts Institute of Technology (PhD)
- Known for: Cell cycle research DNA repair research
- Spouse: Mitzi Kuroda
- Awards: NAS Award in Molecular Biology; Breakthrough Prize in Life Sciences; Genetics Society of America Medal; Dickson Prize; Canada Gairdner International Award; Albert Lasker Award for Basic Medical Research; Gruber Prize in Genetics
- Scientific career
- Fields: Genetics; Molecular biology
- Workplaces: Harvard University; Brigham and Women's Hospital; Baylor College of Medicine; Howard Hughes Medical Institute; Stanford University
- Thesis: Identification and characterization of genes involved in mutagenesis in Escherichia coli (1983)
- Doctoral advisor: Graham C. Walker

Stephen Joseph Elledge (born August 7, 1956) is an American geneticist. He is the current Gregor Mendel Professor of Genetics and of Medicine at the Department of Genetics of Harvard Medical School and in the Division of Genetics of the Brigham and Women's Hospital. His research is focused on the genetic and molecular mechanisms of eukaryotic response to DNA damage and is known as the discoverer of the DNA damage response (DDR).

== Early life and education ==
Elledge was born in Paris, Illinois in 1956. He also grew in up, graduating from Paris High School in 1974. He has been interested in chemistry since childhood, thanks to a chemistry set his grandmother gave him.

He entered the University of Illinois Urbana-Champaign, majoring in chemistry and hoping to become an organic chemist. Elledge initially ignored life science subjects, until he attended biology and genetics courses on exchange to the University of Southampton, England, during his third (or junior) year. He took biochemistry courses after returning to Illinois, which prompted him to study PhD in biology at the Massachusetts Institute of Technology (MIT) after obtaining his BSc in 1978. Elledge graduated from MIT in 1983.

== Career ==
Elledge started his career as a postdoctoral fellow at Stanford University in 1984 in Ronald W. Davis's group. In 1989, he moved to the Baylor College of Medicine as an assistant professor in biochemistry, He was promoted to associate professor in 1993 and full professor in 1995.

In 2003, Elledge joined the Department of Genetics of Harvard Medical School.

Currently, Elledge is the Gregor Mendel Professor of Genetics and of Medicine at the Department of Genetics of Harvard Medical School and in the Division of Genetics of the Brigham and Women's Hospital. He also sits on the Board of Advisory Scientists of the Whitehead Institute and the advisory board of Molecular Cell.

Elledge has been an investigator at the Howard Hughes Medical Institute since 1993.

== Research ==
Elledge's research spans multiple areas, including cell cycle, DNA repair, and detection of virus from blood.

He began studying DNA repair during his years at Stanford University as a postdoctoral fellow. Elledge accidentally discovered the RNR2 gene and protein in yeast, which belongs to the family of ribonucleotide reductase, and found that its expression increases when DNA is damaged. The human counterparts of RNR2, or homologs, are RRM2 and RRM2B.

Over the next decade, he continued the search for genes and proteins involved in the DNA damage response pathway in yeasts and humans. Examples include DUN1, MEC1, and TEL1 in yeasts, (respective human homologs are CHEK2, ATR, and ATM) and CHEK1 and CHEK2 in humans.

In cell cycle research, his group published two important papers on cell cycle checkpoints in 1993. In parallel and independently from Bert Vogelstein's group, he discovered and characterized p21, a cyclin-dependent kinase inhibitor protein that blocks G1/S transition. He also showed that the Rb protein physically associates with PP1a from mitosis until mid-G1 phase in yeasts. After moving to the Baylor College of Medicine, Elledge reported his identification of CDK2, a protein whose activation allows cells to transit from the G1 phase into the S phase of the cell cycle.

Elledge's group also discovered the F-box protein structural motif, and found that it recognizes specific protein sequences and tags the proteins with ubiquitin for degradation. He correctly predicted the central role of F-Box in protein degradation due to the large number of proteins having this motif.

In 2015, Elledge's group developed VirScan, a platform that detects viral infection in patients from a small amount of blood. In 2020, this was commercialised by CDI Labs.

In recent years, Elledge has continued to expand his research area. For instance, his group reported a computational model that predicted the likelihood of regions on the chromosome to be abnormally amplified.

During the COVID-19 pandemic, Elledge estimated that United States has lost a total of 2.5 million years of life.

== Personal life ==
Elledge was married to Mitzi Kuroda, herself a professor at the Department of Genetics at Harvard Medical School. They both moved from Baylor College of Medicine to Harvard Medical School in 2003.

== Awards ==
- Paul Marks Prize for Cancer Research (2001)
- National Academy of Sciences Award in Molecular Biology (2002)
- Member of the National Academy of Sciences (2003)
- Member of the American Academy of Arts and Sciences (2003)
- Hans Sigrist Prize (2005)
- Genetics Society of America Medal (2005)
- Fellow of the American Academy of Microbiology (2005)
- Member of the Institute of Medicine) (now National Academy of Medicine) (2006)
- Dickson Prize (2010)
- Lewis S. Rosenstiel Award (2012)
- Canada Gairdner International Award (2013)
- Fellow of the American Association for Cancer Research Academy (2014)
- Albert Lasker Award for Basic Medical Research (2015)
- Breakthrough Prize in Life Sciences (2017)
- Gruber Prize in Genetics (2017)
- Alumni Award, University of Illinois Alumni Association (2017)
- Fellow of the American Association for the Advancement of Science (2018)
