= Rhenium =

Rhenium, _{75}Re
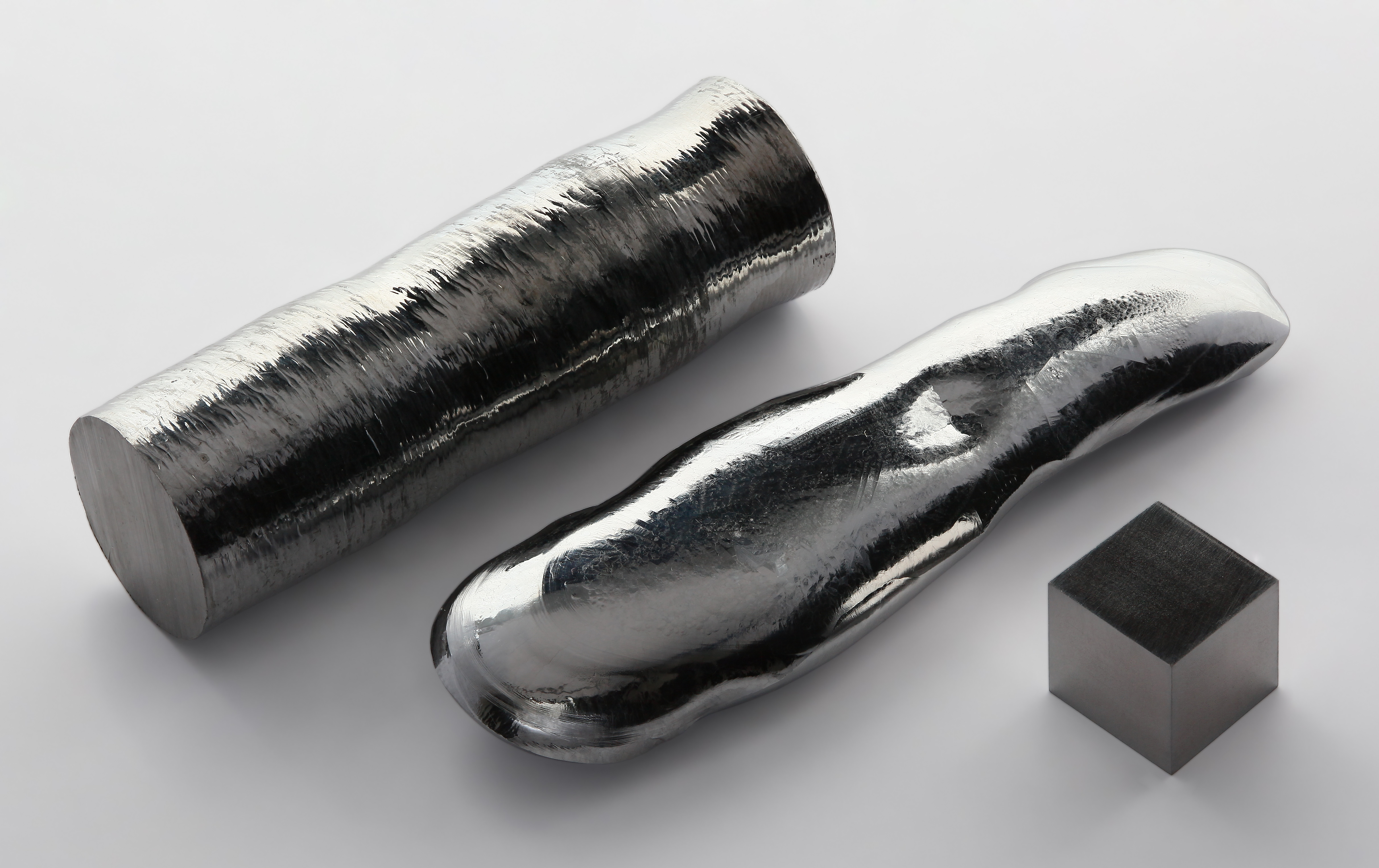

Rhenium
- Pronunciation: /ˈriːniəm/ (REE-nee-əm)
- Appearance: silvery-grayish

Standard atomic weight A_{r}°(Re)
- 186.207±0.001; 186.21±0.01 (abridged)

Rhenium in the periodic table
Hydrogen																															Helium
Lithium	Beryllium																									Boron	Carbon	Nitrogen	Oxygen	Fluorine	Neon
Sodium	Magnesium																									Aluminium	Silicon	Phosphorus	Sulfur	Chlorine	Argon
Potassium	Calcium															Scandium	Titanium	Vanadium	Chromium	Manganese	Iron	Cobalt	Nickel	Copper	Zinc	Gallium	Germanium	Arsenic	Selenium	Bromine	Krypton
Rubidium	Strontium															Yttrium	Zirconium	Niobium	Molybdenum	Technetium	Ruthenium	Rhodium	Palladium	Silver	Cadmium	Indium	Tin	Antimony	Tellurium	Iodine	Xenon
Caesium	Barium	Lanthanum	Cerium	Praseodymium	Neodymium	Promethium	Samarium	Europium	Gadolinium	Terbium	Dysprosium	Holmium	Erbium	Thulium	Ytterbium	Lutetium	Hafnium	Tantalum	Tungsten	Rhenium	Osmium	Iridium	Platinum	Gold	Mercury (element)	Thallium	Lead	Bismuth	Polonium	Astatine	Radon
Francium	Radium	Actinium	Thorium	Protactinium	Uranium	Neptunium	Plutonium	Americium	Curium	Berkelium	Californium	Einsteinium	Fermium	Mendelevium	Nobelium	Lawrencium	Rutherfordium	Dubnium	Seaborgium	Bohrium	Hassium	Meitnerium	Darmstadtium	Roentgenium	Copernicium	Nihonium	Flerovium	Moscovium	Livermorium	Tennessine	Oganesson
Tc
↑
Re
↓
Bh
tungsten ← rhenium → osmium
- Atomic number (Z): 75
- Group: group 7
- Period: period 6
- Block: d-block
- Electron configuration: [Xe] 4f^{14} 5d^{5} 6s^{2}
- Electrons per shell: 2, 8, 18, 32, 13, 2

Physical properties
- Phase at STP: solid
- Melting point: 3459 K (3186 °C, 5767 °F)
- Boiling point: 5903 K (5630 °C, 10,170 °F)
- Density (at 20° C): 21.010 g/cm^{3}
- when liquid (at m.p.): 18.9 g/cm^{3}
- Heat of fusion: 60.43 kJ/mol
- Heat of vaporization: 704 kJ/mol
- Molar heat capacity: 25.48 J/(mol·K)
- Specific heat capacity: 136.835 J/(kg·K)
Vapor pressure
P (Pa)	1	10	100	1 k	10 k	100 k
at T (K)	3303	3614	4009	4500	5127	5954

Atomic properties
- Oxidation states: common: +4, +7 −3, −1, 0, +1, +2, +3, +5, +6
- Electronegativity: Pauling scale: 1.9
- Ionization energies: 1st: 760 kJ/mol; 2nd: 1260 kJ/mol; 3rd: 2510 kJ/mol; (more)
- Atomic radius: empirical: 137 pm
- Covalent radius: 151±7 pm
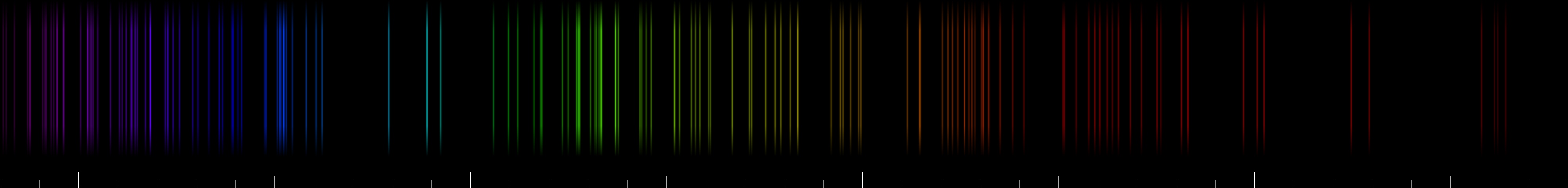
- Spectral lines of rhenium

Other properties
- Natural occurrence: primordial
- Crystal structure: hexagonal close-packed (hcp) (hP2)
- Lattice constants: a = 276.10 pm c = 445.84 pm (at 20 °C)
- Thermal expansion: 5.61×10^{−6}/K (at 20 °C) (Note: The thermal expansion of Rh is anisotropic: the parameters for each crystal axis (at 20 °C) are α_{a} = 6.07×10^{−6}/K, α_{c} = 4.69×10^{−6}/K, and α_{average} = α_{V}/3 = 5.61×10^{−6}/K.)
- Thermal conductivity: 48.0 W/(m⋅K)
- Electrical resistivity: 193 nΩ⋅m (at 20 °C)
- Magnetic ordering: paramagnetic
- Molar magnetic susceptibility: +67.6×10^{−6} cm^{3}/mol (293 K)
- Young's modulus: 463 GPa
- Shear modulus: 178 GPa
- Bulk modulus: 370 GPa
- Speed of sound thin rod: 4700 m/s (at 20 °C)
- Poisson ratio: 0.30
- Mohs hardness: 7.0
- Vickers hardness: 1350–7850 MPa
- Brinell hardness: 1320–2500 MPa
- CAS Number: 7440-15-5

History
- Naming: after the river Rhine (German: Rhein)
- Discovery: Masataka Ogawa (1908)
- First isolation: Masataka Ogawa (1919)
- Named by: Walter Noddack, Ida Noddack, Otto Berg (1925)

Isotopes of rhenium
Main isotopes			Decay	
Isotope	abundance	half-life (t_{1/2})	mode	product
^{183}Re	synth	70 d	ε	^{183}W
^{184}Re	syn	35.4 d	β^{+}	^{184}W
^{184m}Re	syn	177.25 d	IT	^{184}Re
^{184m}Re	syn	177.25 d	β^{+}	^{184}W
^{185}Re	37.4%	stable		
^{186}Re	syn	3.7185 d	β^{−}	^{186}Os
^{186}Re	syn	3.7185 d	ε	^{186}W
^{186m}Re	syn	2×10^{5} y	IT	^{186}Re
^{187}Re	62.6%	4.16×10^{10} y	β^{−}	^{187}Os

Rhenium is a chemical element; it has symbol Re and atomic number 75. It is a silvery-gray, heavy, third-row transition metal in group 7 of the periodic table. With an estimated average concentration of 1 part per billion (ppb), rhenium is one of the rarest elements in the Earth's crust. It has one of the highest melting and boiling points of any element. It resembles manganese and technetium chemically and is mainly obtained as a by-product of the extraction and refinement of molybdenum and copper ores. It can assume a wide variety of oxidation states ranging from −3 to +7.

Rhenium was originally discovered in 1908 by Masataka Ogawa, but he mistakenly assigned it as element 43 (now known as technetium) rather than element 75 and named it nipponium. It was rediscovered in 1925 by Walter Noddack, Ida Tacke and Otto Berg, who gave it its present name. It was named after the river Rhine in Europe, from which the earliest samples had been obtained and worked commercially.

Nickel-based superalloys of rhenium are used in combustion chambers, turbine blades, and exhaust nozzles of jet engines. These alloys contain up to 6 % rhenium, making jet engine construction the largest single use for the element. The second-most important use is as a catalyst: it is an excellent catalyst for hydrogenation and isomerization, and is used for example in catalytic reforming of naphtha for use in gasoline (rheniforming process). Because of the low availability relative to demand, rhenium is expensive, with price reaching an all-time high in 2008–09 of US$10,600 per kilogram (US$4,800 per pound). As of 2018, its price had dropped to US$2,844 per kilogram (US$1,290 per pound) due to increased recycling and a drop in demand for rhenium catalysts.

== History ==
In 1908, Japanese chemist Masataka Ogawa announced that he had discovered the 43rd element and named it nipponium (Np) after Japan (Nippon in Japanese). In fact, he had found element 75 (rhenium) instead of element 43: both elements are in the same group of the periodic table. Ogawa's work was often incorrectly cited, because some of his key results were published only in Japanese; it is likely that his insistence on searching for element 43 prevented him from considering that he might have found element 75 instead. Just before Ogawa's death in 1930, Kenjiro Kimura analysed Ogawa's sample by X-ray spectroscopy at the Imperial University of Tokyo, and said to a friend that "it was beautiful rhenium indeed". He did not reveal this publicly, because under the Japanese university culture before World War II it was frowned upon to point out the mistakes of one's seniors, but the evidence became known to some Japanese news media regardless. As time passed with no repetitions of the experiments or new work on nipponium, Ogawa's claim faded away. The symbol Np was later used for the element neptunium, and the name "nihonium", also named after Japan, along with symbol Nh, was later used for element 113. Element 113 was also discovered by a team of Japanese scientists and was named in respectful homage to Ogawa's work. Today, Ogawa's claim is widely accepted as having been the discovery of element 75 in hindsight.

Rhenium (Latin: Rhenus meaning: "Rhine") received its current name when it was rediscovered by Walter Noddack, Ida Noddack, and Otto Berg in Germany. In 1925 they reported that they had detected the element in platinum ore and in the mineral columbite. They also found rhenium in gadolinite and molybdenite. In 1928 they were able to extract 1 g of the element by processing 660 kg of molybdenite. It was estimated in 1968 that 75 % of the rhenium metal in the United States was used for research and the development of refractory metal alloys. It took several years from that point before the superalloys became widely used.

The original mischaracterization by Ogawa in 1908 and final work in 1925 makes rhenium perhaps the last stable element to be understood. Hafnium was discovered in 1923 and all other new elements discovered since then do not have stable isotopes.

== Characteristics ==
Rhenium is a silvery-white metal with one of the highest melting points of all elements, exceeded by only tungsten (at standard pressure carbon sublimes rather than melts, though its sublimation point is comparable to the melting points of tungsten and rhenium). It also has one of the highest boiling points of all elements, and the highest among stable elements. It is also one of the densest, exceeded only by platinum, iridium, and osmium. Rhenium has a hexagonal close-packed crystal structure.

Its usual commercial form is a powder, but this element can be consolidated by pressing and sintering in a vacuum or hydrogen atmosphere. This procedure yields a compact solid having a density above 90 % of the density of the metal. When annealed this metal is very ductile and can be bent, coiled, or rolled. Rhenium-molybdenum alloys are superconductive at 10 K; tungsten-rhenium alloys are also superconductive around 4–8 K, depending on the alloy. Rhenium metal superconducts at 1.697±0.006 K.

In bulk form and at room temperature and atmospheric pressure, the element resists alkalis, sulfuric acid, hydrochloric acid, nitric acid, and aqua regia. It will however, react with nitric acid upon heating.

=== Isotopes ===
Rhenium has one stable isotope, rhenium-185, which nevertheless occurs in minority abundance, a situation found only in two other elements (indium and tellurium). Naturally occurring rhenium is only 37.4 % ^{185}Re, and 62.6 % ^{187}Re, which is unstable but has a very long half-life (41.6 billion years). A kilogram of natural rhenium emits 1.07 MBq of radiation due to the presence of this isotope. This lifetime can be greatly affected by the charge state of the rhenium atom. The beta decay of ^{187}Re is used for rhenium–osmium dating of ores. The available energy for this beta decay (2.6 keV) is the second lowest known among all radionuclides, only behind the decay from ^{115}In to excited ^{115}Sn* (0.147 keV). The isotope rhenium-186m is notable as being one of the longest lived metastable isotopes with a half-life of around 200,000 years. There are 33 other unstable isotopes that have been recognized, ranging from ^{160}Re to ^{194}Re, the longest-lived of which is ^{183}Re with a half-life of 70 days.

=== Compounds ===
Rhenium compounds are known for all the oxidation states between −3 and +7 except −2. The oxidation states +7, +4, and +3 are the most common. Rhenium is most available commercially as salts of perrhenate, including sodium and ammonium perrhenates. These are white, water-soluble compounds. Tetrathioperrhenate anion ReS_{4}^{−} is possible.

==== Halides and oxyhalides ====
The most common rhenium chlorides are ReCl_{6}, ReCl_{5}, ReCl_{4}, and ReCl_{3}. The structures of these compounds often feature extensive Re-Re bonding, which is characteristic of this metal in oxidation states lower than VII. Salts of Re_{2}Cl_{8}^{2−} feature a quadruple metal-metal bond. Although the highest rhenium chloride features Re(VI), fluorine gives the d^{0} Re(VII) derivative rhenium heptafluoride. Bromides and iodides of rhenium are also well known, including rhenium pentabromide and rhenium tetraiodide.

Like tungsten and molybdenum, with which it shares chemical similarities, rhenium forms a variety of oxyhalides. The oxychlorides are most common, and include ReOCl_{4}, ReOCl_{3}.

==== Oxides and sulfides ====
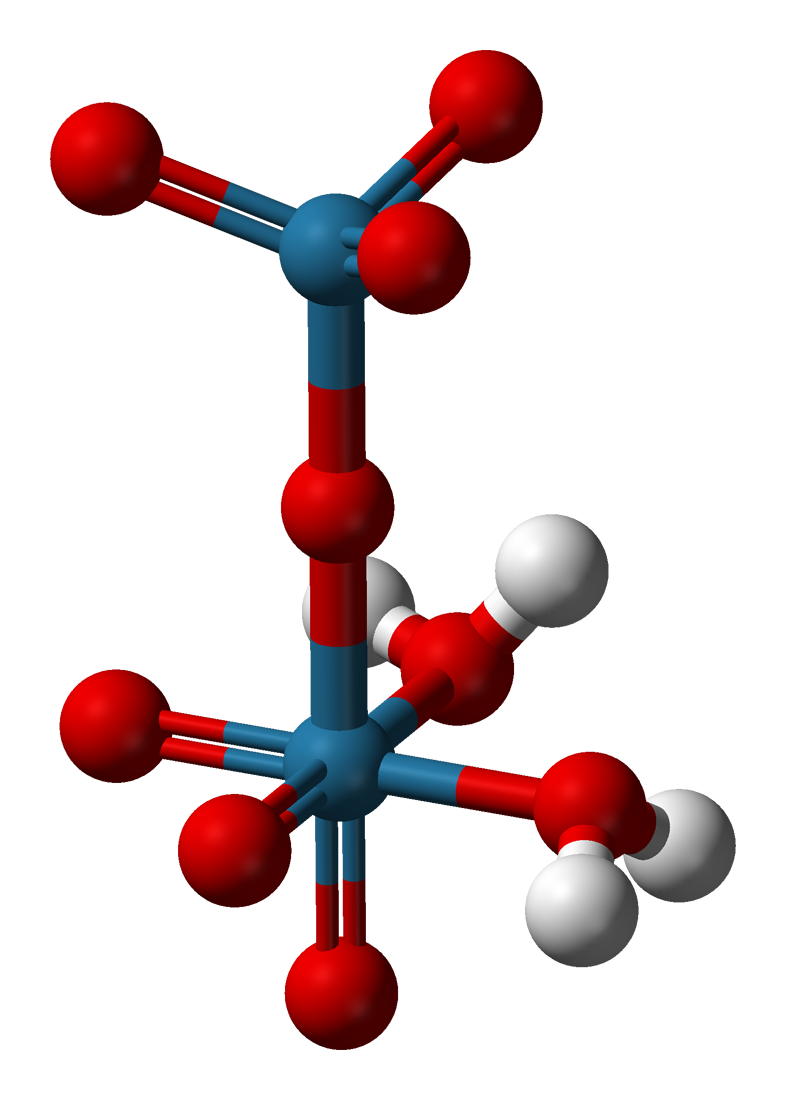
Perrhenic acid (H_{4}Re_{2}O_{9}) adopts an unconventional structure.

The most common oxide is the volatile yellow Re_{2}O_{7}. The red ReO_{3} adopts a perovskite-like structure. Other oxides include Re_{2}O_{5}, ReO_{2}, and Re_{2}O_{3}. The sulfides are ReS_{2} and Re_{2}S_{7}. Perrhenate salts can be converted to tetrathioperrhenate by the action of ammonium hydrosulfide.

==== Other compounds ====
Rhenium diboride (ReB_{2}) is a hard compound having a hardness similar to that of tungsten carbide, silicon carbide, titanium diboride or zirconium diboride.

==== Organorhenium compounds ====
Dirhenium decacarbonyl is the most common entry to organorhenium chemistry. Its reduction with sodium amalgam gives NaRe(CO)_{5} with rhenium in the formal oxidation state −1. Dirhenium decacarbonyl can be oxidised with bromine to bromopentacarbonylrhenium(I):

Re_{2}(CO)_{10} + Br_{2} → 2 Re(CO)_{5}Br

Reduction of this pentacarbonyl with zinc and acetic acid gives pentacarbonylhydridorhenium:

Re(CO)_{5}Br + Zn + HOAc → Re(CO)_{5}H + ZnBr(OAc)

Methylrhenium trioxide ("MTO"), CH_{3}ReO_{3} is a volatile, colourless solid that has been used as a catalyst in some laboratory experiments. It can be prepared by many routes, a typical method is the reaction of Re_{2}O_{7} and tetramethyltin:

Re_{2}O_{7} + (CH_{3})_{4}Sn → CH_{3}ReO_{3} + (CH_{3})_{3}SnOReO_{3}

Analogous alkyl and aryl derivatives are known. MTO catalyses for the oxidations with hydrogen peroxide. Terminal alkynes yield the corresponding acid or ester, internal alkynes yield diketones, and alkenes give epoxides. MTO also catalyses the conversion of aldehydes and diazoalkanes into an alkene.

==== Nonahydridorhenate ====
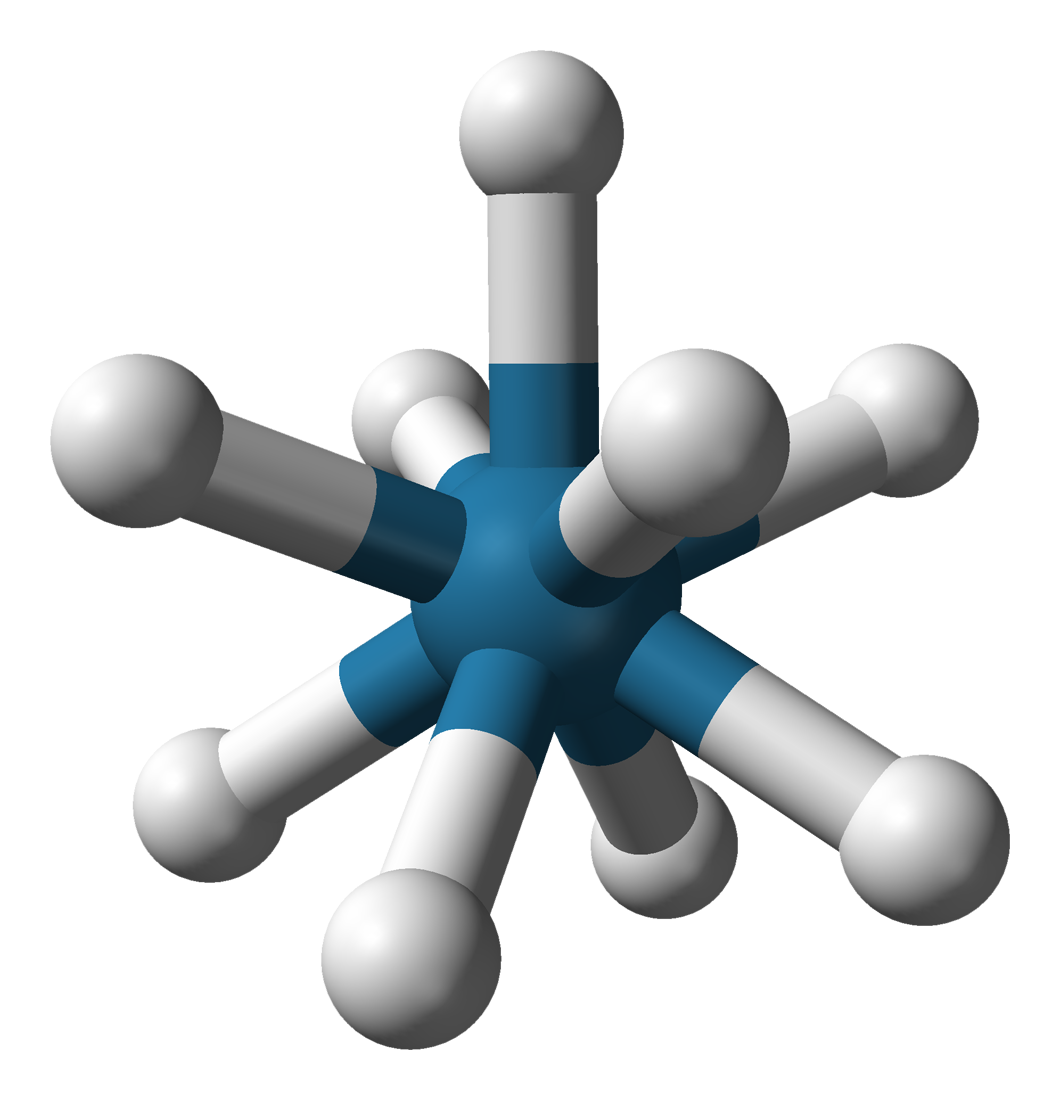
Structure of ReH^{2−}_{9}.

A distinctive derivative of rhenium is nonahydridorhenate, originally thought to be the rhenide anion, Re^{−}, but actually containing the ReH_{9}^{2−} anion in which the oxidation state of rhenium is +7.

=== Occurrence ===
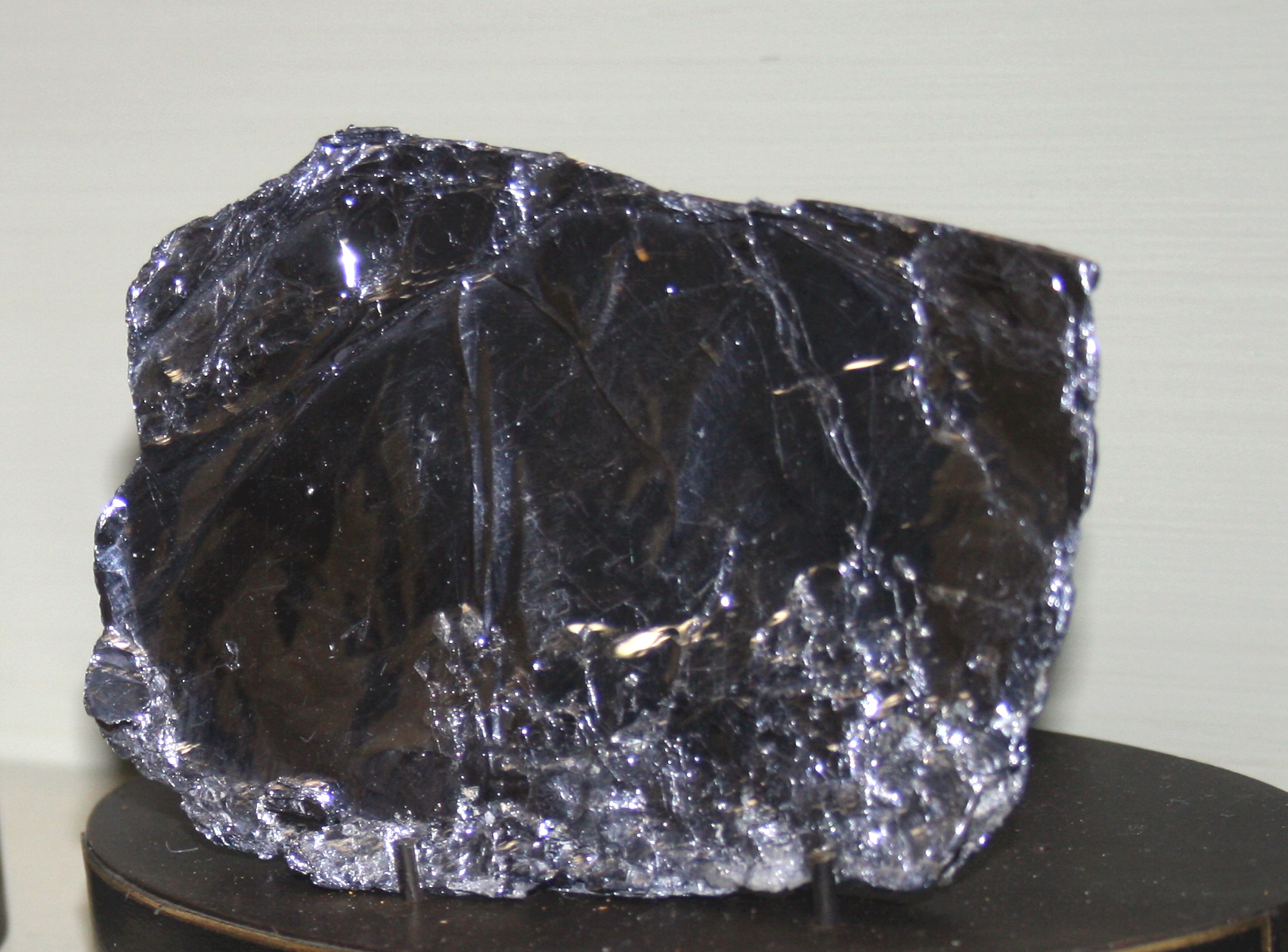
Molybdenite

Rhenium is one of the rarest elements in Earth's crust with an average concentration of 1 ppb; other sources quote the number of 0.5 ppb making it the 77th most abundant element in Earth's crust. Rhenium is probably not found free in nature (its possible natural occurrence is uncertain), but occurs in amounts up to 0.2 % in the mineral molybdenite (which is primarily molybdenum disulfide), the major commercial source, although single molybdenite samples with up to 1.88 % have been found. Chile has the world's largest rhenium reserves, part of the copper ore deposits, and was the leading producer as of 2005. A pure rhenium sulfide mineral, (ReS_{2}), condensing from a fumarole on Kudriavy volcano, Iturup island, in the Kuril Islands was discovered in 2004. Kudriavy discharges up to 20–60 kg rhenium per year mostly in the form of rhenium disulfide. Named rheniite, this rare mineral commands high prices among collectors.

== Production ==
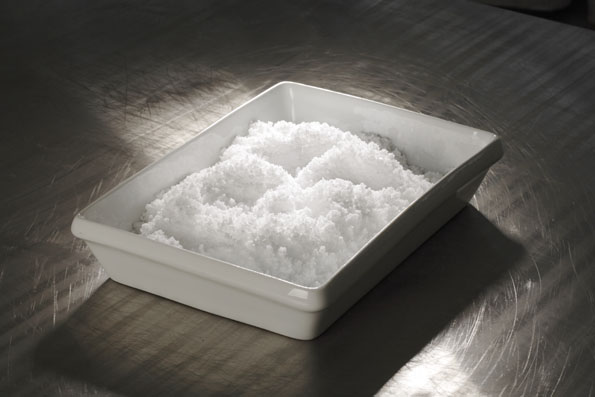
Ammonium perrhenate

Approximately 80 % of rhenium is extracted from porphyry molybdenum deposits. Some ores contain 0.001 % to 0.2 % rhenium. Roasting the ore volatilizes rhenium oxides. Rhenium(VII) oxide and perrhenic acid readily dissolve in water; they are leached from flue dusts and gasses and extracted by precipitating with potassium or ammonium chloride as the perrhenate salts, and purified by recrystallization. Total world production is between 40 and 50 tons/year; the main producers are in Chile, the United States, Peru, and Poland. Recycling of used Pt-Re catalyst and special alloys allow the recovery of another 10 tons per year. Prices for the metal rose rapidly in early 2008, from $1000–$2000 per kg in 2003–2006 to over $10,000 in February 2008. The metal form is prepared by reducing ammonium perrhenate with hydrogen at high temperatures:

2 NH_{4}ReO_{4} + 7 H_{2} → 2 Re + 8 H_{2}O + 2 NH_{3}

There are technologies for the associated extraction of rhenium from productive solutions of underground leaching of uranium ores.

== Applications ==
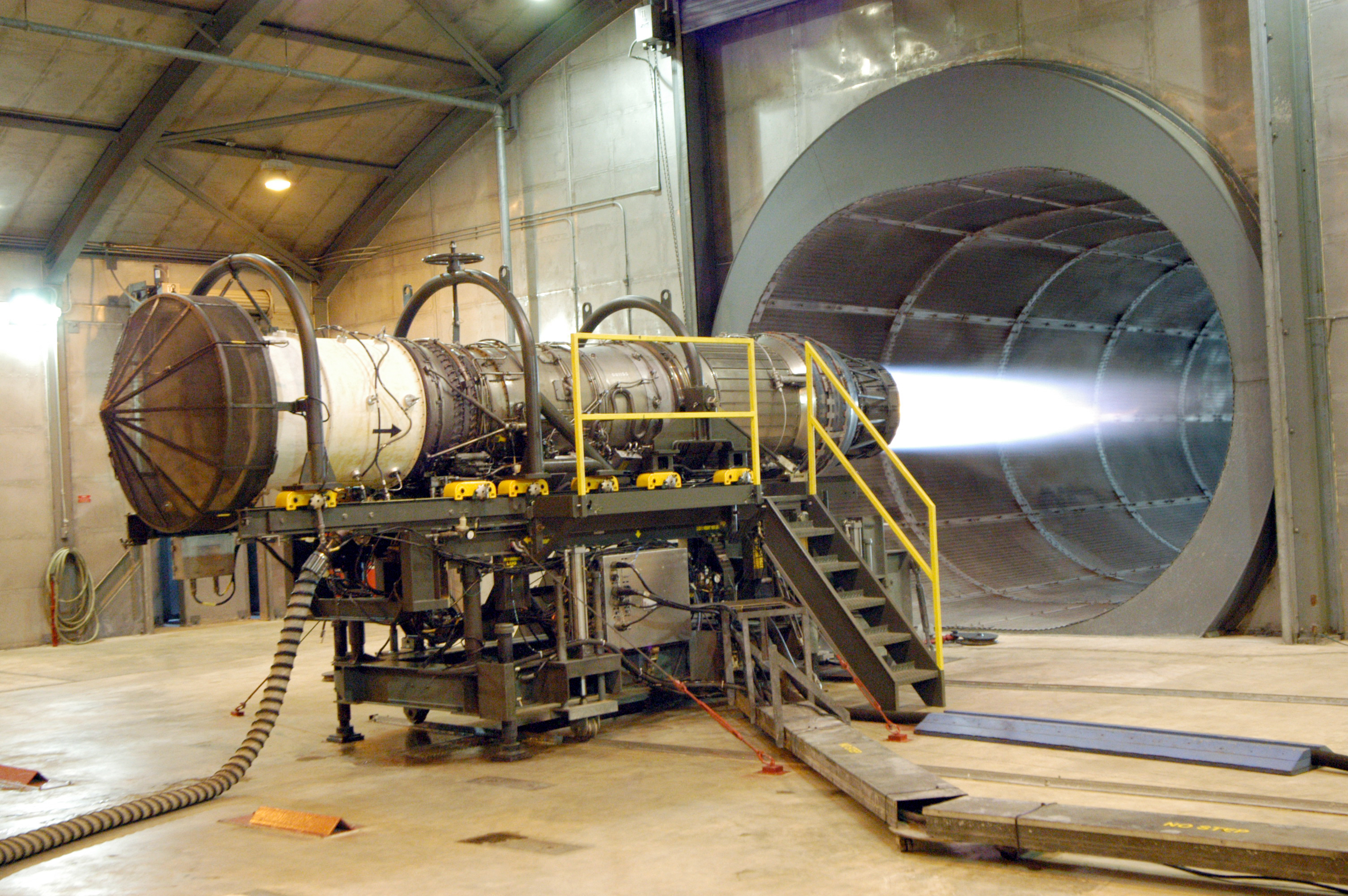
The Pratt & Whitney F-100 engine uses rhenium-containing second-generation superalloys

Rhenium is added to high-temperature superalloys that are used to make jet engine parts, using 70 % of the worldwide rhenium production. Another major application is in platinum–rhenium catalysts, which are primarily used in making lead-free, high-octane gasoline.

=== Alloys ===
Nickel-based superalloys have improved creep strength with the addition of rhenium. These alloys normally contain 3 % or 6 % rhenium. Second-generation alloys contain 3 %; these alloys were used in the engines for the F-15 and F-16, whereas the newer single-crystal third-generation alloys contain 6 % of rhenium; they are used in the F-22 and F-35 engines. Rhenium is also used in the superalloys, such as CMSX-4 (2nd gen) and CMSX-10 (3rd gen) that are used in industrial gas turbine engines like the GE 7FA. Rhenium can cause superalloys to become microstructurally unstable, forming undesirable topologically close packed (TCP) phases. In 4th- and 5th-generation superalloys, ruthenium is used to avoid this effect. Among others the new superalloys are EPM-102 (with 3 % Ru) and TMS-162 (with 6 % Ru), as well as TMS-138 and TMS-174.

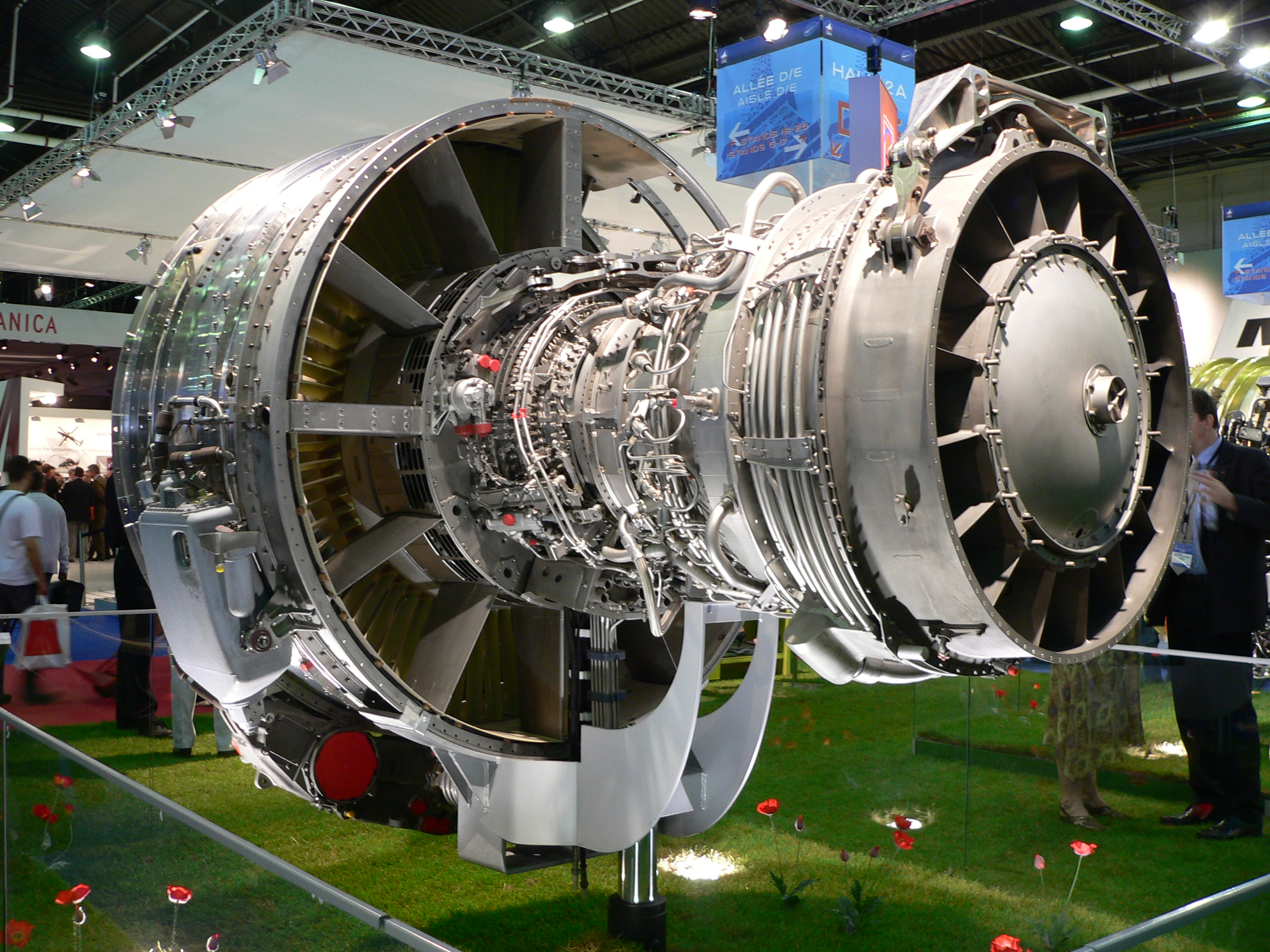
CFM International CFM56 jet engine with blades made with 3 % rhenium

For 2006, the consumption is given as 28 % for General Electric, 28 % Rolls-Royce plc and 12 % Pratt & Whitney, all for superalloys, whereas the use for catalysts only accounts for 14 % and the remaining applications use 18 %. In 2006, 77 % of rhenium consumption in the United States was in alloys. The rising demand for military jet engines and the constant supply made it necessary to develop superalloys with a lower rhenium content. For example, the newer CFM International CFM56 high-pressure turbine (HPT) blades will use Rene N515 with a rhenium content of 1.5 % instead of Rene N5 with 3 %.

Rhenium improves the properties of tungsten. Tungsten-rhenium alloys are more ductile at low temperature, allowing them to be more easily machined. The high-temperature stability is also improved. The effect increases with the rhenium concentration, and therefore tungsten alloys are produced with up to 27 % Re, which is the solubility limit. Tungsten-rhenium wire was originally created in efforts to develop a wire that was more ductile after recrystallization. This allows the wire to meet specific performance objectives, including superior vibration resistance, improved ductility, and higher resistivity. One application for the tungsten-rhenium alloys is X-ray sources. The high melting point of both elements, together with their high atomic mass, makes them stable against the prolonged electron impact. Rhenium tungsten alloys are also applied as thermocouples to measure temperatures up to 2200 °C.

The high temperature stability, low vapor pressure, good wear resistance and ability to withstand arc corrosion of rhenium are useful in self-cleaning electrical contacts. In particular, the discharge that occurs during electrical switching oxidizes the contacts. However, rhenium oxide Re_{2}O_{7} is volatile (sublimes at ~360 °C) and therefore is removed during the discharge.

Rhenium has a high melting point and a low vapor pressure similar to tantalum and tungsten. Therefore, rhenium filaments exhibit a higher stability if the filament is operated not in vacuum, but in oxygen-containing atmosphere. Those filaments are widely used in mass spectrometers, ion gauges and photoflash lamps in photography.

=== Catalysts ===
Rhenium in the form of rhenium-platinum alloy is used as catalyst for catalytic reforming, which is a chemical process to convert petroleum refinery naphthas with low octane ratings into high-octane liquid products. Worldwide, 30 % of catalysts used for this process contain rhenium. The olefin metathesis is the other reaction for which rhenium is used as catalyst. Normally Re_{2}O_{7} on alumina is used for this process. Rhenium catalysts are very resistant to chemical poisoning from nitrogen, sulfur and phosphorus, and so are used in certain kinds of hydrogenation reactions.

=== Other uses ===
The isotopes ^{186}Re and ^{188}Re are radioactive and are used for treatment of liver cancer. They both have similar penetration depth in tissue (5 mm for ^{186}Re and 11 mm for ^{188}Re), but ^{186}Re has the advantage of a longer half-life (90 hours vs. 17 hours).

^{188}Re is also being used experimentally in a novel treatment of pancreatic cancer where it is delivered by means of the bacterium Listeria monocytogenes. The ^{188}Re isotope is also used for the rhenium-SCT (skin cancer therapy). The treatment uses the isotope's properties as a beta emitter for brachytherapy in the treatment of basal cell carcinoma and squamous cell carcinoma of the skin.

Related by periodic trends, rhenium has a similar chemistry to that of technetium; work done to label rhenium onto target compounds can often be translated to technetium. This is useful for radiopharmacy, where it is difficult to work with technetium – especially the technetium-99m isotope used in medicine – due to its expense and short half-life.

Rhenium is used in manufacturing high precision equipment like gyroscopes. Its high density, mechanical stability and corrosion resistance characteristics ensure the equipment's durability and precise performance in demanding conditions. Rhenium cathodes are also used for their stability and precision in spectral analysis.

Rhenium is used in aerospace, nuclear, and electronic industries, and it shows potential for application in medical instrumentation. In the rocket industry, it is used in engine components for booster rockets. Additionally, rhenium was employed in the SP-100 program due to its low-temperature ductility.

Rhenium's stiffness and high melting point makes it a common gasket material for high pressure experiments in diamond anvil cells.

Rhenium was used in the 1960s in photography as an igniter for General Electric flash bulbs (GE #5, M5, AG1 bulbs were advertised with « Guaranteed Rhenium Igniter »)

== Precautions ==
Very little is known about the toxicity of rhenium and its compounds because they are used in very small amounts. Soluble salts, such as the rhenium halides or perrhenates, could be hazardous due to elements other than rhenium or due to rhenium itself. Only a few compounds of rhenium have been tested for their acute toxicity; two examples are potassium perrhenate and rhenium trichloride, which were injected as a solution into rats. The perrhenate had an LD_{50} value of 2800 mg/kg after seven days (this is very low toxicity, similar to that of table salt) and the rhenium trichloride showed LD_{50} of 280 mg/kg.
