= Iwona Stroynowski =

Polish-American immunologist (born 1950)

- Born: August 8, 1950 (age 76)
- Citizenship: American
- Education: Stanford University
- Spouse: Ryszard Stroynowski
- Children: 2 daughters
- Scientific career
- Fields: bacterial genetics, molecular immunology
- Workplaces: California Institute of Technology, University of Texas Southwestern Medical Center
- Thesis: (1979)
- Doctoral advisor: Charles Yanofsky
- Doctoral students: Bette Korber

Iwona Teresa Stroynowski née Fleszar (born 1950) is a Polish-born American immunologist who is Professor in the Department of Immunology and Microbiology at University of Texas Southwestern Medical Center in Dallas, TX. She discovered the process of gene expression control called attenuation early in her career, the first example of a riboswitch mechanism.

== Early life and education ==
Stroynowski received a PhD from Stanford University in 1979 in the field of Genetics under the supervision of Joshua Lederberg. She became an American citizen in 1982. At Stanford, working with Charles Yanofsky, she discovered the attenuation system regulating bacterial amino acid synthesis pathways.

== Academic and research career ==
Stroynowski undertook an extended postdoctoral research period with Leroy Hood at California Institute of Technology, during which she changed fields from bacterial genetics to cellular immunology. Then she became an associate professor at University of Texas Southwestern Medical Center in the Department of Immunology and Microbiology. Her current rank there is Professor of Immunology and Microbiology. Stroynowski's research has delved into the functions of the non-canonical proteins of the Major Histocompatibility Complex, particularly Qa, a protein which is produced in both membrane bound and soluble forms from the same gene, due to alternative splicing. Interferon induction of H-2 antigens was another of her findings. One of her most important findings is that the Qa antigen, a non-variable histocompatibility antigen, has a role in protection from tumor formation.
