= Masataka Ogawa =

Japanese chemist (1865–1930)

- 小川 正孝
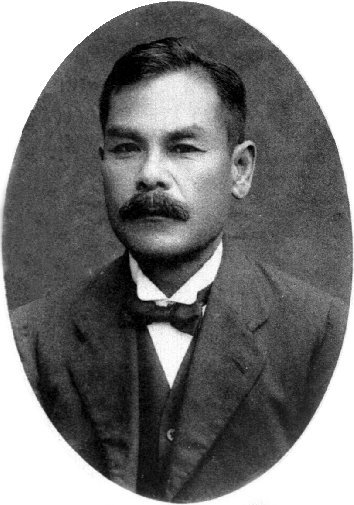
- Born: 21 February 1865; Edo, Tokugawa shogunate
- Died: 11 July 1930 (aged 65); Sendai, Empire of Japan
- Education: Imperial University
- Known for: Discovery of rhenium
- Awards: Sakurai Prize; Order of the Sacred Treasure, 2nd class (1925); Member of the Imperial Court, Senior Third Rank (1928)
- Scientific career
- Fields: Chemistry
- Workplaces: Tohoku Imperial University

Masataka Ogawa (小川 正孝, Ogawa Masataka; 21 February 1865 – 11 July 1930) was a Japanese chemist mainly known for the claimed discovery of element 43 (later known as technetium), which he named nipponium. In fact, he had discovered, but misidentified, element 75 (later called rhenium).

After graduating from the University of Tokyo, he studied under William Ramsay in London, where he worked on the analysis of the rare mineral thorianite. He extracted and isolated a small amount of an apparently unknown substance from the mineral, which he announced as the discovery of element 43, naming the newly discovered element nipponium. He published his results in 1909 and a notice was also published in the Journal of the American Chemical Society. For this work, he was awarded a doctorate and the highest prize of the Tokyo Chemical Society. However, no other researchers were able to replicate his discovery, and the announcement was forgotten.

Ogawa served as president of Tohoku University between 1919 and 1928. While the name nipponium could not be reused for another element, element 113 was also discovered by a team of Japanese scientists and is now named nihonium, also after Japan. The name was chosen in respectful homage to Ogawa's work.
