= Walter Noddack =

German chemist (1893–1960)

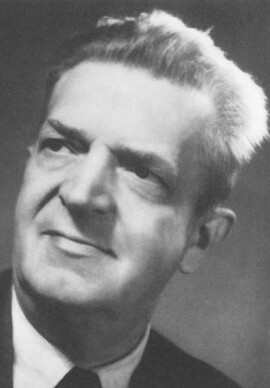
- Noddack in 1925
- Born: 17 August 1893; Berlin, Prussia, German Empire
- Died: 7 December 1960 (aged 67)
- Education: Technische Universität Berlin
- Known for: Discovery of rhenium
- Spouse: Ida Tacke (m. 1928)
- Scientific career
- Fields: Chemistry
- Workplaces: Technische Universität Berlin
- Doctoral students: Günter Wirths

Walter Noddack (17 August 1893 – 7 December 1960) was a German chemist. He, Ida Tacke (who later married Noddack), and Otto Berg reported the discovery of element 43 and element 75 in 1925.

== Rhenium ==
They named element 75 rhenium (Latin Rhenus meaning "Rhine"). Rhenium was the last element to be discovered having a stable isotope. The existence of a yet undiscovered element at this position in the periodic table had been predicted by Henry Moseley in 1914. In 1925 they reported that they detected the element in platinum ore and in the mineral columbite. They also found rhenium in gadolinite and molybdenite. In 1928 they were able to extract 1 g of the element by processing 660 kg of molybdenite. These achievements led to Walter and Ida being awarded the German Chemical Society's prestigious Liebig Medal in 1931.

== Technetium ==
Element 43 was named masurium (after Masuria in Eastern Prussia). The group bombarded columbite with a beam of electrons and deduced element 43 was present by examining X-ray diffraction spectrograms. The wavelength of the X-rays produced is related to the atomic number by a formula derived by Henry Moseley. The team claimed to detect a faint X-ray signal at a wavelength produced by element 43. Contemporary experimenters could not replicate the discovery, and in fact it was dismissed as an error for many years.

It was not until 1998 that this dismissal began to be questioned. John T. Armstrong of the National Institute of Standards and Technology ran computer simulations of the experiments and obtained results very close to those reported by the 1925 team; the claim was further supported by work published by David Curtis of the Los Alamos National Laboratory measuring the (tiny) natural occurrence of technetium. Debate still exists as to whether the 1925 team actually did discover element 43.

== Academic career ==
Noddack was born in Berlin. He became professor for physical chemistry at the University of Freiburg in 1935 and in 1941 at the Reichsuniversität Straßburg. After World War II he changed to the University of Bamberg and in 1956 he became director of the newly founded Research Institute for geochemistry there. He died in Berlin.
