= Mosaic protein =

Protein made up of multiple protein domains

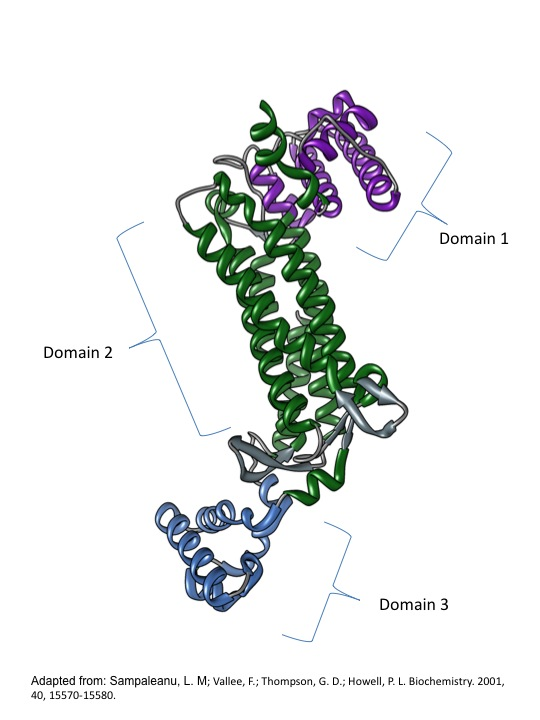
A protein with 3 functional domains

A mosaic protein is a protein that is made up of different protein domains, giving the protein multiple functions. These proteins have quaternary structures, as they are made up of multiple tertiary structured protein domains. Protein domains can combine to form different types of proteins, creating a diversity of proteins. These domains are spread throughout the genome because they are mobile, which is why some domains can be found in a variety of proteins, even though they are seemingly unrelated. This also allows the domains to fold independently, and so they don't become deformed and unfolded in a new environment.

Whereas many proteins are encoded by a single gene, many others get peptide chains from several genes; it is the nature of mosaic proteins that they are always polygenic.

== Development ==
All proteins are transcribed and produced from blueprints in the cell, called genes. Mosaic proteins can be made when two adjacent genes are transcribed together and are therefore made into the same protein. This can benefit the protein because it makes the protein more stable and gives the protein a more complex function. For example, if the protein is an enzyme, it will be able to act more efficiently with its substrates.

Additionally, these proteins are most utilized outside of the cell membrane or on the outer side of membrane proteins. This suggests that these multifunctional proteins played a part in the development of multicellular organisms.

== Examples ==
There are many studies comparing different mosaic proteins and their functional domains, trying to understand protein families and the overall functions of different proteins. For example, SpCRL and SpCRS proteins in sea urchins have a variety of functional domains that are also found within other proteins in the animal. By making comparisons, scientists can understand the complex roles these proteins play. Also, scientists are using the concept of mosaic proteins to improve vaccine function. Vaccines are injections of weak germs into the body that stimulate the body to produce antibodies specific to that germ. This ensures that the body will build an immunity, and that next time the germ is introduced, it will be more equipped to fight it off. Mosaic proteins of the germs can be designed in order to maximize antibody production and quality.

== See also ==
- Fluid mosaic model
