= Paul Kuroda =

Japanese-American nuclear chemist (1917–2001

- Born: Paul Kazuo Kuroda; 1 April 1917; Fukuoka Prefecture, Empire of Japan
- Died: 16 April 2001 (aged 84); Las Vegas, Nevada, USA
- Scientific career
- Fields: Nuclear Chemistry
- Doctoral advisor: Kenjiro Kimura

Paul Kazuo Kuroda (1 April 1917 – 16 April 2001) was a Japanese-American chemist and nuclear scientist.

== Life ==
He was born on April 1, 1917, in Fukuoka Prefecture, Japan. He had three children, including Mitzi Kuroda. He died on April 16, 2001, at his home in Las Vegas, Nevada.

== Career ==
He received bachelor's and doctoral degrees from the Imperial University of Tokyo. He studied under Professor Kenjiro Kimura.

His first paper was published in 1935. He focused mostly on radio and cosmochemistry, and most of his 40 papers published prior to 1944 are about the chemistry of hot springs. In 1944, he became the youngest faculty member of the Imperial University of Tokyo, and after World War II, despite the ban on radiochemistry in Japan, he continued to study radiochemistry until 1949.

On arrival to the United States in 1949, he met with nuclear chemist Glenn Seaborg. He became an assistant professor of chemistry at the University of Arkansas in 1952, becoming a US citizen in 1955.

In 1956, Kuroda was the first to propose that natural self-sustaining nuclear chain reactions were possible. Such a reactor was discovered in September 1972 in the Oklo Mines of Gabon.

He became the first Edgar Wertheim Distinguished Professor of Chemistry in 1979; he officially retired from the University of Arkansas in 1987.

== Honours ==
He is the winner of the Pure Chemistry Prize.
