= Chemical Society of Mexico =

Sociedad Química de México
- Formation: 1956
- Headquarters: Mexico City
- Location: Mexico
- Official language: Spanish
- President: Fernando Cortés Guzmán
- Website: sqm.org.mx

The Chemical Society of Mexico (Spanish: Sociedad Química de México; SQM) also known as the Mexican Chemical Society, is a learned society (professional association) based in Mexico which supports scientific inquiry and education in the field of chemistry.

The Mexican Chemical Society was founded in 1956 in Mexico City by a distinguished group of chemists led by Chemists Rafael Illescas Frisbie and José Ignacio Bolívar Goyanes; Chemical Engineers Manuel Madrazo Garamendi and Guillermo Cortina Anciola; and QFB María del Consuelo Hidalgo Mondragón, with the aim of organizing and representing professionals in the chemical sciences.

The Mexican Chemical Society (Sociedad Química de México, A.C.) is a national civil association focused on promoting the development of professionals and students in chemistry and related fields. To this end, it brings together professionals and students in the chemical sciences, as well as individuals interested in the development and strengthening of chemistry in the country, from both the industrial and academic sectors.

To contribute to the achievement of its objectives, the Society publishes the Journal of the Mexican Chemical Society (prior to 2005, Revista de la Sociedad Química de México) (J. Mex. Chem. Soc.) on a quarterly basis. This scientific journal seeks to advance the understanding of chemistry through novel and original articles. It also publishes the Bulletin of the Mexican Chemical Society, which serves as a dissemination tool for students and professionals in chemistry across the country.

Each year, the Society organizes the International Congress of the Mexican Chemical Society, the International Congress on Chemical Education, and Expoquímica, events held in different cities throughout Mexico.

In addition, it annually awards the National Prize "Andrés Manuel del Río" to recognize professionals whose careers have made significant contributions to the advancement of knowledge in the practice of chemistry, as well as the "Rafael Illescas Frisbie" Awards for the Best Undergraduate, Master's, and Doctoral Theses in Chemical Sciences. It also grants, on a biennial basis, the "Award to Chemistry Professionals in Memory of Dr. Mario J. Molina," jointly presented with the chemical unions (IMIQ and CONIQQ).

In recent years, the Society's activities have diversified. These include the offering of courses for professionals and students across all branches of chemistry, the installation of a Monumental Periodic Table, a webinar platform, and, of course, partnerships with various national and international institutions in support of the development of chemistry in Mexico.

== Creation ==
The Mexican Chemical Society was founded in 1956 in Mexico City by a distinguished group of chemists led by Chemists Rafael Illescas Frisbie and José Ignacio Bolívar Goyanes; Chemical Engineers Manuel Madrazo Garamendi and Guillermo Cortina Anciola; and QFB María del Consuelo Hidalgo Mondragón, with the aim of organizing and representing professionals in the chemical sciences.

== Past Presidents ==
- Rafael Illescas Frisbie, 1956
- Alfredo Sánchez Marroquín, 1957
- Adalberto Tirado Arroyave, 1959
- Manuel Madrazo Garimendi, 1961
- Santos Amaro Domínguez, 1964
- José Ignacio Bolívar Goyanes, 1966
- Guillermo Cortina Anciola, 1968
- Rodolfo Corona de la Vega, 1970
- Héctor Menchaca Solís, 1973
- Jorge Luis Oria y Horcasitas, 1975
- José Francisco Herrán Arellano, 1976
- Ernesto Barroso Gutiérrez, 1977
- José Luis Mateos Gómez, 1978
- Javier Padilla Olivares, 1979
- Manuel Ulacia Esteve, 1980
- Alberto Bremauntz Monge, 1980
- Jaime Cordero Basave, 1982
- Francisco Javier Garfias y Ayala, 1983
- Othón Canales Valverde, 1986
- Eduardo Rojo y Regil, 1989
- Elvira Santos Santos, 1991
- German Espinosa Chavarría, 1993
- Federico García Jiménez, 1996
- Arnulfo Canales Gajá, 1998
- Jaime Noriega Bernechea, 2001
- Andrés Cerda Onofre, 2004
- Guillermo Delgado Lamas, 2007
- Eusebio Juaristi Cosío, 2009
- Cecilia Anaya Berríos, 2011
- Lena Ruiz Azuara, 2013
- Benjamín Velasco Bejarano, 2016
- María de Jesús Rosales Hoz, 2018
- Ignacio González Martínez, 2020
- Gabriel Eduardo Cuevas González Bravo, 2022
- David Quintanar Guerrero, 2024

== Awards and Recognitions ==
- National Chemistry Prize "Andrés Manuel del Río".
- "Rafael Illescas Frisbie" Award for the Best Undergraduate, Master's, and Doctoral Theses in Chemical Sciences.
- Award for Chemistry Professionals in Memory of Dr. Mario J. Molina (Unión Química).

== International Congress of the Mexican Chemical Society and International Congress on Chemical Education ==
These annual conferences represent an ideal forum for the exchange of knowledge, trends, advances, and perspectives among Mexican and international scientists. Currently, the congresses include a wide range of activities in their programs, such as pre-congress courses, plenary lectures, symposia, oral presentations, professional poster sessions, undergraduate student poster competitions, round tables, workshops, book presentations, science outreach workshops for children, and cultural activities.

== Monumental Periodic Table ==
This installation consists of 88 cubes, each measuring 1 m^{3}, representing the periodic table of the elements. Its design allows visitors to walk through it and learn about the properties and applications of the elements in science and everyday life. It can be installed in both public spaces and educational institutions.

== Webinars (Online Lectures) ==
These are lectures delivered via the internet with the aim of making knowledge related to chemistry and cutting-edge topics more accessible to students, professionals, and institutions interested in the field, breaking down geographical barriers. The Society currently maintains an agreement with the American Chemical Society (ACS), through which a series of lectures in Spanish by researchers from different countries is broadcast. In addition, the Mexican Chemical Society has its own lecture series featuring national researchers, as well as specialized series developed in collaboration with other organizations.

== Specialized Networks ==
Scientific collaboration networks are conceived as spaces for convergence and integration among different branches of chemistry and related academic organizations, promoting complementarity and interdisciplinary dialogue without replacing or competing with existing structures, divisions, or associations. Their purpose is to create points of intersection that strengthen capabilities, reduce fragmentation within the field, and foster the development of shared scientific agendas.

== Social Networks ==
- Facebook
- Instagram
- X
- YouTube
- TikTok
