= C8H8O4 =

The molecular formula C_{8}H_{8}O_{4} (molar mass : 168.15 g/mol, exact mass : 168.042259 u) may refer to:

- Dehydroacetic acid
- 3,4-Dihydroxyphenylacetic acid
- 3,4-Dihydroxyphenylglycolaldehyde
- 2,6-Dimethoxy-1,4-benzoquinone
- Homogentisic acid
- 4-Hydroxymandelic acid
- 5-Methoxysalicylic acid
- Norcantharidin
- Orsellinic acid
- Quinolacetic acid
- Trihydroxyacetophenones
  - Gallacetophenone (2,3,4-trihydroxyacetophenone)
  - 2,4,6-Trihydroxyacetophenone
- Vanillic acid
