= C25H30O4 =

The molecular formula C_{25}H_{30}O_{4} (molar mass: 394.5 g/mol) may refer to:

- Bixin
- Linderatin
