= Muenster cheese =

Semi-soft cheese from the United States

Muenster
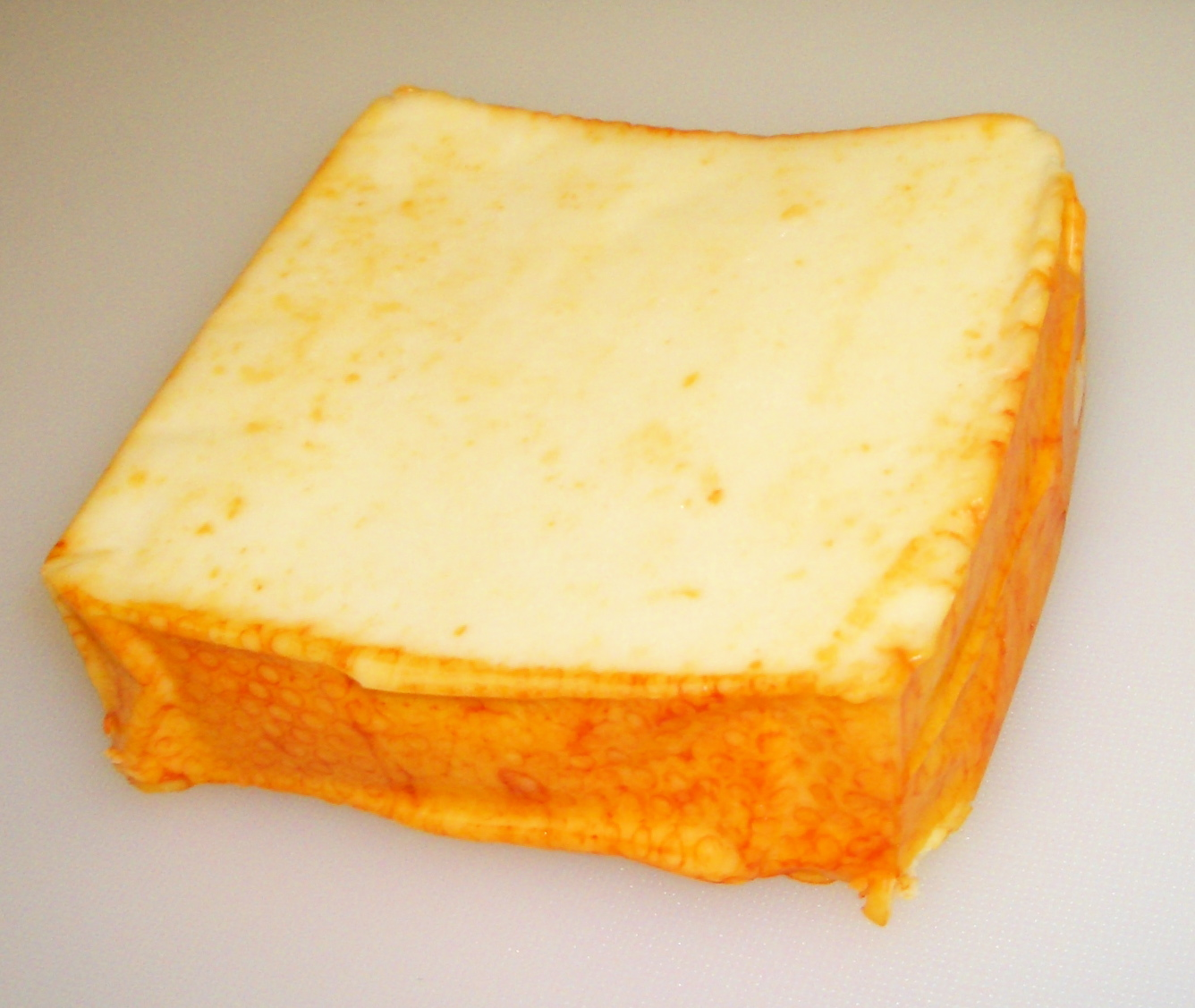
- Country of origin: United States
- Source of milk: Cows
- Texture: Soft
- Fat content: 8.5 g / oz (30%)
- Protein content: 6.6 g / oz (23%)

Muenster (English: /ˈmʌnstər/ or /ˈmʊnstər/) is a semi-soft cheese created in the United States and popularized in the early twentieth century. Muenster cheese may be an imitation of Munster cheese, a washed-rind cheese originating in Munster, Haut-Rhin, Alsace, which was familiar to German immigrants. Its name is not related to the German cities of Münster, Westphalia, or Munster, Lower Saxony, nor to the Irish province of Munster.

Muenster is pale in color and smooth in texture with an orange rind. The cheese is made from pasteurized cow's milk. The rind's orange color is from annatto, a sweet and nutty seasoning used to add flavor and color to cheeses such as Cheddar, Colby, Red Leicester, and Mimolette. Muenster usually has a very mild flavor and smooth, soft texture. In some cases, when properly aged, it can develop a strong flavor with a pungent aroma. This cheese is commonly served as an appetizer. Because it melts well, it is also often used in dishes such as grilled cheese sandwiches, tuna melts, quesadillas, cheeseburgers, macaroni and cheese, and pizza.

The spelling "Muenster" distinguishes the American cheese from Munster cheese, which is made from unpasteurized cow's milk in the Vosges mountains in Alsace.

The French style of cheese is typically called Munster, according to Wisconsin Cheese, and it's made from unpasteurized cow's milk, using a washed rind process that makes the French version considerably more pungent than the U.S.-made Muenster cheese and also turns the rind orange (per Robust Kitchen). Wisconsin Muenster, by contrast, gets its orange exterior from annato, a natural vegetable dye.

== See also ==
- List of cheeses
