= Theodor Weyl =

German chemist (1851–1913)

- Born: 8 January 1851; Berlin, Germany
- Died: 6 June 1913 (aged 62); Berlin, Germany
- Scientific career
- Fields: Chemistry
- Doctoral advisor: Felix Hoppe-Seyler, Emil Heinrich Du Bois-Reymond

Theodor Weyl (8 January 1851 – 6 June 1913) was a German chemist and hygienist born in Berlin.

He studied at the universities of Heidelberg, Berlin and Strasbourg, earning his doctorate in 1872 with a dissertation on animal and plant proteins. Following graduation he worked as an assistant in the physiology laboratory at Berlin, shortly afterwards becoming an assistant professor at the University of Erlangen. During his tenure at Erlangen he spent the winter of 1880–81 performing research on the electric organs of rays at the Stazione Zoologica Anton Dohrn in Naples.

After several years in Erlangen, he returned to Berlin, where he focused on investigations of terpenes in a laboratory he established. Afterwards he remained in Berlin as a lecturer, also working as a scientist in Robert Koch's hygienic institute at the Technische Hochschule in Charlottenburg (now Technische Universität Berlin).

With Heinrich Houben (1875–1940), the "Houben-Weyl Methods of Organic Chemistry" is named, a massive reference work that by 2003 had grown to 162 volumes. The project was originally started by Weyl (initial publication in 1909), later being revised and reissued by Houben.

He made contributions in the field environmental chemistry, being deeply concerned with issues involving public health. His name is associated with "Weyl's test", a procedure involving color reaction for creatinine.

== Selected writings ==
- "The coal-tar colors, with especial reference to their injurious qualities and the restriction of their use", (published in 1892 in English).
- Handbuch der Hygiene (16 editions published between 1895 and 1919 in 3 languages).
- Die Einwirkung hygienischer Werke auf die Gesundheit der Städte mit besonderer Rücksicht auf Berlin, 1903
- Die Methoden der organischen Chemie: ein Handbuch für die Arbeiten im Laboratorium, 1909.
