= Hoesch reaction =

Chemical reaction

Houben–Hoesch reaction
Named after	Josef Houben; Kurt Hoesch
Reaction type	Coupling reaction

The Hoesch reaction or Houben–Hoesch reaction is an organic reaction in which a nitrile reacts with an arene compound to form an aryl ketone. The reaction is a type of Friedel–Crafts acylation with hydrogen chloride and a Lewis acid catalyst.

The synthesis of 2,4,6-Trihydroxyacetophenone (THAP) from phloroglucinol is representative: If two-equivalents are added, 2,4-Diacetylphloroglucinol is the product.

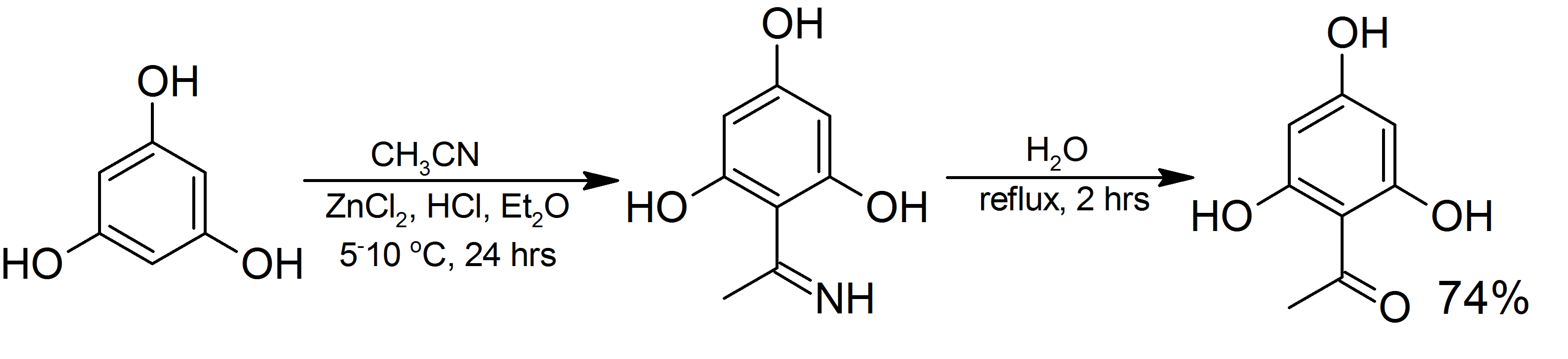
Hoesch reaction example, 1-(2,4,6-trihydroxyphenyl)ethanone from phloroglucinol

An imine can be isolated as an intermediate reaction product. The attacking electrophile is possibly a species of the type R-C^{+}=NHCl^{−}. The arene must be electron-rich i.e. phenol or aniline type. A related reaction is the Gattermann reaction in which hydrocyanic acid not a nitrile is used.

The reaction is named after Kurt Hoesch and Josef Houben who reported about this new reaction type in respectively 1915 and 1926.

== Mechanism ==
The mechanism of the reaction involves two steps. The first step is a nucleophilic addition to the nitrile with the aid of a polarizing Lewis acid, forming an imine, which is later hydrolyzed during the aqueous workup to yield the final aryl ketone.

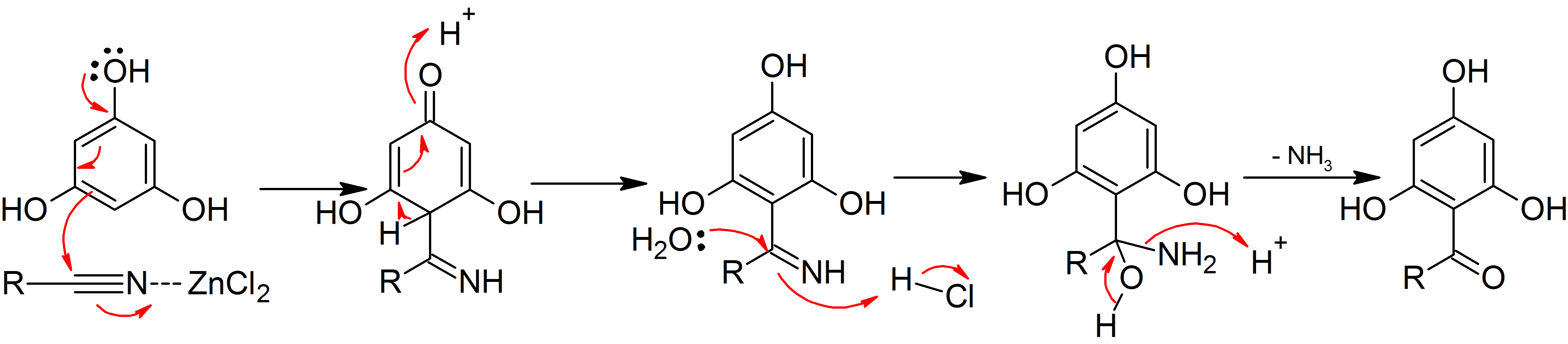
Hoesch reaction mechanism

== Applications ==
- Hoesch reaction is demonstrated for Buflomedil, Flopropione, Linderatin, Leptospermone, Viminol, & meta-Phloretin (novel artificial sweetener compound).
- Hoesch reaction with isovaleronitrile could in theory be used for the first step in the synthesis of Humulone & Lupulone, although in practice a Friedel-Crafts reaction with isovaleric acid was performed.

== See also ==
- Stephen aldehyde synthesis
- Gattermann reaction
