= Trihydroxyacetophenone =

Trihydroxyacetophenone may refer to:

- 2,4,6-Trihydroxyacetophenone
- Gallacetophenone (2,3,4-trihydroxyacetophenone)
