= Cheddar cheese =

Hard cheese

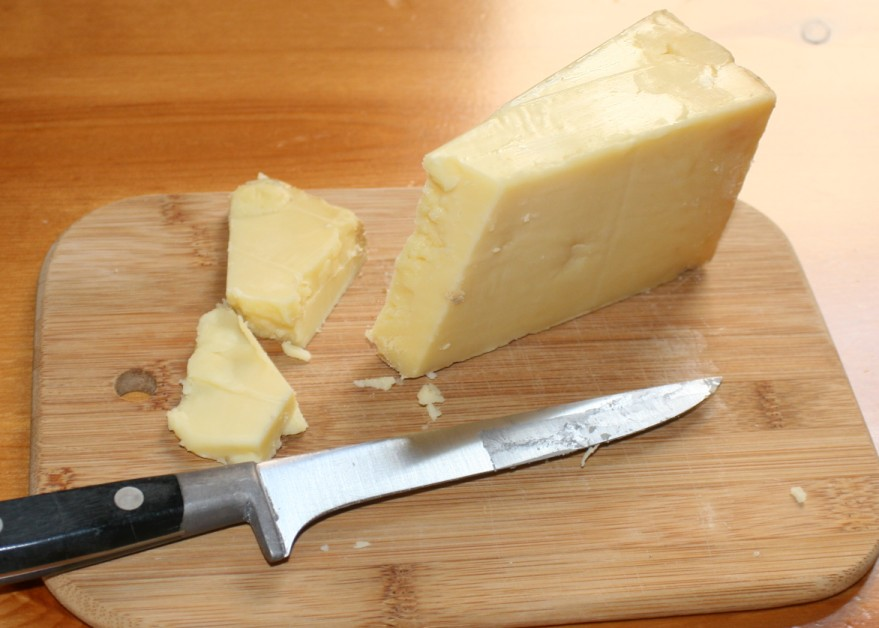
- A wedge of partially sliced cheddar cheese
- Country of origin: United Kingdom
- Region: Somerset
- Town: Cheddar
- Source of milk: Cow
- Pasteurised: Depends on variety
- Texture: Relatively hard
- Aging time: 3–24 months depending on variety
- Certification: West Country Farmhouse Cheddar (PDO); Orkney Scottish Island Cheddar (PGI)
- Named after: Its place of origin

Cheddar cheese (or simply cheddar) is a natural cheese that is relatively hard, off-white (or orange if colourings such as annatto are added), and sometimes sharp-tasting. It originates from the village of Cheddar in Somerset, South West England.

Cheddar is produced all over the world, and cheddar cheese has no Protected Designation of Origin (PDO). In 2007, the name West Country Farmhouse Cheddar was registered in the European Union and (after Brexit) the United Kingdom, defined as cheddar produced from local milk within Somerset, Dorset, Devon and Cornwall and manufactured using traditional methods. Protected Geographical Indication (PGI) was registered for Orkney Scottish Island Cheddar in 2013 in the EU, which also applies under UK law.

Globally, the style and quality of cheeses labelled as cheddar varies greatly, with some processed cheeses packaged as "cheddar". Cheeses similar to Red Leicester are sometimes marketed as "red cheddar".

Cheddar cheese is the most popular cheese in the UK, accounting for 51% of the country's £1.9 billion annual cheese market. It is the second-most popular cheese in the United States behind mozzarella, with an average annual consumption of 10 lb (4.5 kg) per capita. The United States produced approximately 3,000,000,000 lb (1,300,000 long tons; 1,400,000 tonnes) of cheddar in 2014, and the UK produced 258,000 long tons (262,000 tonnes) in 2008.

== History ==
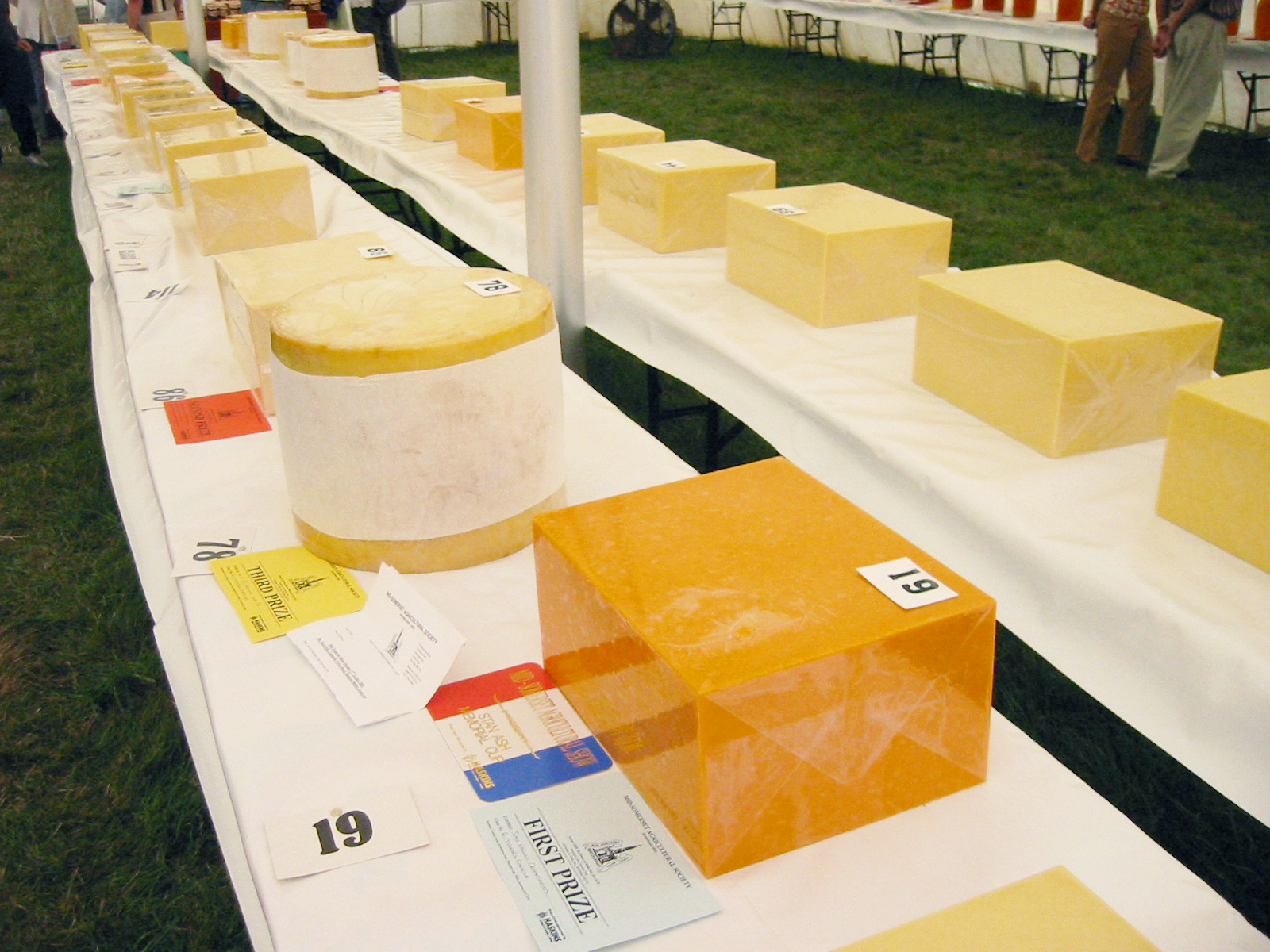
Cheddar cheeses on display at the 2003 Mid-Somerset Show

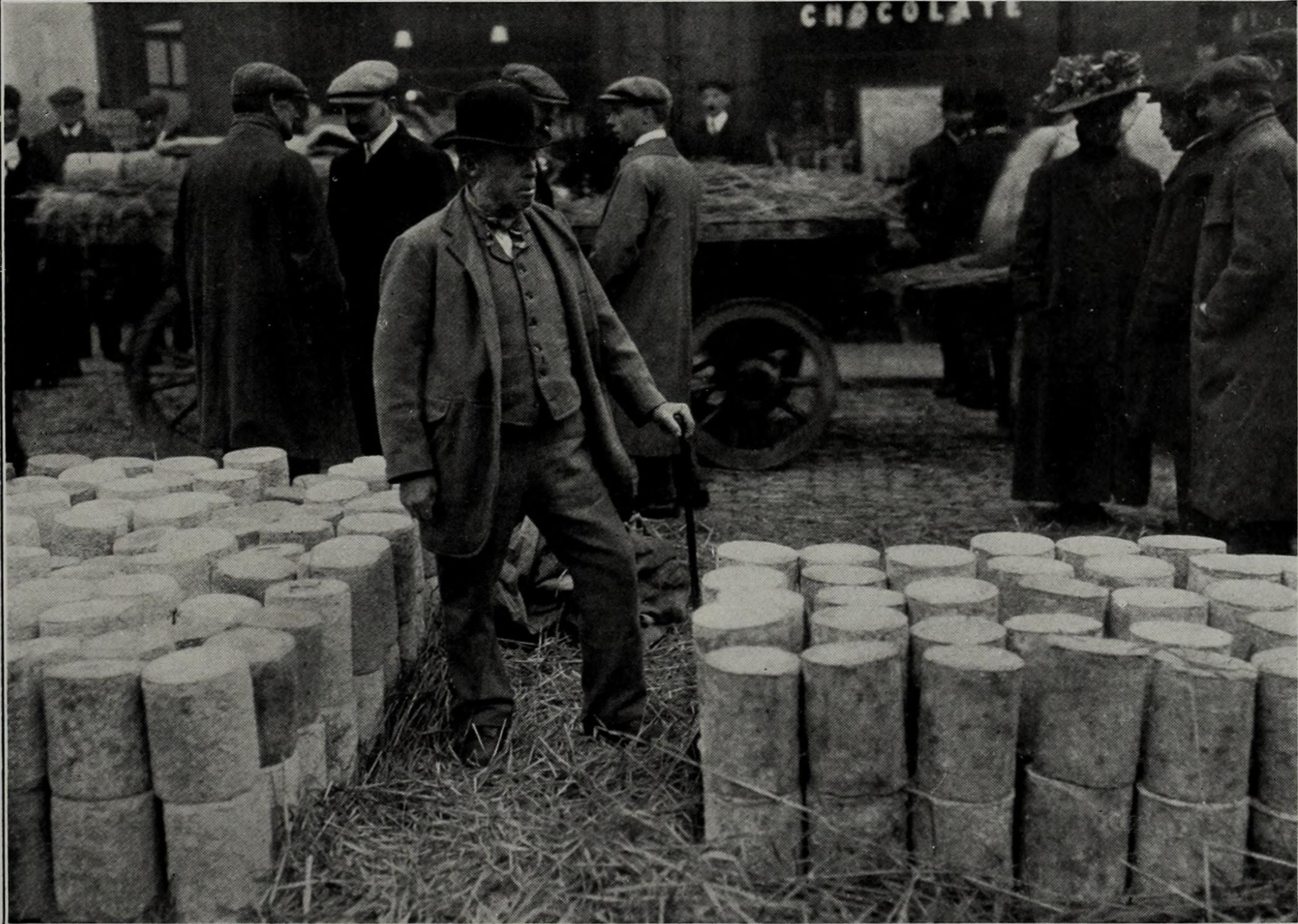
Cylinders of cheddar on display in London, early 20th century

Cheddar cheese originates from the village of Cheddar in Somerset, southwest England. Cheddar Gorge on the edge of the village contains a number of caves, which provided the ideal humidity and steady temperature for maturing the cheese. Cheddar traditionally had to be made within 30 mi (48 km) of Wells Cathedral.

The 19th-century Somerset dairyman Joseph Harding was central to the modernisation and standardisation of cheddar. For his technical innovations, promotion of dairy hygiene, and volunteer dissemination of modern cheese-making techniques, Harding has been dubbed "the father of cheddar". Harding introduced new equipment to the process of cheese-making, including his "revolving breaker" for curd cutting; the revolving breaker saved much manual effort in the cheese-making process. The "Joseph Harding method" was the first modern system for cheddar production based upon scientific principles. Harding stated that cheddar cheese is "not made in the field, nor in the byre, nor even in the cow, it is made in the dairy". Together, Joseph Harding and his wife introduced cheddar in Scotland and North America, while his sons Henry and William Harding were responsible for introducing cheddar cheese production to Australia and facilitating the establishment of the cheese industry in New Zealand, respectively.

During the Second World War and for nearly a decade thereafter, most of the milk in Britain was used to make a single kind of cheese nicknamed "government cheddar" as part of the war economy and rationing. As a result, almost all other cheese production in the country was wiped out. Before the First World War, more than 3,500 cheese producers were in Britain; fewer than 100 remained after the Second World War.

According to a United States Department of Agriculture researcher, cheddar is the world's most popular cheese and is the most studied type of cheese in scientific publications.

== Process ==
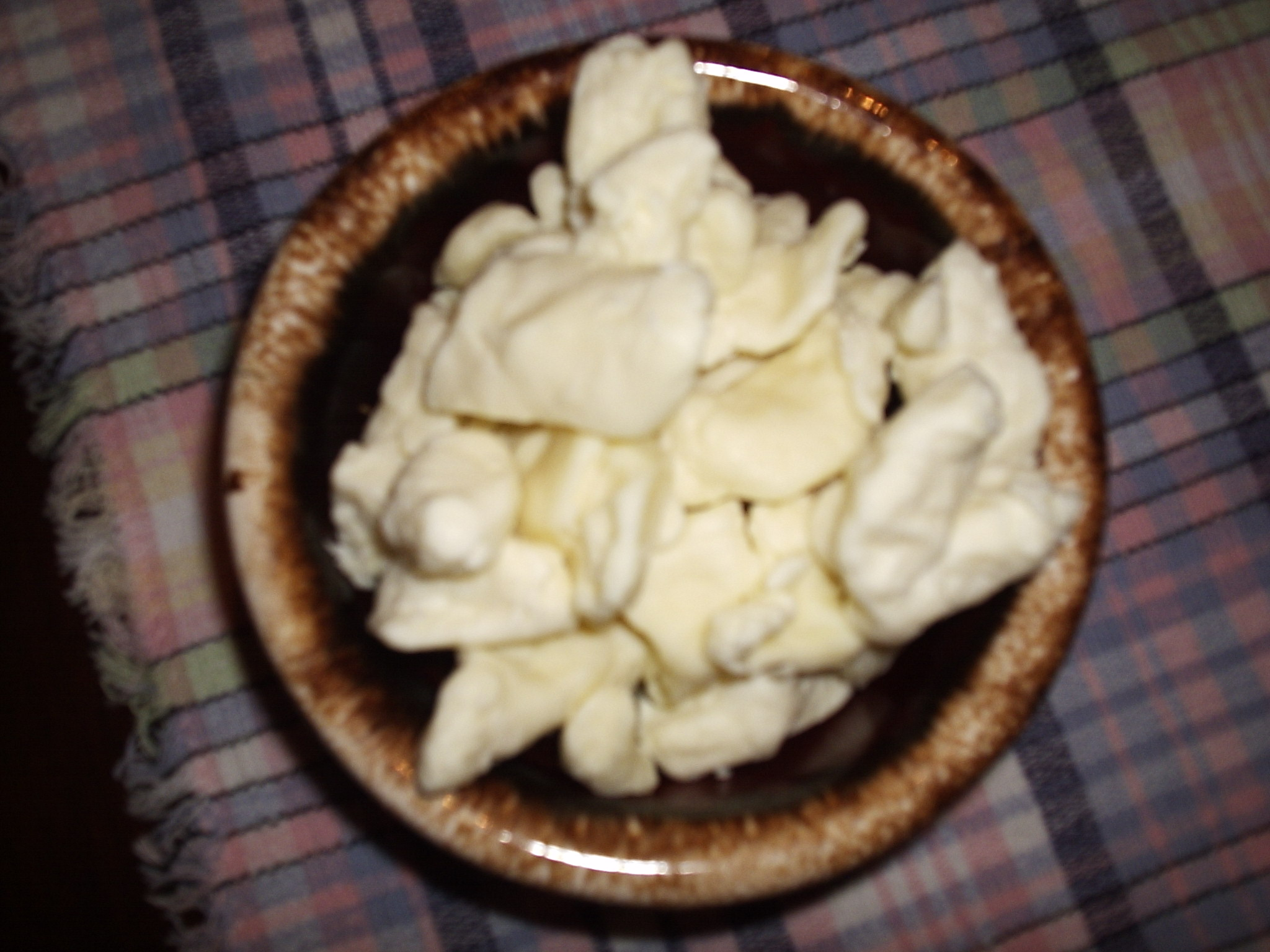
A bowl of cheese curds

During the manufacture of cheddar, the curds and whey are separated using rennet, an enzyme complex normally produced from the stomachs of newborn calves, while in vegetarian or kosher cheeses, bacterial, yeast or mould-derived chymosin is used.

"Cheddaring" refers to an additional step in the production of cheddar cheese where, after heating, the curd is kneaded with salt, cut into cubes to drain the whey, and then stacked and turned. Strong, extra-mature cheddar, sometimes called vintage, needs to be matured for 15 months or more. The cheese is kept at a constant temperature, often requiring special facilities. As with other hard cheese varieties produced worldwide, caves provide an ideal environment for maturing cheese; still, today, some cheddar is matured in the caves at Wookey Hole and Cheddar Gorge. Additionally, some versions of cheddar are smoked.

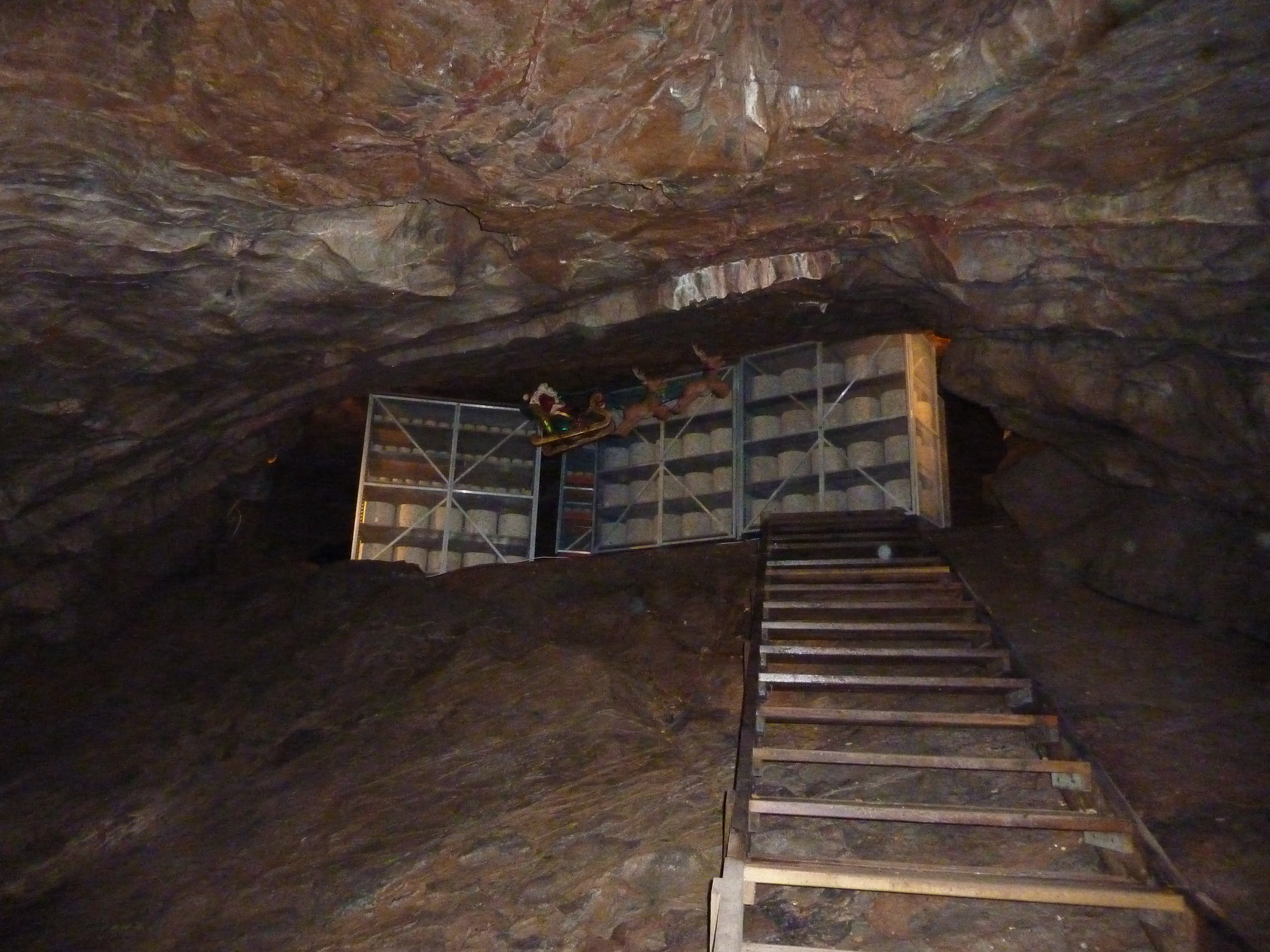
Cheddar cheese maturing in the caves at Cheddar Gorge

== Character ==
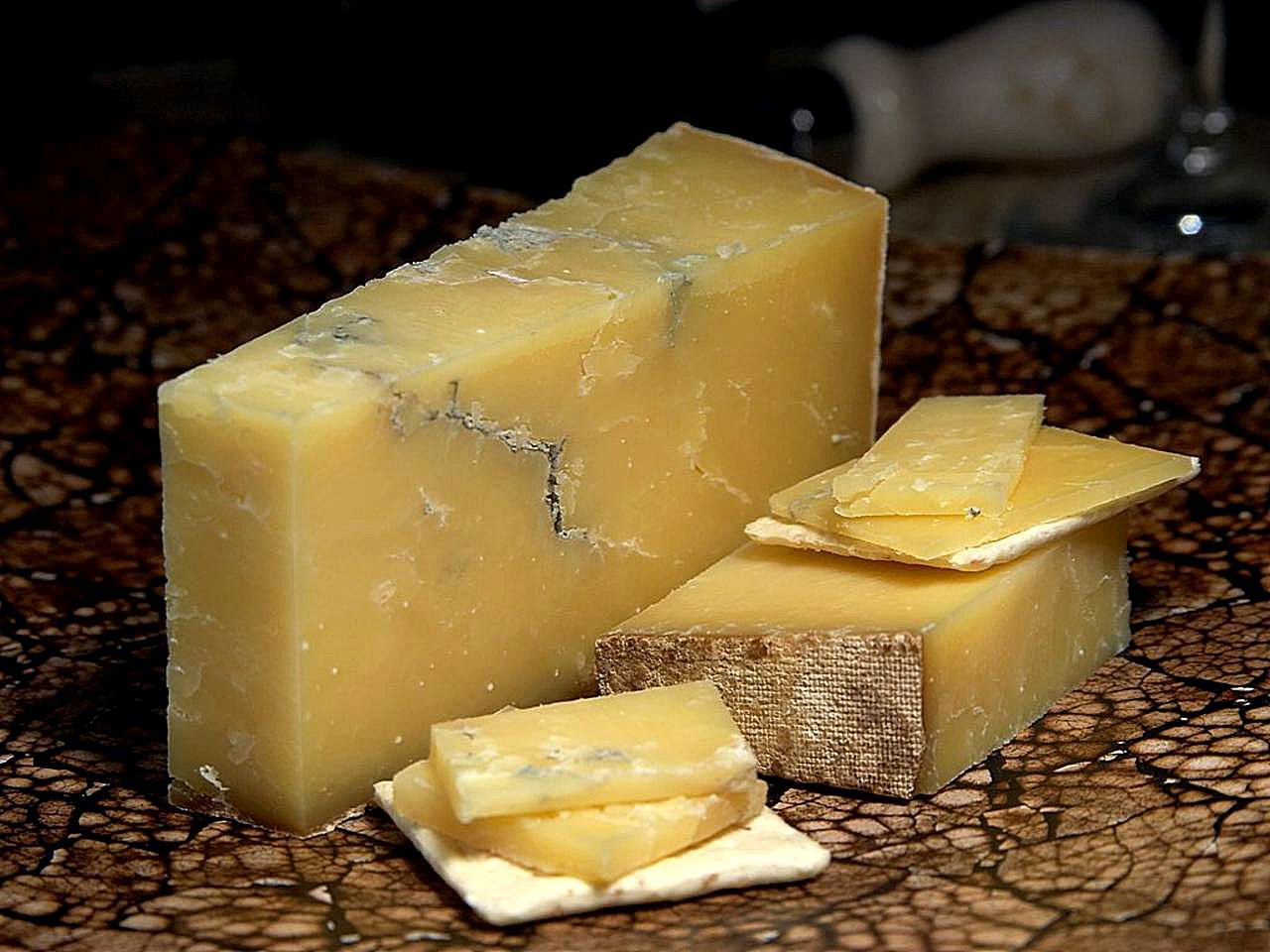
An unusual cheddar cheese that has been matured to produce veins of mould

The ideal quality of the original Somerset cheddar was described by Joseph Harding in 1864 as "close and firm in texture, yet mellow in character or quality; it is rich with a tendency to melt in the mouth, the flavour full and fine, approaching to that of a hazelnut".

Cheddar made in the classical way tends to have a sharp, pungent flavour, often slightly earthy. The "sharpness" of cheddar is associated with the levels of bitter peptides in the cheese. This bitterness has been found to be significant to the overall perception of the aged cheddar flavour. The texture is firm, with farmhouse traditional cheddar being slightly crumbly; it should also, if mature, contain large cheese crystals consisting of calcium lactate – often precipitated when matured for times longer than six months.

Cheddar can be a deep to pale yellow (off-white) colour, or a yellow-orange colour when certain plant extracts are added, such as beet juice. One commonly used spice is annatto, extracted from seeds of the tropical achiote tree. Originally added to simulate the colour of high-quality milk from grass-fed Jersey and Guernsey cows, annatto may also impart a sweet, nutty flavour. The largest producer of cheddar cheese in the United States, Kraft, uses a combination of annatto and oleoresin paprika, an extract of the lipophilic (oily) portion of paprika.

Cheddar was sometimes (and still can be found) packaged in black wax, but was more commonly packaged in larded cloth, which was impermeable to contaminants, but still allowed the cheese to "breathe".

=== Original-cheddar designation ===
The Slow Food Movement has created a cheddar presidium, arguing that only three cheeses should be called "original cheddar". Their specifications, which go further than the "West Country Farmhouse Cheddar" PDO, require that cheddar be made in Somerset and with traditional methods, such as using raw milk, traditional animal rennet, and a cloth wrapping.

== Nutrition ==
Cheddar cheese
Nutritional value per 100 g (3.5 oz)
- Energy: 409 kcal (1,710 kJ)
- Carbohydrates: 2.4 g
- Fat: 34 g
- Protein: 23.3 g
Vitamins and minerals
| Vitamins | Quantity %DV^{†} |
| Vitamin A equiv. | 35% 316 μg |
| Thiamine (B1) | 2% 0.029 mg |
| Riboflavin (B2) | 34% 0.441 mg |
| Niacin (B3) | 0% 0.052 mg |
| Vitamin B6 | 4% 0.069 mg |
| Vitamin B12 | 44% 1.06 μg |
| Minerals | Quantity %DV^{†} |
| Calcium | 54% 707 mg |
| Iron | 1% 0.16 mg |
| Magnesium | 6% 26.8 mg |
| Manganese | 1% 0.026 mg |
| Phosphorus | 37% 458 mg |
| Potassium | 3% 77 mg |
| Selenium | 51% 28.3 μg |
| Sodium | 28% 654 mg |
| Zinc | 33% 3.67 mg |
- Other constituents: Quantity
- Water: 37 g
- Link to Full Report from USDA Database
- ^{†}Percentages estimated using US recommendations for adults, except for potassium, which is estimated based on expert recommendation from the National Academies.

Cheddar cheese is 37% water, 34% fat, 23% protein, and 2% carbohydrates (table). In a reference amount of 100 g (3.5 oz), cheddar cheese supplies 409 calories of food energy, and is a rich source (20% or more of the Daily Value, DV) of vitamin B_{12}, vitamin A, riboflavin, calcium, selenium, and other dietary minerals (table).

== International production ==
=== Australia ===
As of 2013, cheddar accounts for over 55% of the Australian cheese market, with average annual consumption around 17 lb (7.5 kg) per person. Cheddar is so commonly found that the name is rarely used: instead, cheddar is sold by strength alone as e.g. "mild", "tasty" or "sharp".

=== Canada ===
Following a wheat midge outbreak in Canada in the mid-19th century, farmers in Ontario began to convert to dairy farming in large numbers, and cheddar cheese became their main exportable product, even being exported to England. By the turn of the 20th century, 1,242 cheddar factories were in Ontario, and cheddar had become Canada's second-largest export after timber. Cheddar exports totalled 234,000,000 lb (106,000,000 kg) in 1904, but by 2012, Canada was a net importer of cheese. James L. Kraft grew up on a dairy farm in Ontario, before moving to Chicago. According to the writer Sarah Champman, "Although we cannot wholly lay the decline of cheese craft in Canada at the feet of James Lewis Kraft, it did correspond with the rise of Kraft’s processed cheese empire." Most Canadian cheddar is produced in the provinces of Québec (40.8%) and Ontario (36%), though other provinces produce some and some smaller artisanal producers exist. The annual production is 120,000 tons.

Canadian cheddar cheese soup is a featured dish at the Canada Pavilion at Epcot in Walt Disney World.

Percentage of butterfat or milk fat must be labelled by the words milk fat or abbreviations B.F. or M.F.

=== New Zealand ===
Most of the cheddar produced in New Zealand is factory-made, although some are handmade by artisan cheesemakers. Factory-made cheddar is generally sold relatively young within New Zealand, but the Anchor dairy company ships New Zealand cheddars to the UK, where the blocks mature for another year or so.

=== United Kingdom ===
The four English counties where West Country Farmhouse Cheddar PDO may be produced

Only one producer of the cheese is now based in the village of Cheddar, the Cheddar Gorge Cheese Co. The name "cheddar" is not protected under European Union or UK law, though the name "West Country Farmhouse Cheddar" has an EU and (following Brexit) a UK protected designation of origin (PDO) registration, and may only be produced in Somerset, Devon, Dorset and Cornwall, using milk sourced from those counties. Cheddar is usually sold as mild, medium, mature, extra mature or vintage. Cheddar produced in Orkney is registered as an EU protected geographical indication under the name "Orkney Scottish Island Cheddar". This protection highlights the use of traditional methods, passed down through generations since 1946 and its uniqueness in comparison to other cheddar cheeses. "West Country Farmhouse Cheddar" is protected outside the UK and the EU as a Geographical Indication also in China, Georgia, Iceland, Japan, Moldova, Montenegro, Norway, Serbia, Switzerland and Ukraine.

Furthermore, a Protected Geographical Indication (PGI) was registered for Orkney Scottish Island Cheddar in 2013 in the EU, which also applies under UK law. It is protected as a geographical indication in Iceland, Montenegro, Norway and Serbia.

=== United States ===
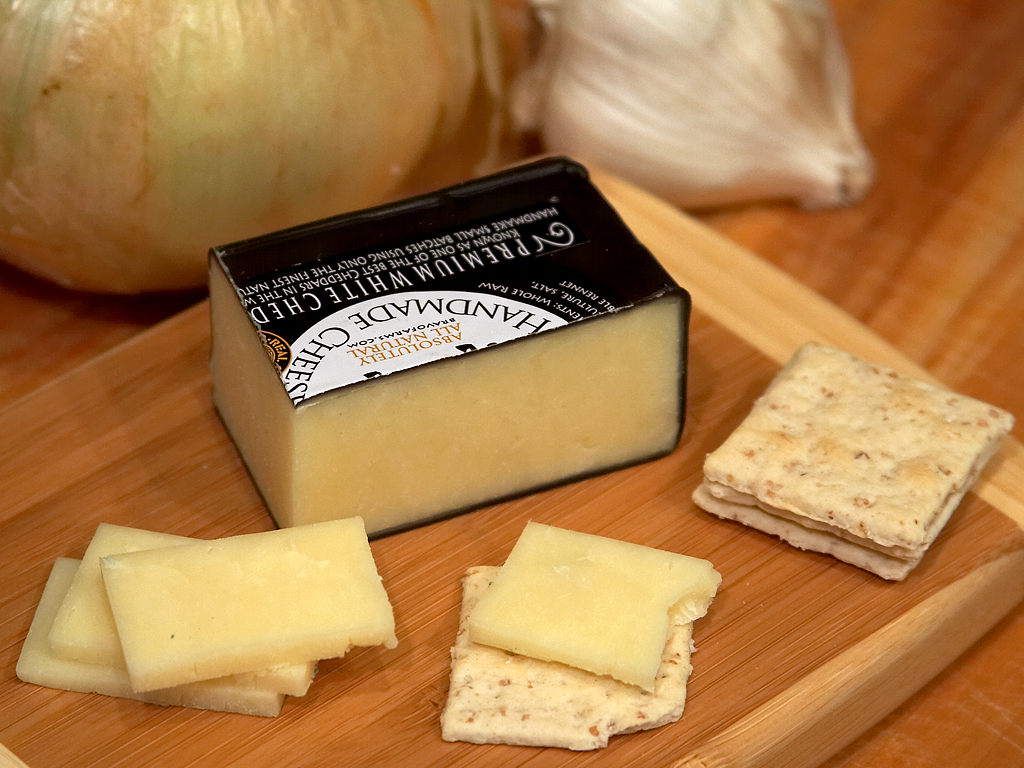
Cheddar cheese from Traver, California

The state of Wisconsin produces the most cheddar cheese in the United States; other centres of production include California, Idaho, New York, Vermont, Oregon, Texas, and Oklahoma. It is sold in several varieties, namely mild, medium, sharp, extra sharp, New York style, white, and Vermont. New York–style cheddar is particularly sharp/acidic, but tends to be somewhat softer than the milder-tasting varieties. Cheddar that does not contain annatto is frequently labelled "white cheddar" or "Vermont cheddar", regardless of whether it was actually produced there. Vermont's three creameries produce cheddar cheeses – Cabot Creamery, which produces the 16-month-old "Private Stock Cheddar"; the Grafton Village Cheese Company; and Shelburne Farms.

Some processed cheeses or "cheese foods" are called "cheddar flavored". Examples include Easy Cheese, a cheese-food packaged in a pressurised spray can; also, as packs of square, sliced, individually-wrapped "process cheese", which is sometimes also pasteurised.

Cheddar is one of several products used by the United States Department of Agriculture to track the status of America's overall dairy industry; reports are issued weekly detailing prices and production quantities.

== Records ==
U.S. President Andrew Jackson once held an open house party at the White House at which he served a 1,400 lb (640 kg) block of cheddar. The White House is said to have smelled of cheese for weeks. The real-life event was mentioned several times in The West Wing, with the White House staff participating in "Big Block of Cheese Day", a fictional workday on which White House Chief of Staff Leo McGarry encourages his staff to meet with fringe special interest groups that normally would not get attention from the White House.

A cheese of 7,000 lb (3,200 kg) was produced in Ingersoll, Ontario, in 1866 and exhibited in New York and Britain; it was described in the poem "Ode on the Mammoth Cheese Weighing over 7,000 Pounds" by Canadian poet James McIntyre.

In 1893, farmers from the town of Perth, Ontario, produced the "mammoth cheese", which weighed 22,000 lb (10,000 kg) for the Chicago World's Fair. It was to be exhibited at the Canadian display, but the mammoth cheese fell through the floor and was placed on a reinforced concrete floor in the Agricultural Building. It received the most journalistic attention at the fair and was awarded the bronze medal. A larger, Wisconsin cheese of 34,591 lb (15,690 kg) was made for the 1964 New York World's Fair. A cheese this size would use the equivalent of the daily milk production of 16,000 cows.

Oregon members of the Federation of American Cheese-makers created the largest cheddar in 1989. The cheese weighed 56,850 lb (25,790 kg).

In 2012, Wisconsin cheese shop owner Edward Zahn discovered and sold a batch of unintentionally aged cheddar up to 40 years old, possibly "the oldest collection of cheese ever assembled and sold to the public". The old cheese has extensive crystallization on the outside and is "creamier and overwhelmingly sharp" on the inside.

== See also ==
- List of cheeses
- Colby, Red Leicester – cheeses similar to cheddar that also contain annatto for a sweet and nutty flavor and an orange colour
- Wedginald – a round of cheddar made famous when its maturation was broadcast on the Internet
