= Annatto =

Orange-red condiment and food coloring derived from the seeds of the achiote tree

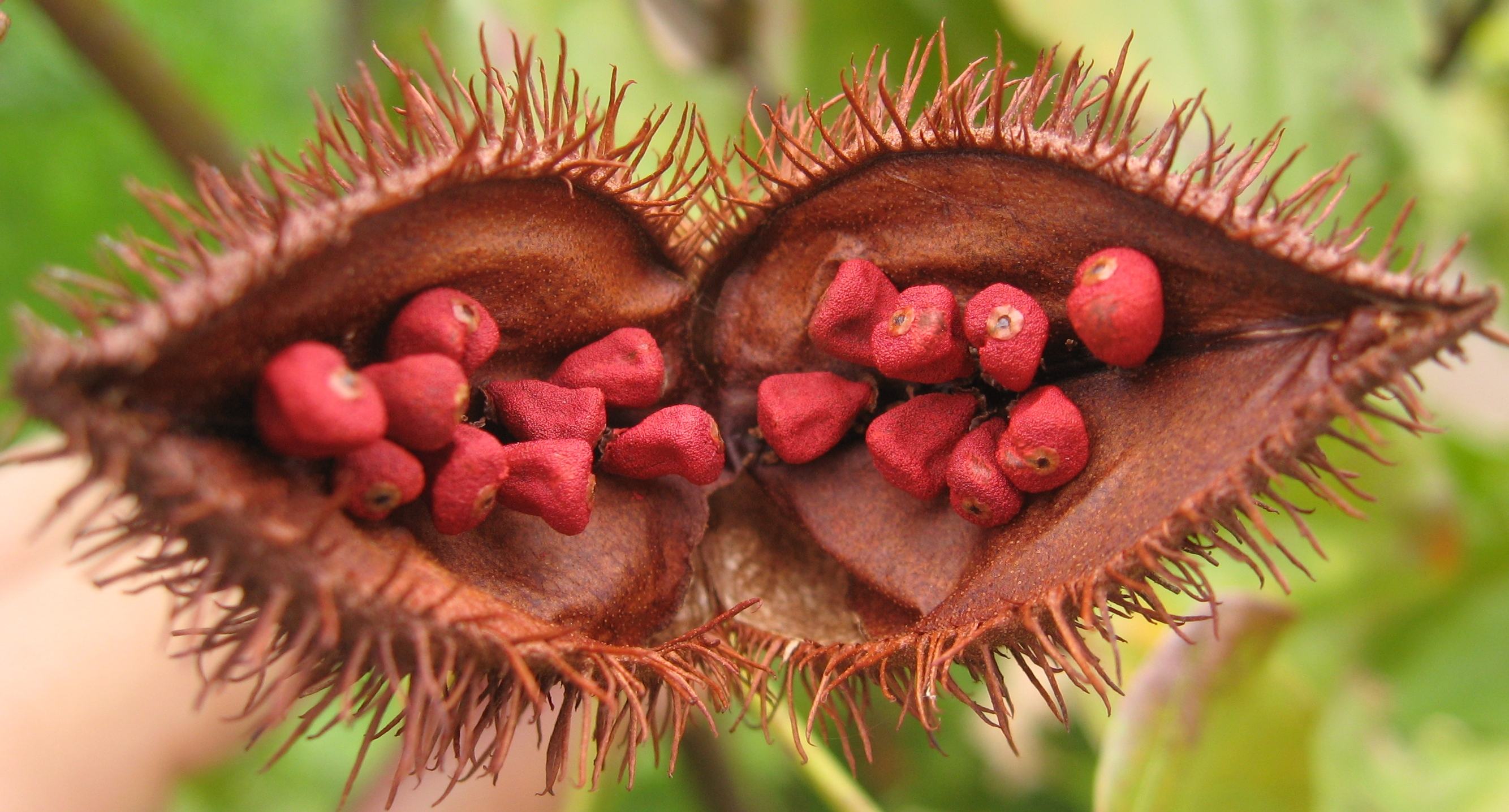
Open fruit of the achiote tree (Bixa orellana), showing the seeds from which annatto is extracted

Annatto (/əˈnætoʊ/ or /əˈnɑːtoʊ/) is an orange-red condiment and food coloring derived from the seeds of the achiote tree (Bixa orellana), native to tropical parts of the Americas. It is used to impart a yellow to red-orange color to foods, but may impart a sweet, peppery flavor.

The color of annatto comes from various carotenoid pigments, mainly bixin and norbixin, found in the reddish waxy coating of the seeds. The condiment is typically prepared by grinding the seeds to a powder or paste. Similar effects can be obtained by extracting some of the color and flavor principles from the seeds with hot water, oil, or lard, which are then added to the food.

Annatto and its extracts are widely used artisanally and industrially as a coloring agent in many processed food products, such as cheeses, dairy spreads, butter and margarine, custards, cakes and other baked goods, potatoes, snack foods, breakfast cereals, smoked fish, and sausages. In these uses, annatto is a natural alternative to synthetic food coloring compounds, but it has been linked to rare cases of food-related allergies.

== History ==
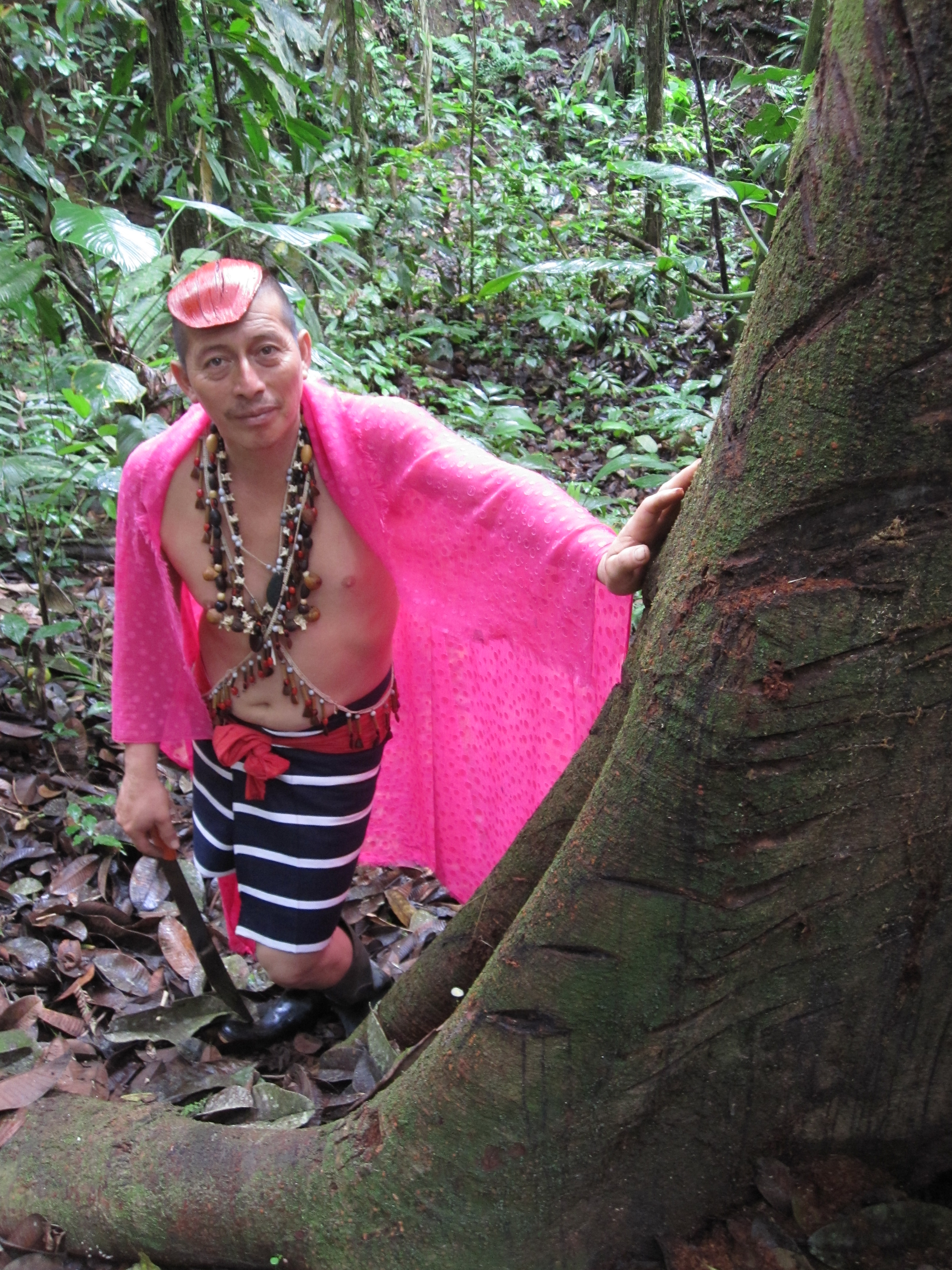
A Tsáchila man, with his hair colored with annatto

The annatto tree B. orellana is believed to originate in tropical regions from Mexico to Brazil. It was probably not initially used as a food additive, but for other purposes, such as ritual and decorative body painting (still an important tradition in many Brazilian native tribes, such as the Wari'), sunscreen, insect repellent, and for medical purposes. It was used for Mexican manuscript painting in the 16th century. Men of the Tsàchila tribe in Ecuador are highly recognizable thanks to their traditional bright orange hair, which is achieved by using crushed seeds of annatto. It is believed they have been doing so for centuries.

Annatto has been traditionally used as both a coloring and flavoring agent in various cuisines from Latin America, the Caribbean, the Philippines, and other countries where it was taken home by Spanish and Portuguese colonizers in the 16th century. It has various local names according to region. Its use has spread in historic times to other parts of the world, and it was incorporated in local culinary traditions of many countries outside the Americas.

== Culinary uses ==
=== Traditional cuisine ===
Ground annatto seeds, often mixed with other seeds or spices, are used in the form of paste or powder for culinary use, especially in Latin American, Jamaican, Belizean, Chamorro, Vietnamese, and Filipino cuisines. In Mexican and Belizean cuisines, it is used to make the spice recado rojo. In Venezuela, annatto is used in the preparation of hallacas, huevos pericos, and other traditional dishes. In Puerto Rico, it is often simmered in oil or ground with seasonings and herbs to make sazón or used to make pasteles, arroz con gandules, and several other dishes, where it is one of the main ingredients. Annatto paste is an important ingredient of cochinita pibil, the slow-roasted pork dish popular in Mexico. It is also a key ingredient in the drink tascalate from Chiapas, Mexico. In the Philippines, it is used for the sauce of pancit palabok.

Annatto may provide an earthy, sweet and peppery flavor.

=== Industrial food coloring ===
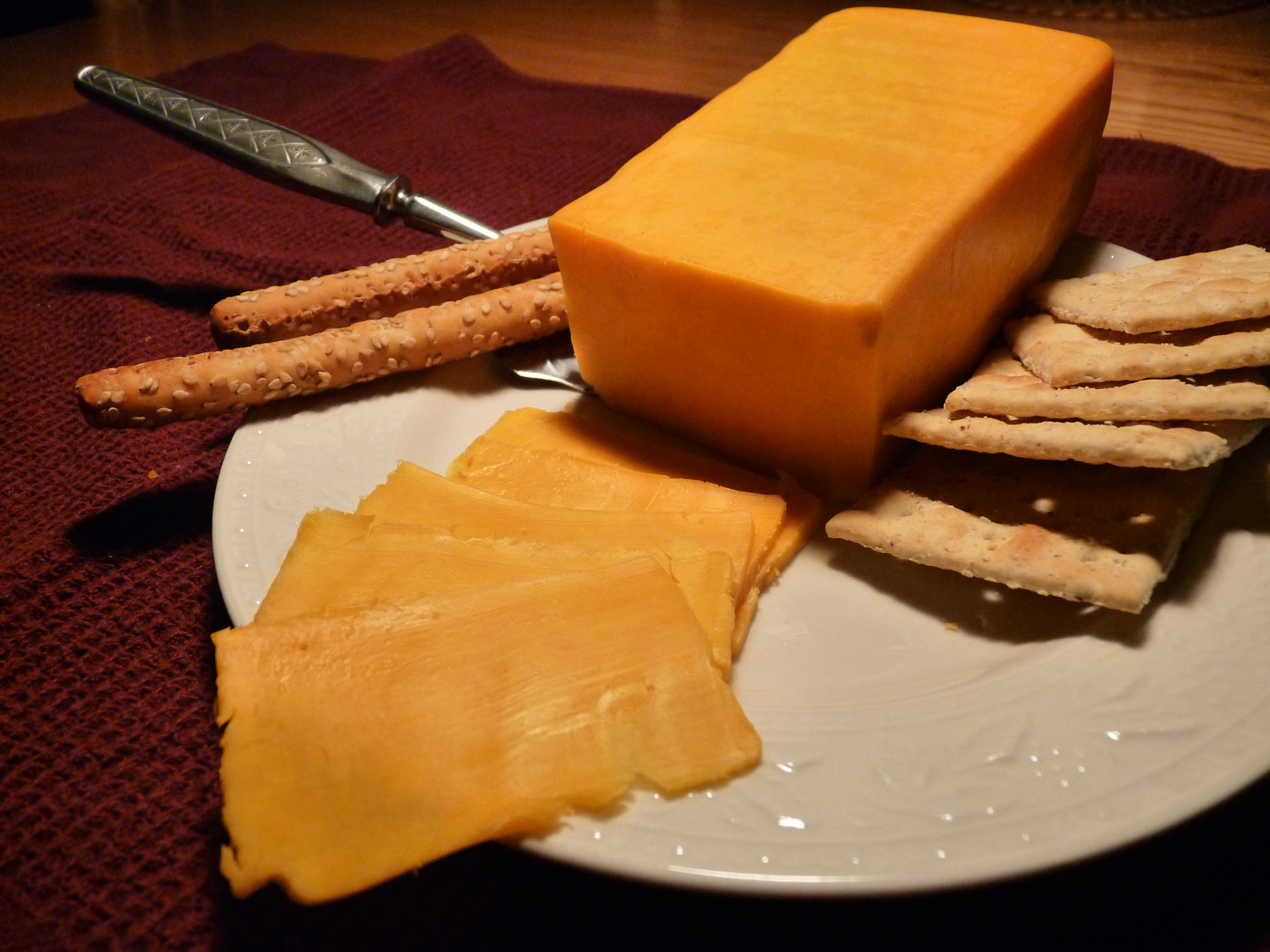
Colby cheese colored with annatto

Annatto is commonly used to impart a yellow or orange color to many industrialized and semi-industrialized foods, including cheese, ice cream, bakery products, desserts, fruit fillings, yogurt, butter, oils, margarines, processed cheese, and fat-based products. In the United States, annatto extract is listed as a color additive "exempt from certification" and is informally considered to be a natural coloring. Foods colored with annatto may declare the coloring in the statement of ingredients as "colored with annatto" or "annatto color". In the European Union, it is identified by the E number E160b.

=== Cheese ===
In cheese, the yellow and orange hues naturally vary throughout the year as the cow's feed changes: in the summer, with fresh grass and its natural carotene content, the milk produced would have a natural orange tint, as would the cheese made from it, while at other times of the year, the tint would be greatly reduced. As the pigment is carried in the cream, skimming the milk, which some farmers did to make butter or to sell it separately, the lesser-quality cheese from such milk would be white.

To fool the consumer, the cheesemakers introduced colorants to imitate the more intense colors of the finer summer cheese. Initially these colors came from saffron, marigold, and carrot juice, but later annatto came into use. While masking the white hues of the cheese during the winter was the primary reason, annatto was also used in cheeses like Red Leicester to stand out from popular cheddar cheeses and to make customers believe that the darker orange hues meant richer milk which in turn meant tastier cheese.

In the 17th century, the Dutch, who had established colonies in Guyana, traded in food, particularly an orange-red natural colorant, annatto, with the indigenous communities. Zeeland traders under the authority of the West India Company bought annatto from the inhabitants of the coastal regions of Guyana and Suriname and sold it in the Netherlands as verw ('paint'). One contemporaneous description comes from Adriaen van Berkel, in a book published in 1695, though he does not mention whether it was used in cheese.

The earliest known documentation of annatto's use in cheese is in a 1743 Dutch volume Huishoudelyk Woordboek (Household Dictionary), according to American scientist Paul Kindstedt of the University of Vermont. Other historical documents from the period confirm that annatto (then called "orleaan" or "orleans") was being used to color cheese by the mid-18th century.

England is another country that has used annatto to color its cheeses; colorants have been added to Gloucester cheese as early as the 16th century to allow inferior cheese to masquerade as the best Double Gloucester, with annatto later being used for that purpose. This usage was subsequently adopted in other parts of the UK, for cheeses such as Cheshire and Red Leicester, as well as colored Cheddar made in Scotland. Many cheddars are produced in both white and red (orange) varieties, the only difference between the two being the presence of annatto as a coloring. That practice has extended to many modern processed cheese products, such as American cheese and Velveeta. Cheeses from other countries also use annatto, including Mimolette from France and Leyden from the Netherlands.

Cheeses that use annatto in at least some preparations include:

- Cheddar (UK)
- Cheshire (UK)
- Colby (US)
- Gloucester (UK)
- Leyden (Netherlands)
- Livarot (France)
- Mimolette (France)
- Mont des Cats (France)
- Muenster (US)
- Red Leicester (UK)
- Saint Paulin (France)
- Shropshire Blue (UK)

== Chemical composition ==
Bixin, the major apocarotenoid of annatto

The yellow to orange color is produced by the chemical compounds bixin and norbixin, which are classified as carotenoids. The fat-soluble color in the crude extract is called bixin, which can then be saponified into water-soluble norbixin. This dual solubility property of annatto is rare for carotenoids. The seeds contain 4.5–5.5% pigment, which consists of 70–80% bixin. Unlike beta-carotene, another well-known carotenoid, annatto-based pigments are not vitamin A precursors. The more norbixin in an annatto preparation, the more yellow it is; a higher level of bixin gives it a more orange hue.

== Safety ==
As of 2025, the European Food Safety Authority does not list annatto among common food allergens. In 2009, annatto was not among the "Big Eight" substances causing the hypersensitivity reactions responsible for more than 90% of food-related allergic reactions.

A 2025 review reported that annatto condiments and colorants are safe for most people when used in typical food amounts, but rarely may cause allergic reactions, such as hives and possibly anaphylaxis.
