= Houben-Weyl Methods of Organic Chemistry =

Chemistry encyclopedia established by Theodor Weyl

Houben-Weyl Methods of Organic Chemistry (Ger. Methoden der Organischen Chemie) established in 1909 by the German chemist Theodor Weyl, is a classic chemistry text. It consisted initially of two volumes and covered literature published as early as 1834. Heinrich J. Houben revised and reissued it in 1913. It is considered one of the most significant resources for chemists.

Up to the 4th edition the work was published in German by Thieme from 1952 to 1987, with supplementary volumes published between 1982 and 1999, some of them (from 1990 on) in English. It consists of 16 volumes, some of which are further divided. Overall, the 4th edition consists of 90 individual books.

A new English-language edition was published by Thieme from 2000 to 2010 as Science of Synthesis in 48 volumes. It is constantly updated.
