= Linderatin =

Skin whitening agent

Identifiers
- IUPAC name: 3-Phenyl-1-[2,4,6-trihydroxy-3-(3-methyl-6-propan-2-ylcyclohex-2-en-1-yl)phenyl]propan-1-one
- PubChem CID: 353260
- ChemSpider: 10258971

Chemical and physical data
- Formula: C_{25}H_{30}O_{4}
- Molar mass: 394.511 g·mol^{−1}
- 3D model (JSmol): Interactive image
- SMILES: CC1=CC(C(CC1)C(C)C)C2=C(C(=C(C=C2O)O)C(=O)CCC3=CC=CC=C3)O
- InChI: InChI=1S/C25H30O4/c1-15(2)18-11-9-16(3)13-19(18)23-21(27)14-22(28)24(25(23)29)20(26)12-10-17-7-5-4-6-8-17/h4-8,13-15,18-19,27-29H,9-12H2,1-3H3; Key:GHISAUFWVUOBIR-UHFFFAOYSA-N

Linderatin is a naturally occurring meroterpene compound first isolated from the leaves of Lindera umbellata, a plant known for its aromatic and medicinal properties within the Lauraceae family.

Structurally, linderatin is classified as a dihydrochalcone derivative, featuring a unique combination of phenolic and terpenoid elements. The compound has also been identified in other plant species, such as Piper aduncum, and is notable for its rarity among naturally occurring phytochemicals. While Linderatin is closely related to cannabidiol (CBD) in structure, it is not considered a phytocannabinoid, and its biological activities are still under investigation. Synthetic routes for Linderatin have been developed, further enabling the exploration of its potential pharmacological applications, including reported cytotoxic activity against certain cancer cell lines.

== Synthesis ==

The Hoesch reaction between hydrocinnamonitrile (2-phenylethylcyanide; 1) with phloroglucinol (2) gives 3-phenylpropanoyl-phloroglucinol (3). Treatment with menthadiene (alpha-phellandrene; 4) completes the synthesis of linderatin (5).

== See also ==
- Cannabidiol
- Flopropione
