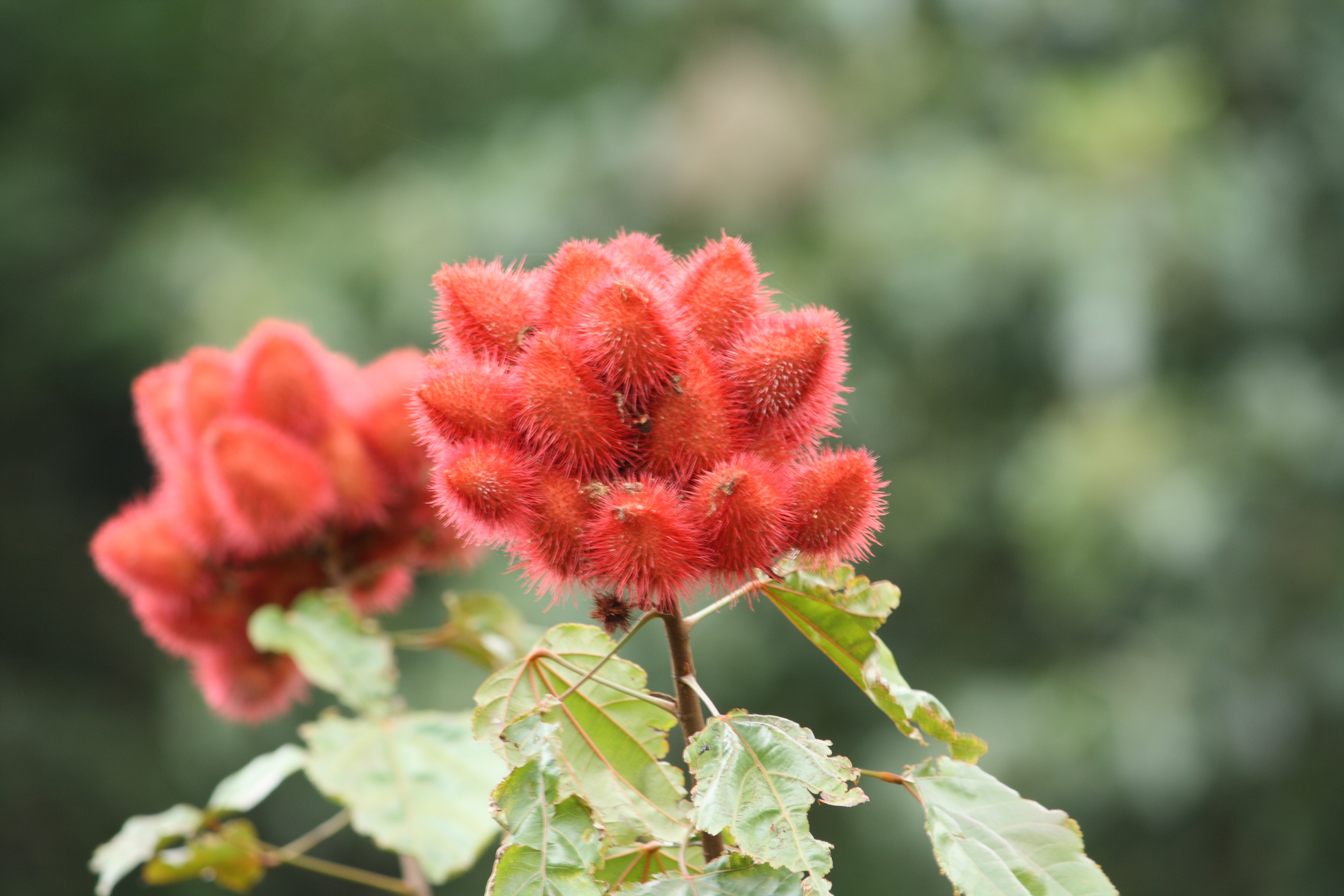
- Achiote seed pods

Conservation status
- Least Concern (IUCN 3.1)

Scientific classification
- Kingdom: Plantae
- Clade: Embryophytes
- Clade: Tracheophytes
- Clade: Spermatophytes
- Clade: Angiosperms
- Clade: Eudicots
- Clade: Rosids
- Order: Malvales
- Family: Bixaceae
- Genus: Bixa
- Species: B. orellana

Binomial name
- Bixa orellana L.

Synonyms
- Bixa tinctaria Salisb.; Orellana orellana (L.) Kuntze; Bixa orleana Noronha; Bixa americana Poir.; Bixa purpurea Sweet; Bixa odorata Ruiz & Pav. ex G.Don; Bixa acuminata Bojer; Orellana americana (Poir.) Kuntze; Bixa upatensis Ram.Goyena; Bixa katangensis Delpierre

= Bixa orellana =

Achiote

Species of plant

Bixa orellana, also known as achiote, is a shrub or small tree native to Mexico and Central and South America. Bixa orellana is grown in many countries worldwide.

The plant is best known as the source of annatto, a natural orange-red condiment (also called achiote or bijol) obtained from the waxy arils that cover its seeds. The ground seeds are widely used in traditional dishes in Central and South America, Mexico, and the Caribbean, such as cochinita pibil, chicken in achiote, caldo de olla, and nacatamal. Annatto and its extracts are also used as an industrial food coloring to add yellow or orange color to many products such as butter, cheese, margarine, ice creams, meats, and condiments. Some of the indigenous peoples of North, Central, and South America originally used the seeds to make red body paint and lipstick, as well as a spice. For this reason, the Bixa orellana is sometimes called the lipstick tree.

== Etymology and common names ==
The name Bixa orellana was given by Linnaeus. The botanical genus name derives from the aboriginal Taíno word "bixa", while the specific epithet was derived in honor of the Amazon explorer Francisco de Orellana, an early explorer of the Amazon River. The name achiote derives from the Nahuatl word for the shrub, āchiotl [aːˈt͡ʃiot͡ɬ]. It may also be referred to as aploppas, or by its original Tupi name uruku, urucu or urucum ("red color"), which is also used for the body paint prepared from its seeds. Colloquial names include bija, roucou, orellana, annatto, achiote, and many other names used regionally. The nickname, "lipstick tree", derived from use of the dye as a cosmetic.

== Description ==
Bixa orellana is a perennial, tall shrub to small evergreen tree that can reach 6–10 m (20–33 ft) high. It bears clusters of 5 cm (2 in) bright white or pink flowers, resembling single wild roses, that appear at the tips of the branches. The fruits of the Bixa orellana are globular, ovoid capsules arranged in clusters resembling spiky looking red-brown seed pods covered in soft spines. Each capsule, or pod, contains 30–45 cone-shaped seeds covered in a thin waxy blood-red aril. When fully mature, the pod dries, hardens, and splits open, thereby exposing the seeds.

The plant is most well known as the source of the red-orange annatto pigment. The pigment is derived from the waxy aril layer that covers the seeds of the Bixa orellana fruit. The red-orange annatto dye is rich in the carotenoid pigments, 80% which consists of bixin (the red pigment) and norbixin or orelline (the yellow pigment). Annatto oil contains tocotrienols, beta-carotene, essential oils, saturated and unsaturated fatty acids, flavonoids, and vitamin C.

== Genomics ==
A chromosome-scale genome assembly of Bixa orellana was published in 2026. The assembled genome size is approximately 270 Mb and includes 10 chromosome-scale superscaffolds representing 96.4% of the assembly. The assembly showed a BUSCO completeness of 98.6%, and approximately 56,000 transcripts were annotated. The genome was generated to facilitate studies of genes involved in bixin biosynthesis and regulation.

== Distribution ==
Although the exact origin of Bixa orellana is unknown, it is native to northern South America and the Central American tropics: "it is said to be indigenous by Seemann on the northwest coast of Mexico and Panama, by Triana in New Granada, by Meyer in Dutch Guiana, and by Piso and Claussen in Brazil". Additionally, Bixa orellana is found in substantial wild and cultivated acreages from Mexico to Ecuador, Brazil, and Bolivia. Although an invasive species, it is cultivated in many world regions.

During the 16th and 17th centuries, the annatto dye was distributed to Southeast Asia, Africa, the Caribbean, Hawaii and southeastern North America in tropical and subtropical regions through trading exchanges. It became cultivated in tropical regions of Asia, such as India, Sri Lanka, and Java mainly for the dye which the seeds yield.

== Cultivation ==
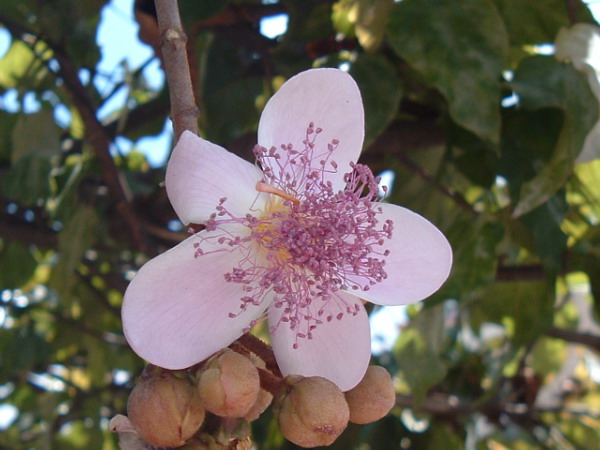
Achiote flower

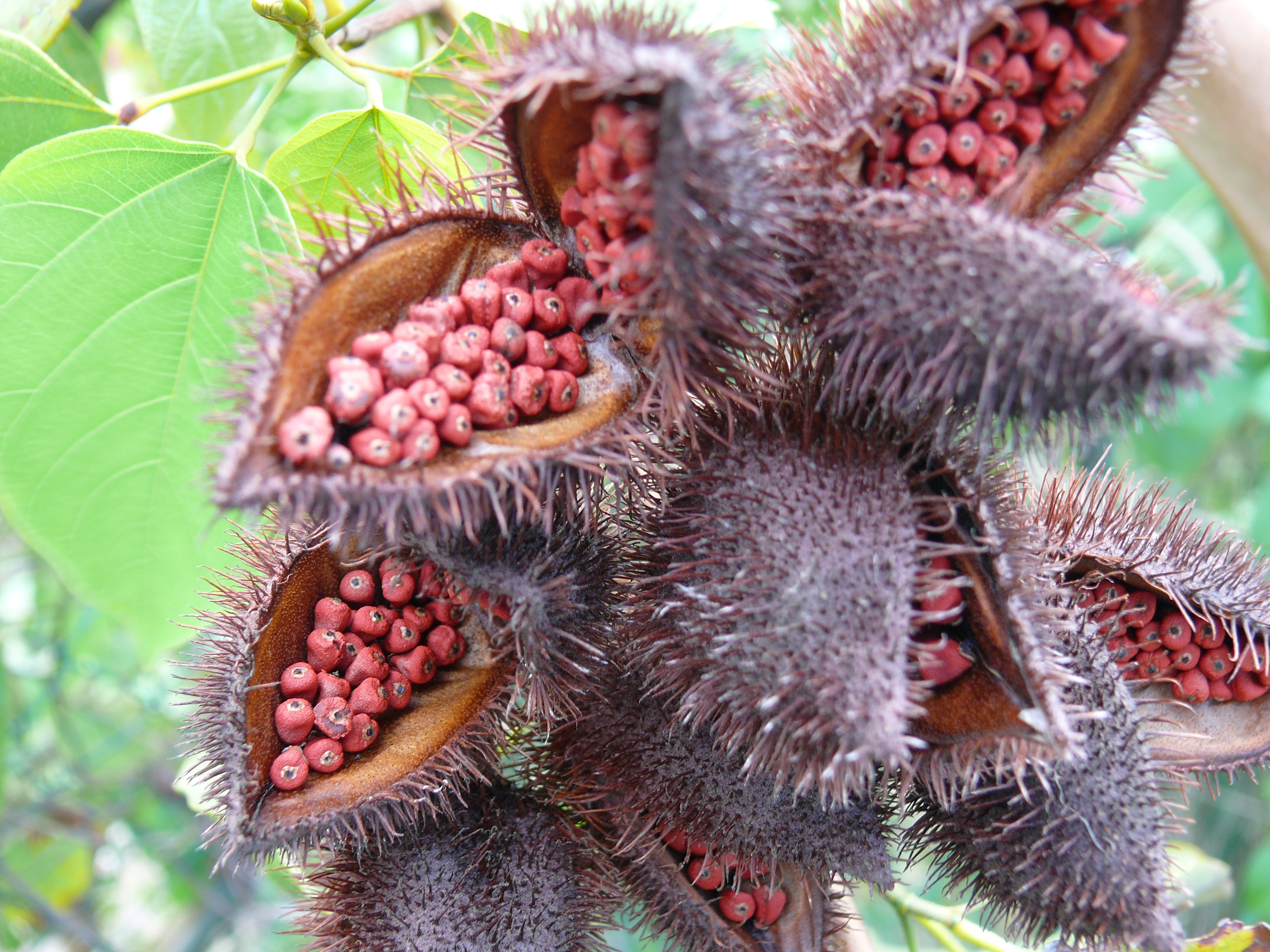
Mature achiote pods, showing the red seeds

Bixa orellana grows easily in subtropical to tropical climates, in frost-free regions sheltered from cool winds. It prefers year-round moisture, good drainage, and moderately fertile soil in full sun or partial shade. It can be propagated from seed and cuttings. Cutting-grown plants flower at a younger age than seedlings.

The main commercial producers of B. orellana are countries in Latin America (specifically Peru, Brazil and Mexico), which constitute 60% of total world production followed by Africa (27% of total world production) and Asia (12% of total world production). Production statistics are not usually available and would not provide a reliable guide to international trade, since many of the producing countries use significant quantities domestically (e.g., Brazil is a large producer and consumer, needing additional imports). Annual world production of dried annatto seed at the beginning of the 21st century was estimated at 10,000 tons, of which 7,000 tons enter international trade. Peru is the largest exporter of annatto seed, annually about 4,000 tons; Brazil the largest producer, with about 5,000 tons. Kenya exports annually about 1,500 tons annatto seed and extracts and is the second-largest exporter, after Peru. Côte d'Ivoire, Angola, and the Philippines are also exporters.

== Industrial uses ==
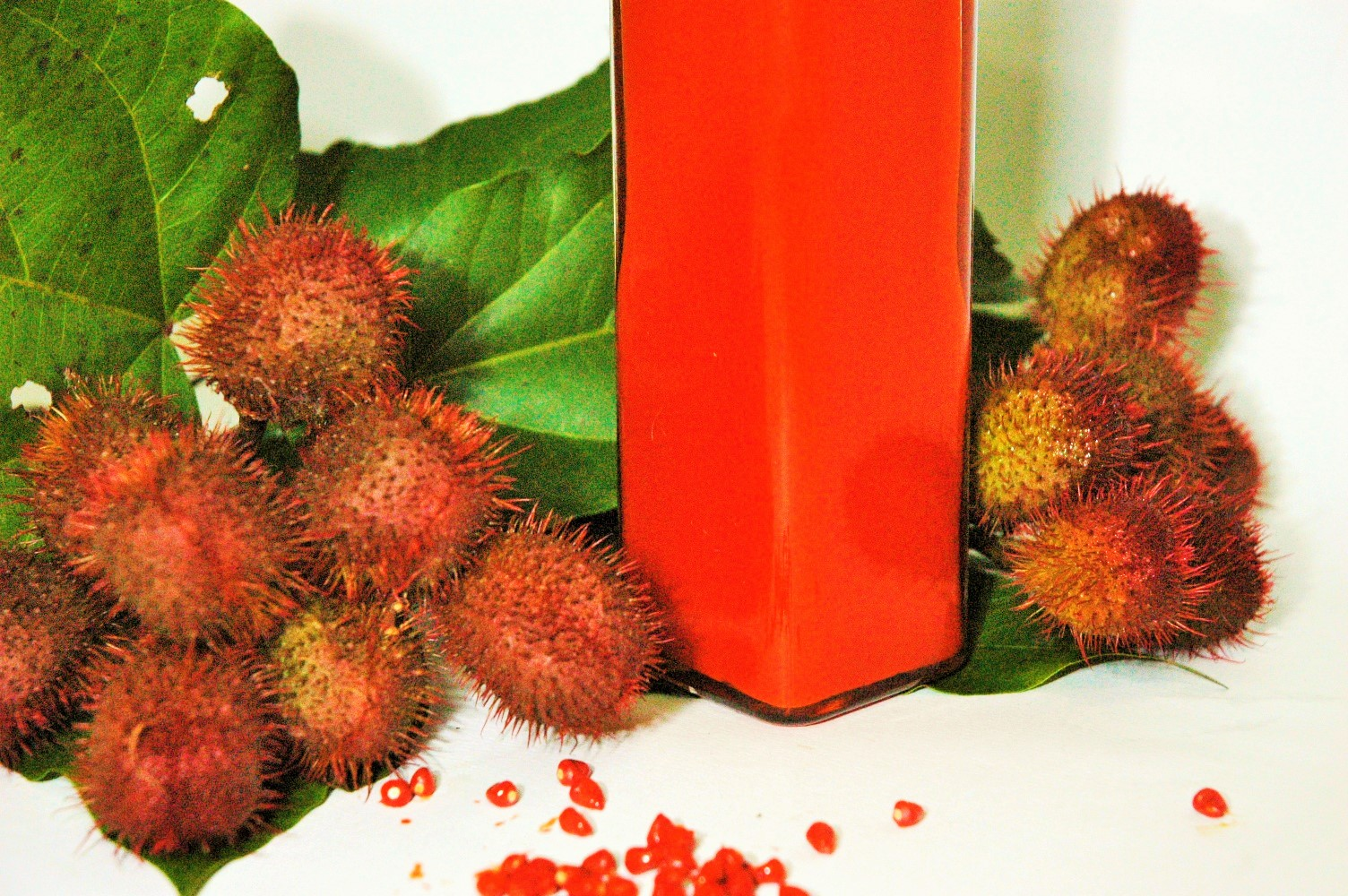
Oil of Bixa orellana

Before synthetic dyes revolutionized industry, Bixa orellana (which is the only plant to produce the pigment bixin) was planted commercially. The pigment is extracted from the pericarp of the seeds through use of alkaline water, vegetable oil, or organic solvents.

The annatto pigment has global economic significance, as it is one of the most widely used natural dyes to color food, cosmetics and pharmaceutical products. It is used commonly in foods because the coloring does not alter the flavor and is not toxic, though it may trigger allergic reactions in those who are sensitive. It is mainly used to dye ice cream, meats, dairy products (cheeses, butter and margarine) and condiments. Cosmetic products include lipstick, hair coloring products, nail polish, soaps, lacquers and paints.

== Culinary uses ==
Ground Bixa orellana seeds are often mixed with other seeds or spices to form a paste or powder for culinary uses in Latin American, Jamaican, Chamorro, and Filipino cuisines. The seeds are heated in oil or lard to extract their dye and flavor for use in dishes and processed foods such as cheese, butter, soup, gravy, sauces, cured meats, and other items. The seeds impart a subtle flavor and aroma and a yellow to reddish-orange color to food.

A condiment called sazón is commonly used in Spanish, Latin American, and Caribbean cuisine for meats and fish. The Spanish word sazón means "season" or "seasoning". Sazón is made with ground Bixa orellana seeds and packaged into small, disposable foil packets for easy use. Additionally, cumin, coriander seeds, salt, and garlic powder are included in these sazón condiment packets.

On Spanish-speaking Caribbean islands, the annatto pigment is also used to make yellow rice and is sometimes added to sofrito. Additionally, in the French Caribbean, it is added to a fish or pork stew called blaff.

In Brazil, a powder known as colorau or colorífico is made from the ground seeds combined with filler seeds like maize. This powder is similar to and sometimes replaces paprika. In Nicaragua, the most common way achiote is used in their cuisine and dishes is in the form of a paste. It is used in many national dishes, such as chancho con yuca, nacatamal, and fritanga. The Yucatecan condiment called recado rojo, or "achiote paste", is made from ground Bixa orellana seeds combined with other spices and is a mainstay in Mexican and Belizean cuisines.

== Traditional uses ==
One major traditional use of the Bixa orellana plant was for body, face, and hair paint among various tribes and ancient civilizations either for decorative purposes or as omens to ward off evil spirits and illnesses. It has been reported to be used by Brazilian native tribes, the native Taínos in Puerto Rico, the Tsáchila of Ecuador and different Amazonian tribes. As a result of the Spanish Conquest, the Bixa orellana was introduced to peoples like the Aztecs, Incas and Mochicas, who showed evidence of later use. The Aztecs also apparently used the annatto pigment as red ink for manuscript painting in the 16th century.

Bixa orellana is used in traditional medicine. The tree has been used in Ayurveda, the folk medicine practices of India, where different parts of the plant are thought to be useful as therapy.

The plant is valued for its stem fiber to make rope mats and for the adhesive gum.

== Gallery ==
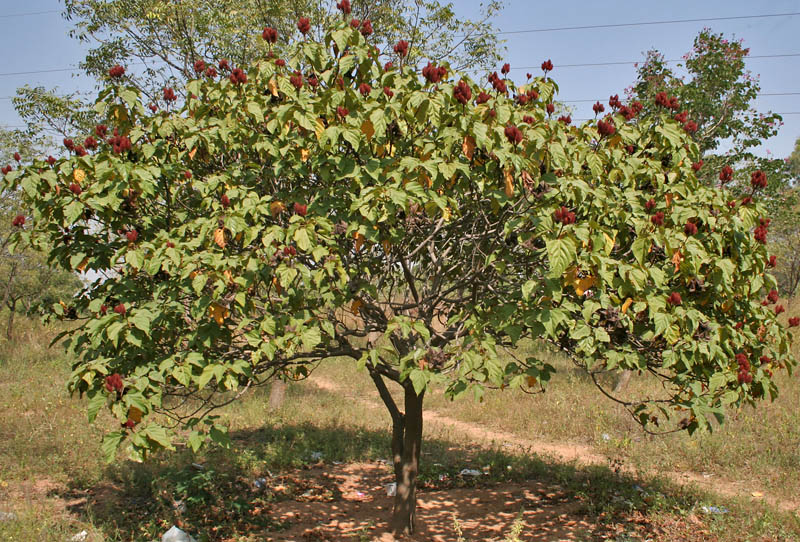
With fruits in Hyderabad, India

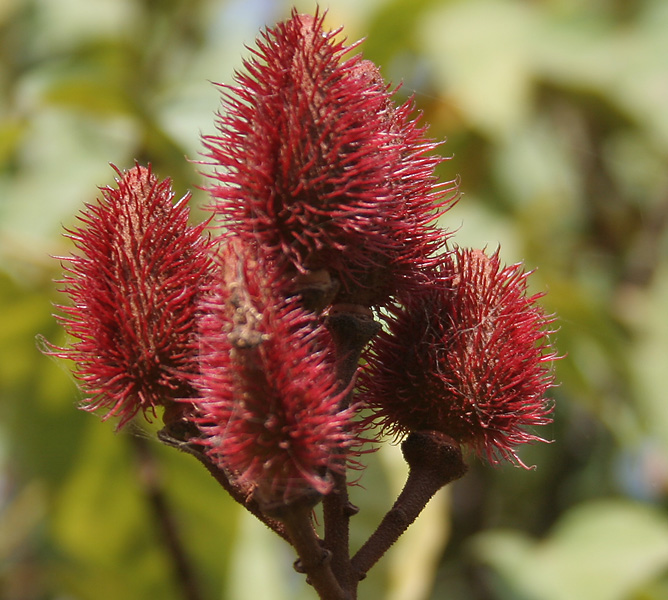
Fruit in Hyderabad, India

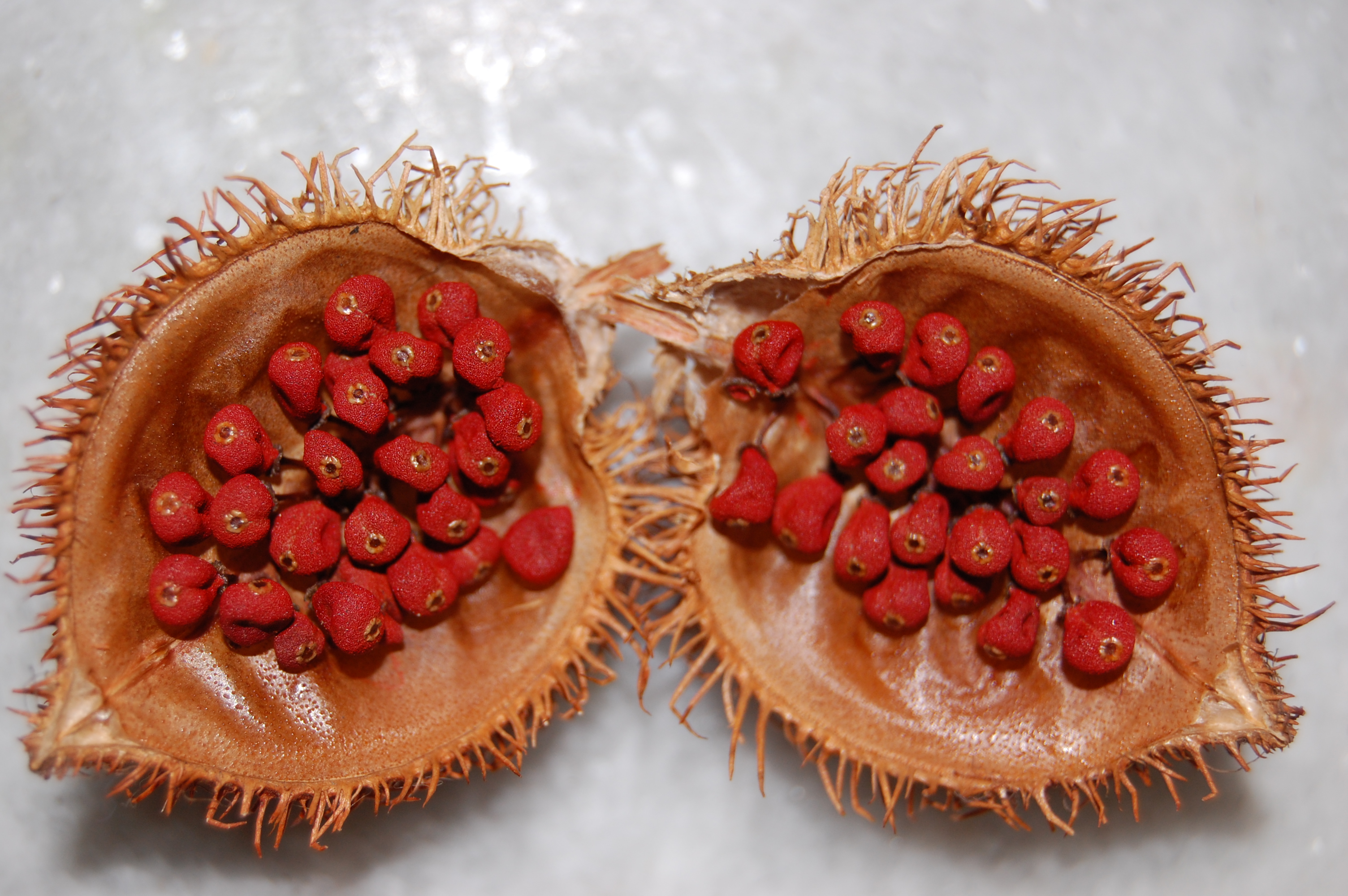
Split seed pod

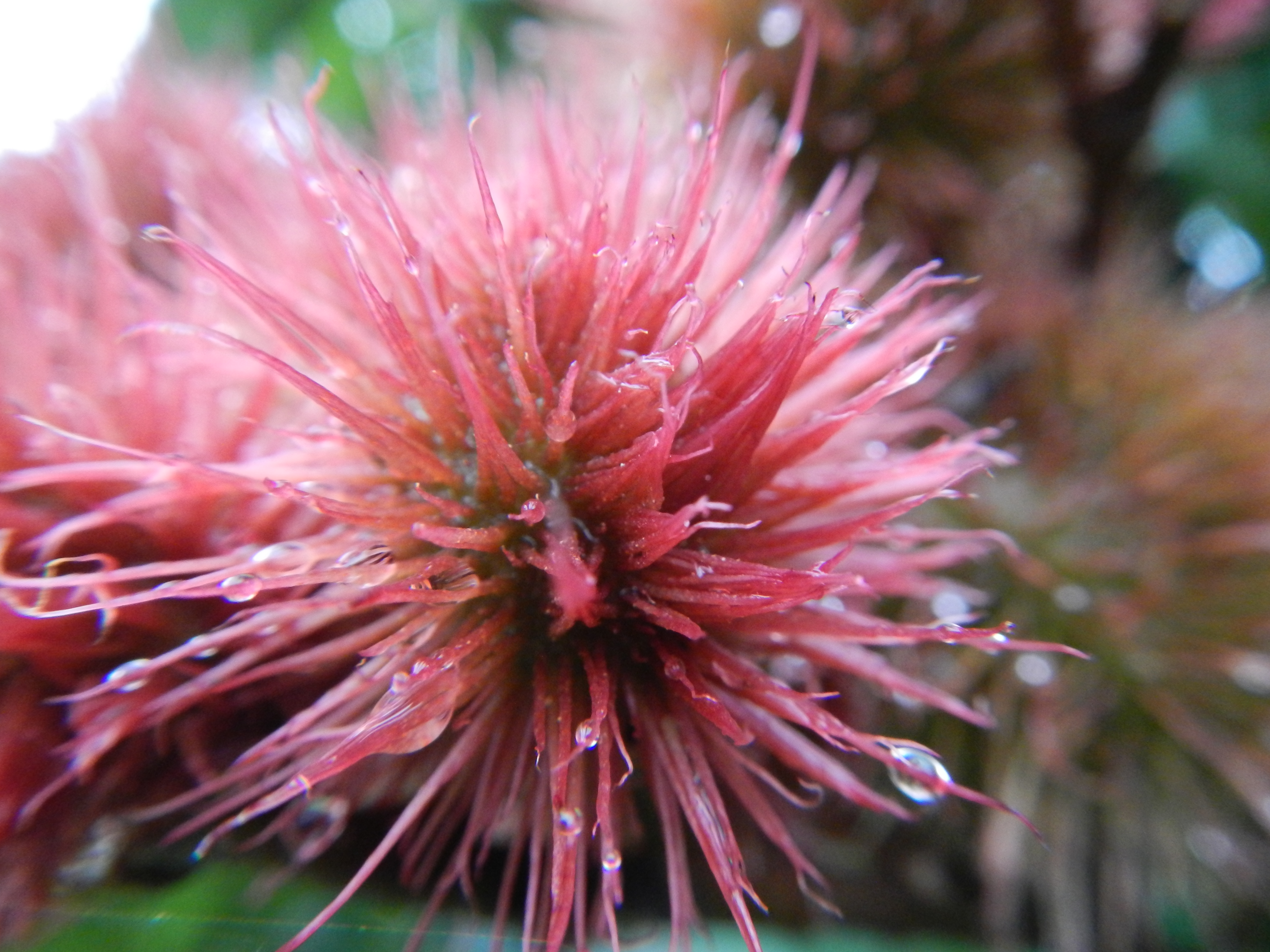
Seed pod closeup

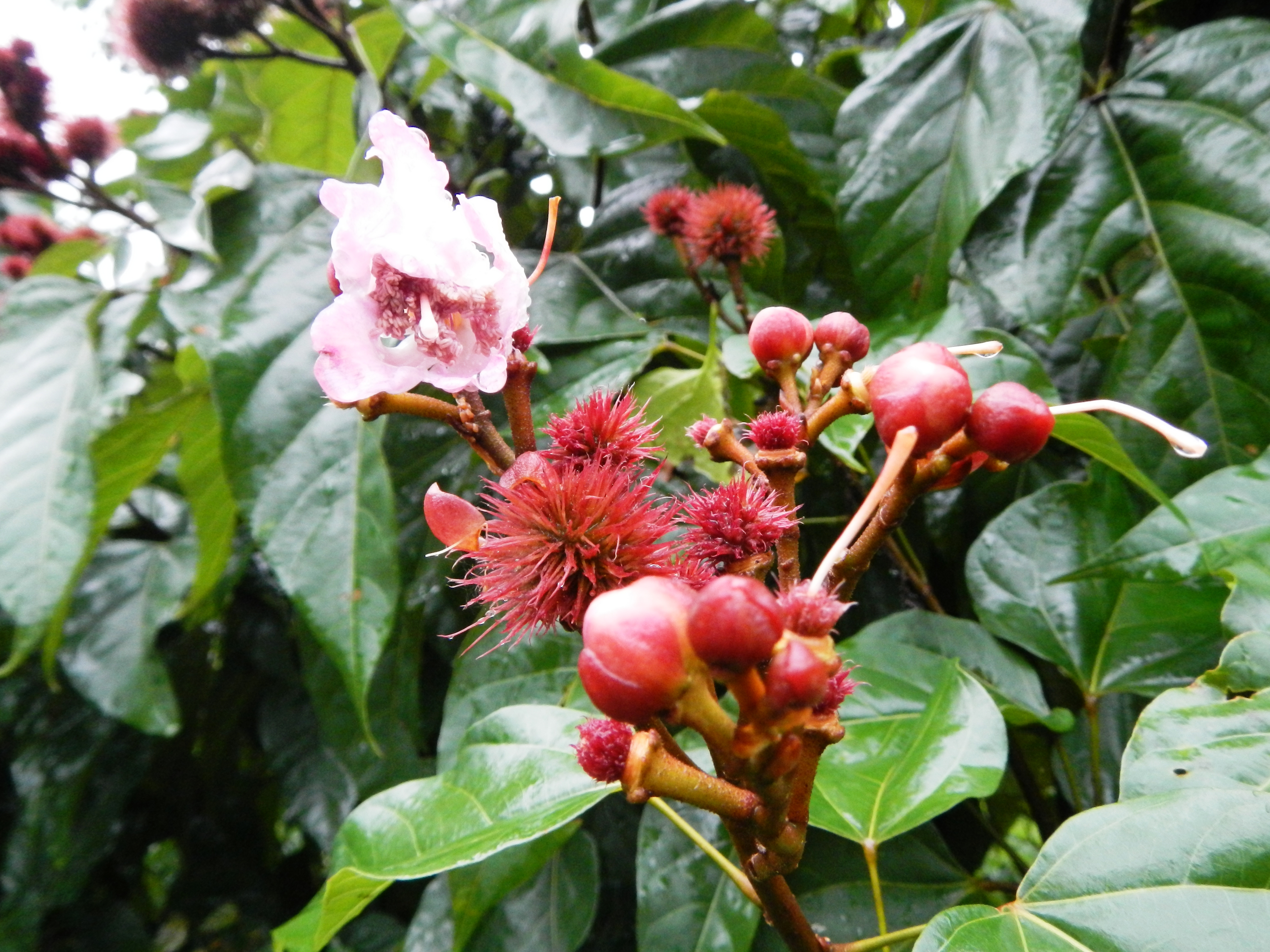
Fruit

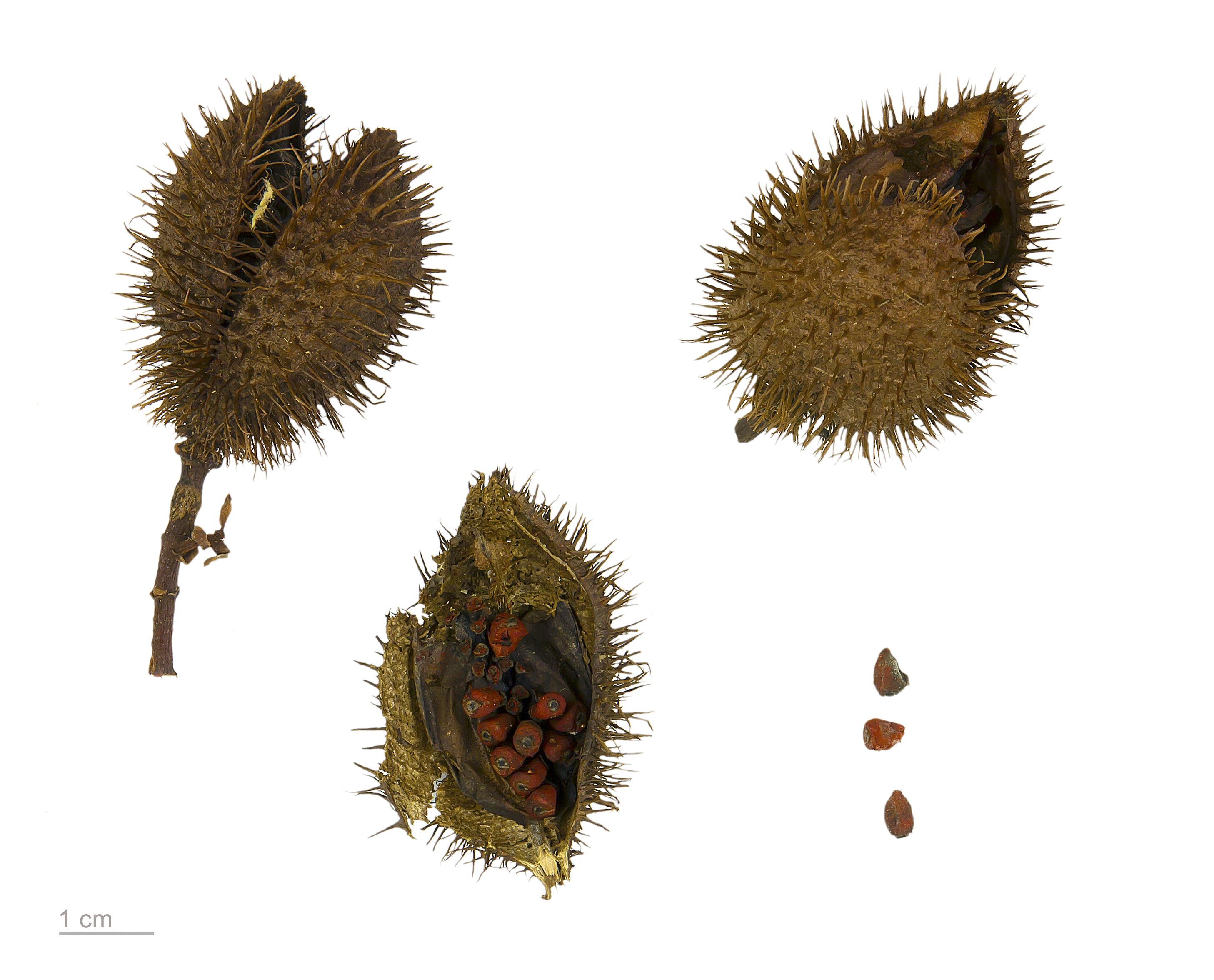
Bixa orellana – MHNT

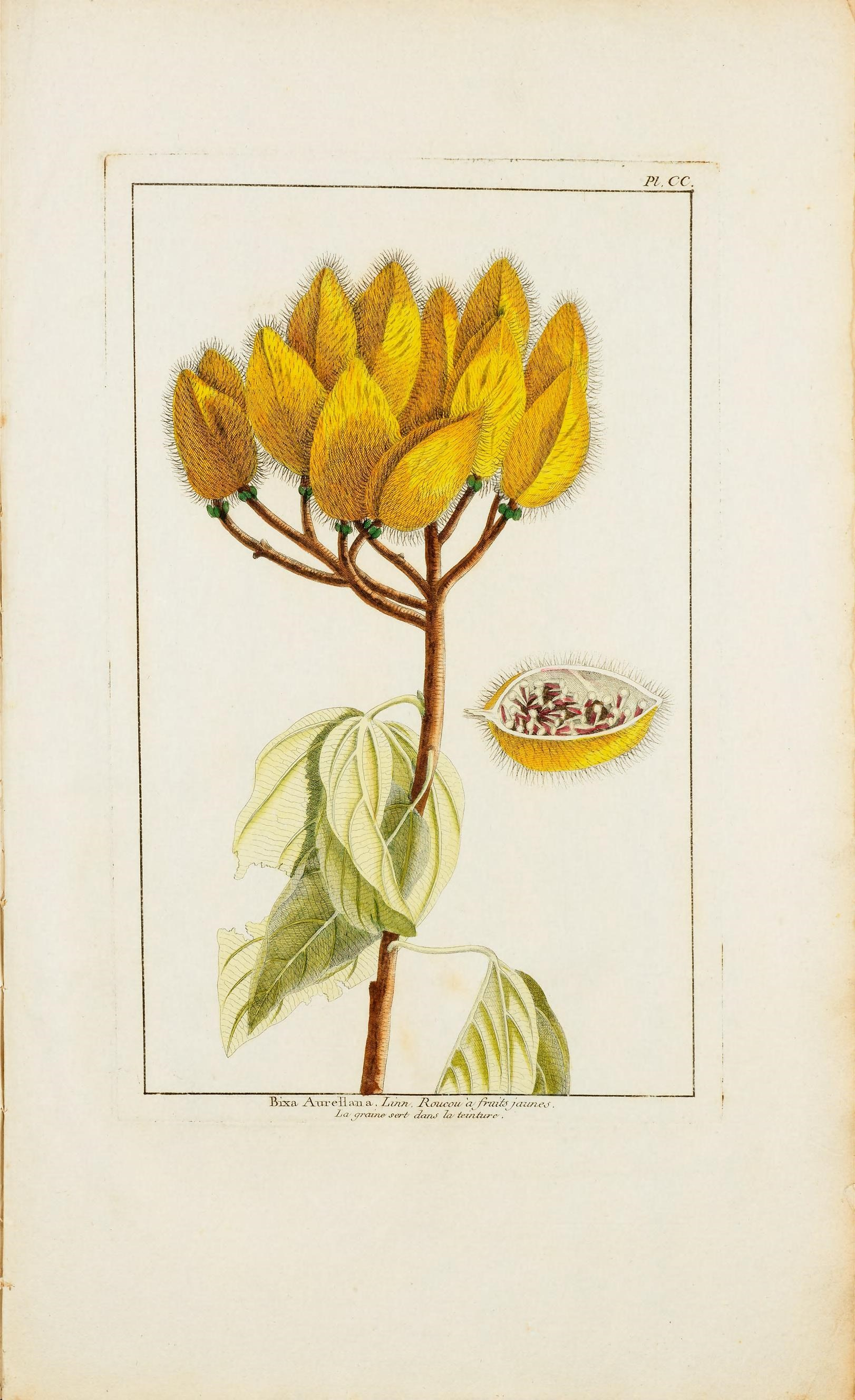
Illustration of fruit and seed
