= Leyden cheese =

Semi-hard Dutch cow's milk cheese with cumin and caraway

Leyden cheese Leidse kaas (Dutch)
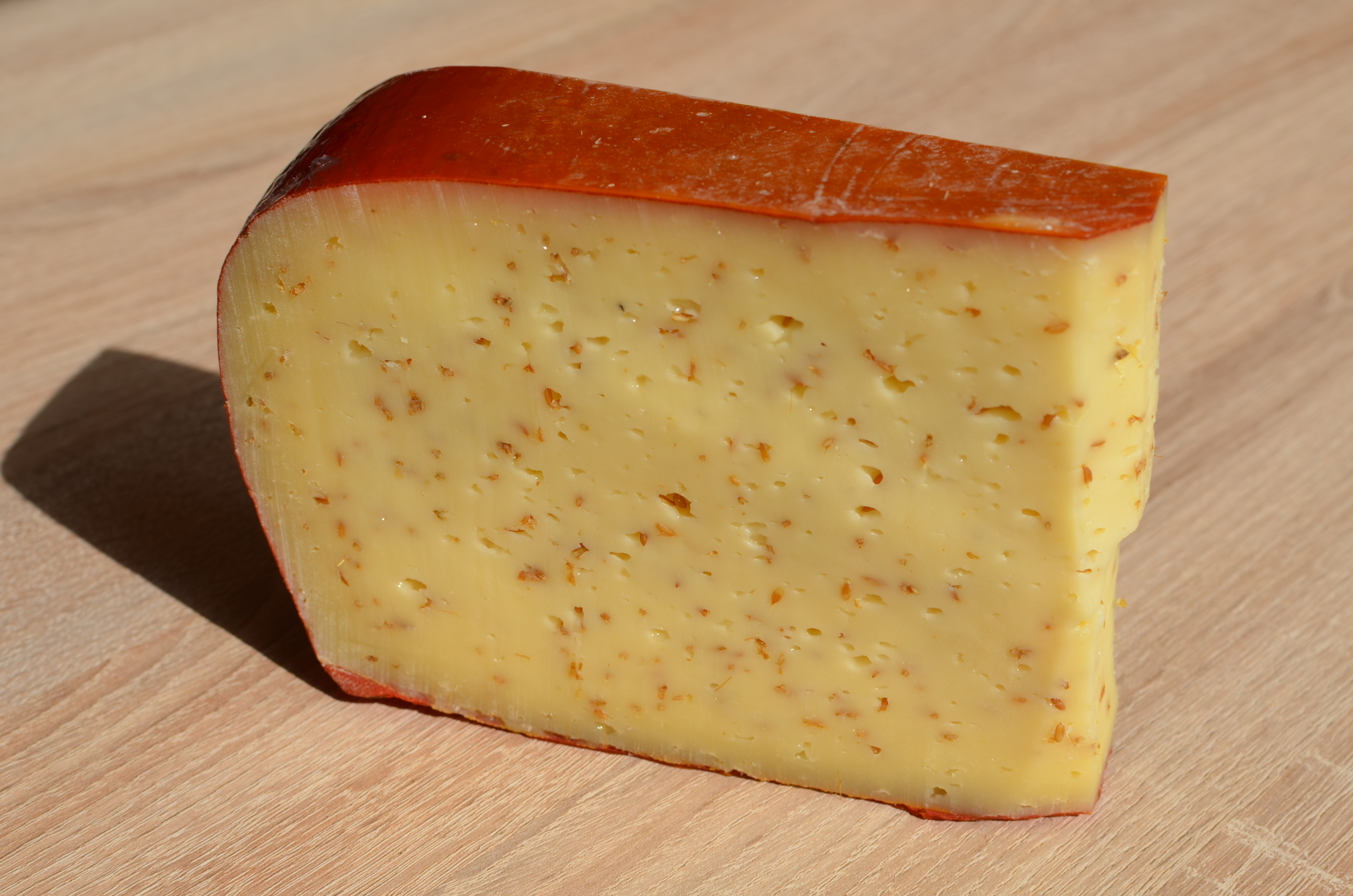
- Country of origin: Netherlands
- Region: Leiden
- Source of milk: Cows
- Pasteurised: Yes
- Texture: Hard
- Fat content: 30–40%
- Weight: 3 kg (6.6 lb) to 9 kg (20 lb)
- Certification: PDO 1997
- Named after: Leiden

Leyden, from Dutch: Leidse kaas, is a semi-hard, cumin and caraway seed flavoured cheese made in the Netherlands from cow's milk. It is made both in factories and on farms, historically in the Leiden area.

Leidse kaas is the most common type of komijnekaas—cheese that includes cumin as an ingredient—in the Netherlands. The cheese is round and flat like Gouda cheese; however, it is made with sharp edges on one side and less roundness to its side. It has a fat percentage of 30% to 40%, and can weigh between 3 kg (6.6 lb) and 9 kg (20 lb).

== Production ==
On the farms, about 5% of buttermilk may be added to the milk, and it is set with rennet at a temperature of 28 °C (82 °F) to 30 °C (86 °F). About 30 minutes later, the curd is cut with a harp, stirred, and warmed to about 33 °C (91 °F) by pouring in hot whey. The curd is dipped with a cloth and kneaded. Cumin seeds are added to a portion of the curd, and the curd is then put into cloth-lined hoops in three layers, with the spiced curd as the middle layer. The cheese is pressed for about three hours, then it is redressed, inverted, and again pressed overnight. It may be salted with dry salt, or it may be immersed in a brine bath. It is cured in a cool, moist cellar. If the rind becomes too hard, it is washed with whey or salty water.

== Origin ==
Traditionally, the farms in the Netherlands produced butter for the local markets. Butter had to be produced locally as it spoiled quickly. This resulted in a byproduct of semi-skimmed (part skim) milk, which was usually fed to calves, as it was of limited value. Another way to use the milk was to produce low-fat cheese. Low-fat cheeses could be preserved better than full-cream cheese (such as Gouda), especially at higher temperatures. Farmers in the area near Leiden added cumin seeds and used to colour their cheeses using annatto, which gives the cheese its red color.

Traditional farm-made Leidse kaas made in the west of the Netherlands is an EU and UK Protected Designation of Origin named Boeren-Leidse met sleutels. The addition met sleutels ('with keys') stems from the city of Leiden's coat of arms, which bears a set of keys.

A typical analysis of the cheese is: moisture 40.6%, fat 13.5% and protein, 37.3%.

== See also ==
- List of cheeses – List of cheeses by place of origin
