= Josef Houben =

German chemist (1875–1940)

- Born: 27 October 1875; Waldfeucht, Germany
- Died: 28 June 1940 (aged 64); Tübingen Germany
- Known for: discovery of the Houben-Hoesch reaction coauthor of the text book Houben-Weyl Methods of Organic Chemistry
- Scientific career
- Fields: organic chemistry
- Doctoral advisor: Julius Bredt

Heinrich Hubert Maria Josef Houben (27 October 1875, in Waldfeucht (Rheinland) Germany – 28 June 1940, in Tübingen) was a German chemist. He made achievements within ketone synthesis, terpenes, and camphor studies. After being wounded several times on the front lines in World War I, Houben was made head of the war laboratory. He improved the Hoesch reaction which is now normally called Houben-Hoesch reaction. Houben organized and made a major rework of the book Methods of Organic Chemistry which is now referred to as Houben-Weyl Methods of Organic Chemistry.

== Life ==
Houben studied at the University of Bonn and changed his subjects from mathematics and astronomy to chemistry under the influence of August Kekulé. He received his Ph.D. for work with Julius Bredt in 1898, and they collaborated on the initial 1902 publication of what became known as Bredt's Rule. After some time at the University of Aachen and University of Bonn Houben joined the laboratory of Emil Fischer at the University of Berlin. After his habilitation in 1908 he stayed in Berlin until the beginning of World War I. Houben served in the army and after being wounded several times he became head of the war laboratory. After the war Houben became professor at the Biologische Reichsanstalt in Berlin Dahlem in 1921, a position he held until his forced retirement in 1933. Houben died in Tübingen in 1940.

== Work ==
During his time with Emil Fischer his research was focused on the Organomagnesium compounds, while in his time at the Biologischen Reichsanstalt Houben was improving the already known Hoesch reaction.
