= Recado rojo =

Spice blend

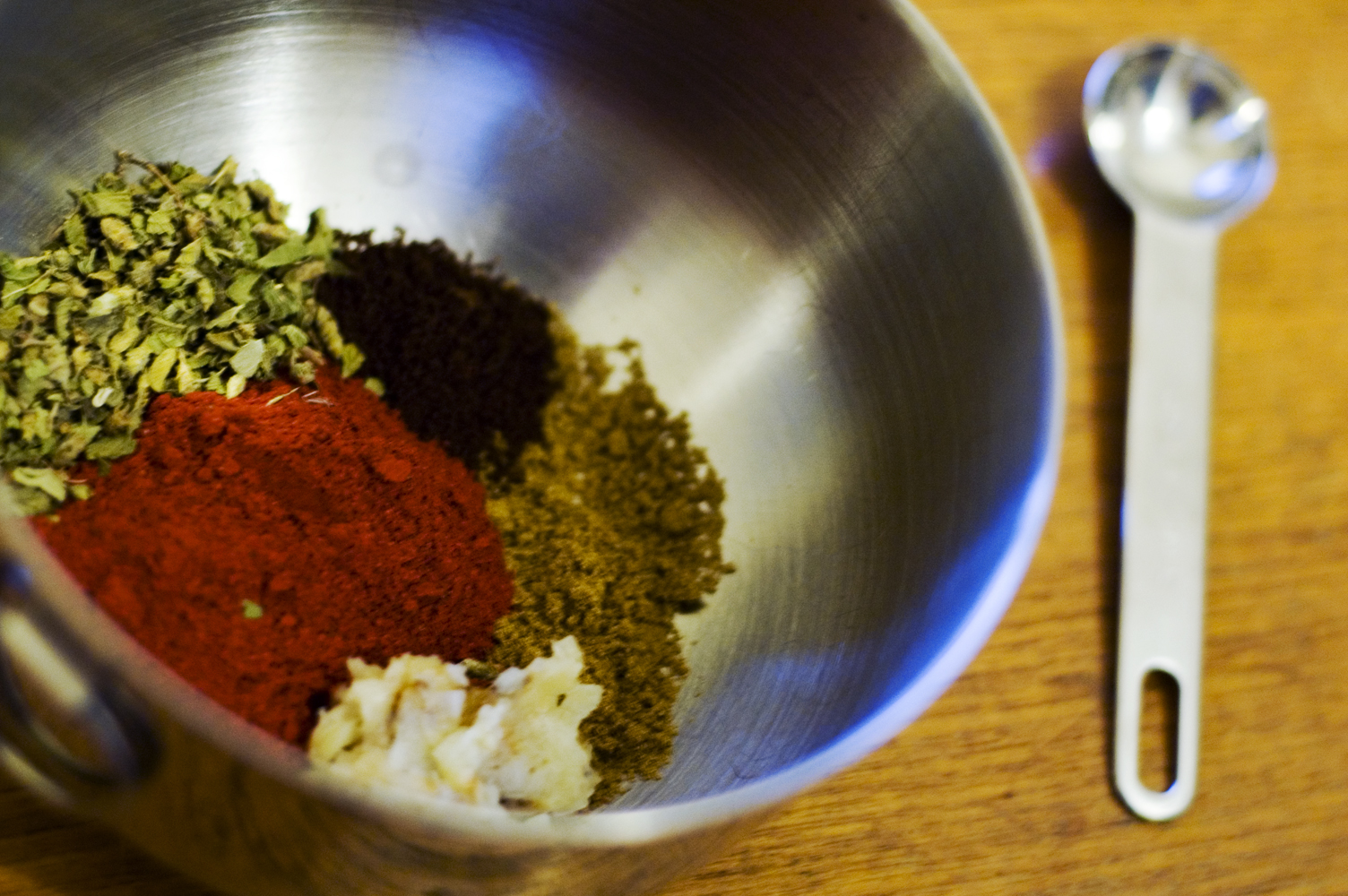
Recado (chili paste) ingredients

Recado is a culinary paste historically associated with Mayan cuisine. It can have a variety of colors and flavors ranging from mild to spicy, sweet, or piquant. It is most commonly found throughout the Yucatán and Belize.

It can be prepared in advance and conveniently used as a marinade or rub to flavor foods, especially meat, poultry, and seafood, that can then be grilled, baked, barbecueed, or broiled. Recado is also an ingredient for a number of popular Latin dishes.

Although often personalized, typical ingredients include annatto, oregano, cumin, clove, cinnamon, black pepper, allspice, garlic, salt, ground with liquids such as sour orange juice or vinegar into a paste. It can even be added to masa (corn dough) to create a zesty flavor and color as in empanadas, red tamales, and chorizo.

While colorado (red) is most known, other common recados include negro (black) and verde (green). Additional variants include: recado blanco, recado mechado, and recado español.

== Recado rojo (red paste) ==
Recado rojo, also called recado colorado, has a distinctive red-orange color that derives from ground annatto (achiote) seed.

It is commonly used when making tacos al pastor and pollo pibil.

== Recado negro (Black paste) ==
Recado negro is a shiny black color due to the char resulting from burnt chilies and other toasted ingredients which create a smoky flavor profile.

It is used when making dishes such as carne asada and relleno negro.
