= Red Leicester =

English hard cheese similar to Cheddar

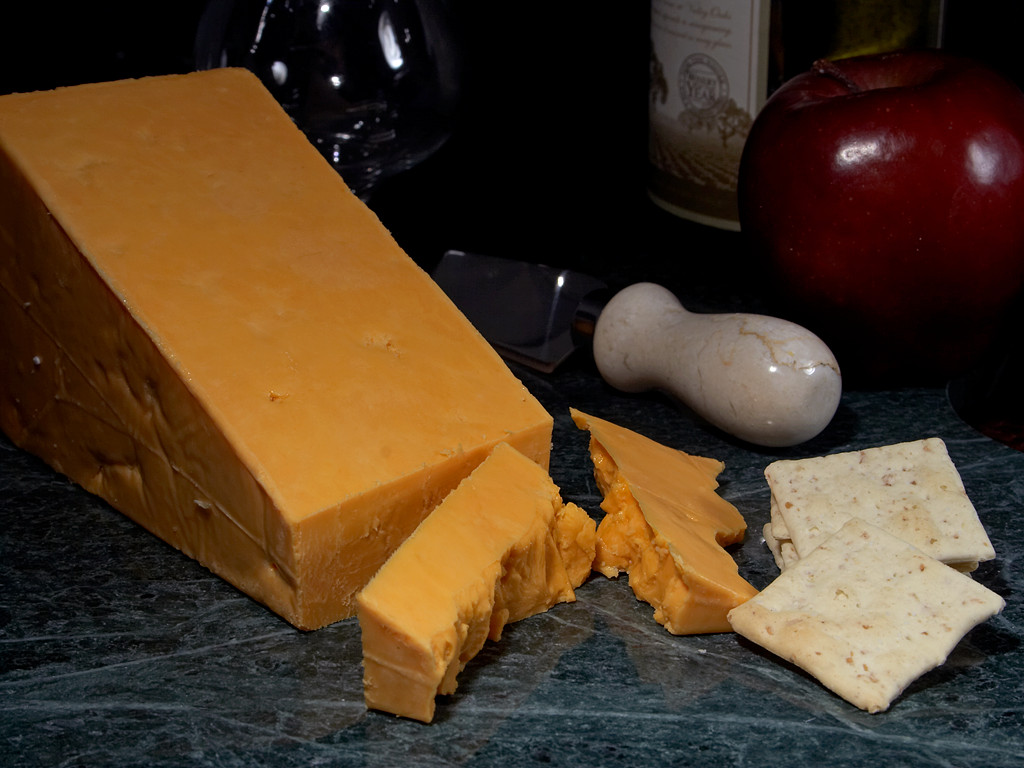
- Other names: Leicestershire, Leicester
- Country of origin: England
- Region: Leicestershire
- Source of milk: Cattle
- Pasteurised: Frequently
- Texture: Hard
- Fat content: 33% total (48% as FDM)
- Aging time: 6 to 12 months
- Named after: Leicester, Leicestershire[*]

Red Leicester (also known simply as Leicester or Leicestershire cheese) (/ˈlɛstə/, /ˈlɛstərʃə/) is an English cheese similar to Cheddar cheese, but crumbly in texture. It is typically aged 6 to 12 months. The rind is reddish-orange with a powdery mould on it. Since the 18th century, it has been coloured orange by the addition of annatto extract during manufacture. It is a cow's milk cheese, and is named after the city of Leicester, or the ceremonial county it is located in, Leicestershire.

Traditionally made wheels are fairly firm and dry, with a friable texture and a slightly sweet, mellow flavour that becomes stronger as the cheese matures. Cheeses pressed into blocks, as produced in larger creameries, are moister, and they have a slightly sweet aftertaste and a creamy texture. The cheese has a slightly nutty taste. Versions sold in supermarkets are typically coloured with annatto, although it is possible to obtain Red Leicester without it.

Red Leicester is aged any time from four to nine months. "Young Leicesters", which are at the beginning of that range, will be very mild; it is usually after six months that a Leicester begins to develop enough of a tang to be classified as "old". The modern industrial method for aging is with vacuum packing. Smaller farmhouse makers usually still use the traditional way of maturing it in cloth, for a better flavour development.

== History ==
The cheese was originally made on farms in Leicestershire, England. Once all the Stilton desired was made, the surplus milk was used to make Red Leicester. It originally was coloured with carrot or beetroot juice.

It used to be called Leicestershire Cheese but came to be called Red Leicester. This was to distinguish it from "White Leicester," which was made to a national wartime recipe in the 1940s because of rationing.

When fresh, Red Leicester cheese generally has a fat content of 33 to 34%. Regulations require that minimum fat levels be stated in terms of the "fat in dry matter" or FDM. This is because moisture levels decrease as cheese ages. FDM measures the amount of fat present in the solids, which includes protein, minerals, vitamins and salt. The minimum FDM listed for Red Leicester is generally 48%.

== Nutrition ==
A thirty gram serving of Red Leicester contains approximately 120 calories (501 KJ of food energy). It contains around 7–8 grams of protein with a total fat of 10g, with saturated fat being ~ 6–7 grams.

== Production ==
Red Leicester is a British made cheese that comes from the town of Leicester. This cheese is made in a process of six steps, acidification, coagulation, cutting, cheddaring, pressing and aging. The cheese is mainly produced in the United Kingdom. The colour comes from adding annatto, a natural vegetable dye.

It takes roughly 3–14 months to make a full wheel of Red Leicester Cheese.
