= Flopropione =

Spasmolytic or antispasmodic agent

Clinical data
- AHFS/Drugs.com: International Drug Names
- Routes of administration: Oral
- ATC code: None

Identifiers
- IUPAC name: 1-(2,4,6-trihydroxyphenyl)propane-1-one
- CAS Number: 2295-58-1
- PubChem CID: 3362
- DrugBank: DB19489
- ChemSpider: 3245
- UNII: 05V5NVB5Y1
- KEGG: D01259
- ChEMBL: ChEMBL1605835
- CompTox Dashboard (EPA): DTXSID3045851
- ECHA InfoCard: 100.017.221

Chemical and physical data
- Formula: C_{9}H_{10}O_{4}
- Molar mass: 182.175 g·mol^{−1}
- 3D model (JSmol): Interactive image
- SMILES: CCC(=O)C1=C(C=C(C=C1O)O)O
- InChI: InChI=1S/C9H10O4/c1-2-6(11)9-7(12)3-5(10)4-8(9)13/h3-4,10,12-13H,2H2,1H3; Key:PTHLEKANMPKYDB-UHFFFAOYSA-N

Flopropione (Compacsul, Cospanon, Ecapron, Pellegal, Argobyl, Floveton, Saritron, Spamorin, Labrodax, Tryalon, Mirulevatin, Padeskin, Profenon) is a spasmolytic or antispasmodic agent. It acts as a COMT inhibitor. The drug has also been said to be a serotonin 5-HT_{1A} receptor antagonist. It is synthesized from phloroglucinol in a Hoesch reaction.

== See also ==
- 2,4,6-Trihydroxyacetophenone (THAP)
