= Quinolacetic acid =

Names
- Preferred IUPAC name (1-Hydroxy-4-oxocyclohexa-2,5-dien-1-yl)acetic acid

Identifiers
CAS Number	55604-87-0
3D model (JSmol)	Interactive image
ChemSpider	4955602
PubChem CID	6453213
UNII	5QED2ML5KK
CompTox Dashboard (EPA)	DTXSID90204151
- InChI: InChI=1S/C8H8O4/c9-6-1-3-8(12,4-2-6)5-7(10)11/h1-4,12H,5H2,(H,10,11) Key: RFJUCKOEXRTZPN-UHFFFAOYSA-N; InChI=1/C8H8O4/c9-6-1-3-8(12,4-2-6)5-7(10)11/h1-4,12H,5H2,(H,10,11) Key: RFJUCKOEXRTZPN-UHFFFAOYAA
- SMILES: O=C\1\C=C/C(O)(/C=C/1)CC(=O)O

Properties
Chemical formula	C_{8}H_{8}O_{4}
Molar mass	168.148 g·mol^{−1}
- Except where otherwise noted, data are given for materials in their standard state (at 25 °C [77 °F], 100 kPa). Infobox references

Quinolacetic acid is a chemical compound associated with the metabolic disorder hawkinsinuria. It is the byproduct of a partially defective enzyme, 4-hydroxyphenylpyruvate dioxygenase.
