= Bixin =

- Skeletal formula

Names
- IUPAC name (2E,4E,6E,8E,10E,12E,14E,16Z,18E)-20-Methoxy-4,8,13,17-tetramethyl-20-oxoicosa-2,4,6,8,10,12,14,16,18-nonaenoic acid
- Other names cis-Bixin; α-Bixin; 9-cis-6,6'-Diapo-ψ,ψ-carotenedioic acid, 6-methyl ester

Identifiers
CAS Number	6983-79-5; 39937-23-0 (trans)
3D model (JSmol)	Interactive image
ChEBI	CHEBI:3136
ChEMBL	ChEMBL1172615
ChemSpider	4444638
ECHA InfoCard	100.027.499
PubChem CID	5281226
UNII	9L7T4VB66G; 6JH6LEZ7HY (trans)
CompTox Dashboard (EPA)	DTXSID1024629
- InChI: InChI=1S/C25H30O4/c1-20(12-8-14-22(3)16-18-24(26)27)10-6-7-11-21(2)13-9-15-23(4)17-19-25(28)29-5/h6-19H,1-5H3,(H,26,27)/b7-6+,12-8+,13-9+,18-16+,19-17+,20-10+,21-11+,22-14+,23-15+ Key: RAFGELQLHMBRHD-IFNPSABLSA-N; InChI=1/C25H30O4/c1-20(12-8-14-22(3)16-18-24(26)27)10-6-7-11-21(2)13-9-15-23(4)17-19-25(28)29-5/h6-19H,1-5H3,(H,26,27)/b7-6+,12-8+,13-9+,18-16+,19-17+,20-10+,21-11+,22-14+,23-15- Key: RAFGELQLHMBRHD-SLEZCNMEBU
- SMILES: O=C(O)\C=C\C(=C\C=C\C(=C\C=C\C=C(\C=C\C=C(/C=C/C(=O)OC)C)C)C)C

Properties
Chemical formula	C_{25}H_{30}O_{4}
Molar mass	394.511 g·mol^{−1}
Appearance	Orange crystals
Melting point	198 °C (cis-isomer); 217 °C (trans-isomer)
Solubility in water	Insoluble

Hazards
NFPA 704 (fire diamond)	1 1 0
- Except where otherwise noted, data are given for materials in their standard state (at 25 °C [77 °F], 100 kPa). verify (what is ?) Infobox references

Bixin is an apocarotenoid found in the seeds of the achiote tree (Bixa orellana) from which it derives its name. It is commonly extracted from the seeds to form annatto, a natural food coloring, containing about 5% pigments, of which 70–80% are bixin.

== Applications ==
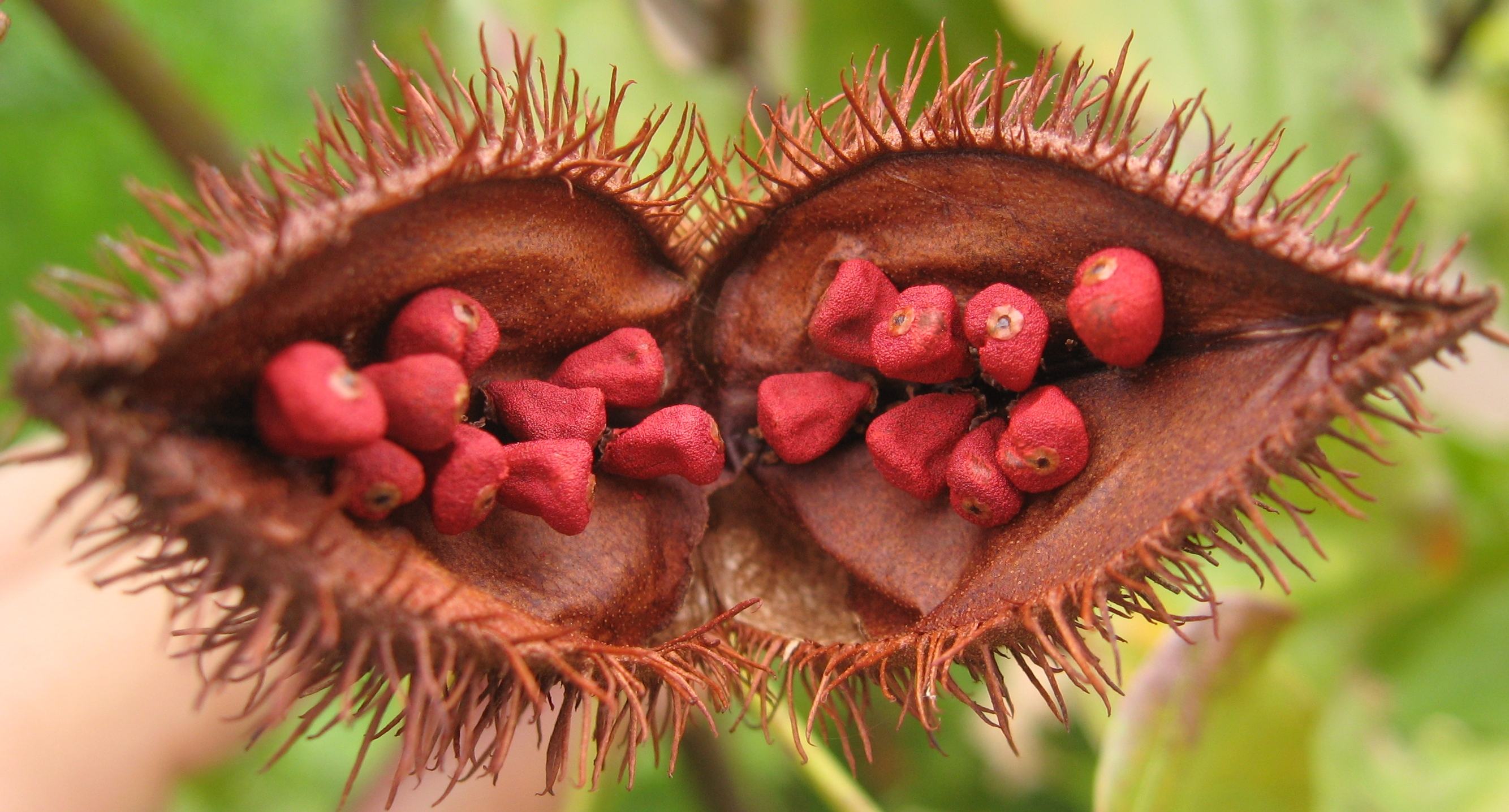
Red seeds of the achiote tree

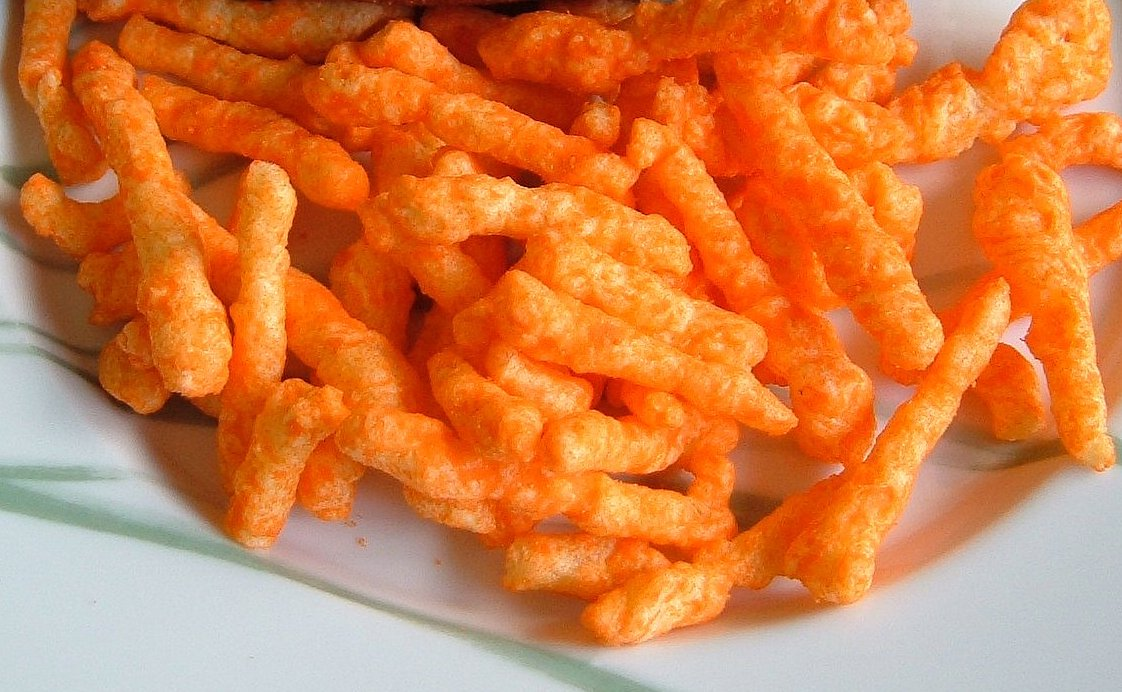
Bixin is one of the colorants used in the snack Cheetos.

Several thousand tons are harvested annually.

== Chemical properties ==
Bixin is unstable. It isomerizes into trans-bixin (β-bixin), the double-bond isomer.

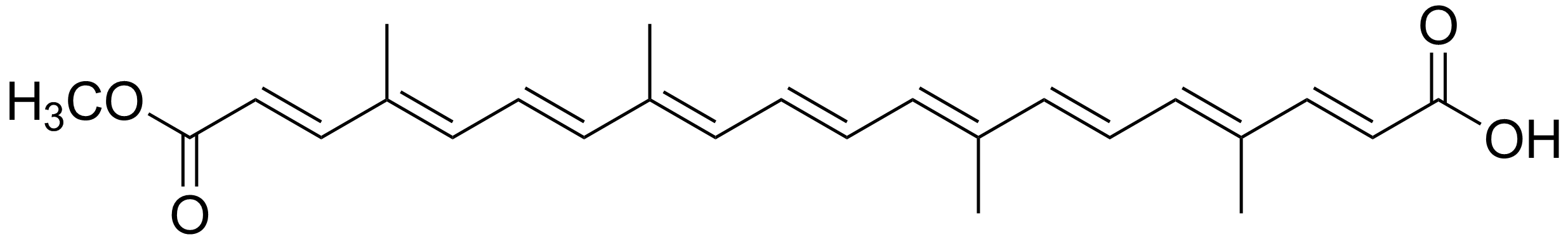
Chemical structure of trans-bixin

Bixin is soluble in fats and alcohols but insoluble in water. Upon exposure to alkali, the methyl ester is hydrolyzed to produce the dicarboxylic acid norbixin, a water-soluble derivative.

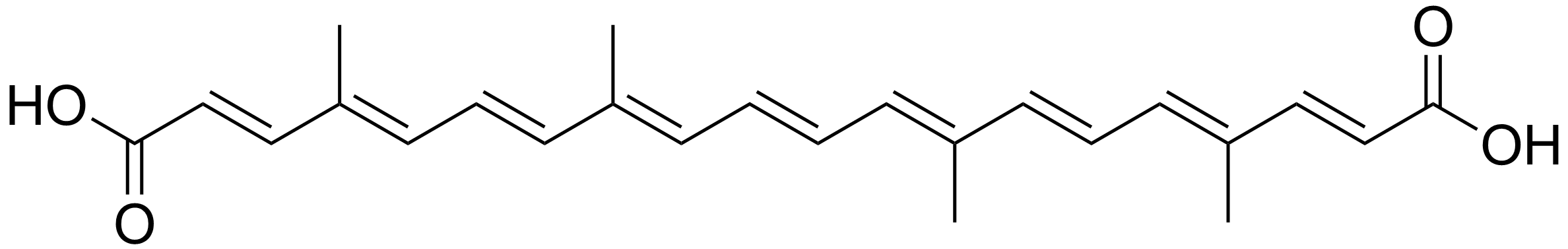
Chemical structure of norbixin
