= Gallacetophenone =

Names
- Preferred IUPAC name 1-(2,3,4-Trihydroxyphenyl)ethan-1-one
- Other names 1-(2,3,4-Trihydroxyphenyl)ethanone; Alizarin Yellow C Galloacetophenone; 2',3',4'-Trihydroxyacetophenone

Identifiers
CAS Number	528-21-2
3D model (JSmol)	Interactive image
ChemSpider	10256
ECHA InfoCard	100.007.665
PubChem CID	10706
UNII	C70E921C4P
CompTox Dashboard (EPA)	DTXSID2060179
- InChI: InChI=1S/C8H8O4/c1-4(9)5-2-3-6(10)8(12)7(5)11/h2-3,10-12H,1H3 Key: XIROXSOOOAZHLL-UHFFFAOYSA-N; InChI=1/C8H8O4/c1-4(9)5-2-3-6(10)8(12)7(5)11/h2-3,10-12H,1H3 Key: XIROXSOOOAZHLL-UHFFFAOYAA
- SMILES: O=C(c1c(O)c(O)c(O)cc1)C

Properties
Chemical formula	C_{8}H_{8}O_{4}
Molar mass	168.148 g·mol^{−1}
Melting point	171 to 172 °C (340 to 342 °F; 444 to 445 K)
- Except where otherwise noted, data are given for materials in their standard state (at 25 °C [77 °F], 100 kPa). verify (what is ?) Infobox references

Gallacetophenone is the acetyl derivative of pyrogallol. It can be synthesized from pyrogallol using zinc chloride and acetic anhydride.
