= 2,4,6-Trihydroxyacetophenone =

- Skeletal formula

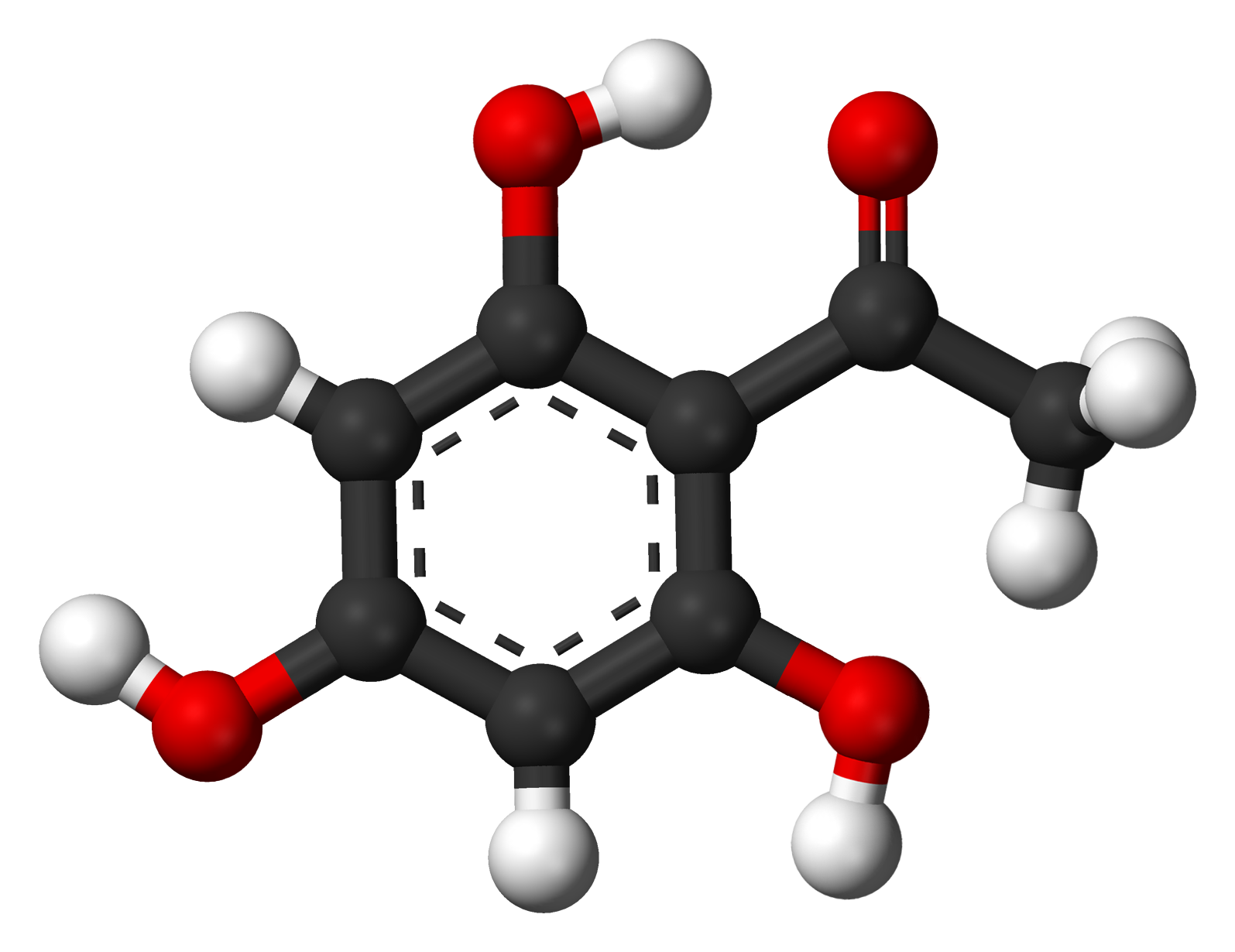
- Ball-and-stick model

Names
- Preferred IUPAC name 1-(2,4,6-Trihydroxyphenyl)ethan-1-one
- Other names 1-(2,4,6-Trihydroxyphenyl)ethanone; 2-Acetylphloroglucinol; THAP; Phloroacetophenone

Identifiers
CAS Number	480-66-0
3D model (JSmol)	Interactive image; Interactive image
ChEBI	CHEBI:64344
ChEMBL	ChEMBL452477
ChemSpider	61386
ECHA InfoCard	100.006.870
EC Number	207-556-5
KEGG	C21895
PubChem CID	68073
UNII	8L7XD8830T
CompTox Dashboard (EPA)	DTXSID5060061
- InChI: InChI=1S/C8H8O4/c1-4(9)8-6(11)2-5(10)3-7(8)12/h2-3,10-12H,1H3 Key: XLEYFDVVXLMULC-UHFFFAOYSA-N; InChI=1/C8H8O4/c1-4(9)8-6(11)2-5(10)3-7(8)12/h2-3,10-12H,1H3 Key: XLEYFDVVXLMULC-UHFFFAOYAA
- SMILES: CC(=O)c1c(cc(cc1O)O)O; O=C(c1c(O)cc(O)cc1O)C

Properties
Chemical formula	C_{8}H_{8}O_{4}
Molar mass	168.148 g·mol^{−1}
Melting point	219 to 221 °C (426 to 430 °F; 492 to 494 K)

Hazards
- GHS labelling
Pictograms	(GHS07: Exclamation mark)
Signal word	Warning
Hazard statements	H315, H319, H335
Precautionary statements	P261, P264, P271, P280, P302+P352, P304+P340, P305+P351+P338, P312, P321, P332+P313, P337+P313, P362, P403+P233, P405, P501
- Except where otherwise noted, data are given for materials in their standard state (at 25 °C [77 °F], 100 kPa). verify (what is ?) Infobox references

2,4,6-Trihydroxyacetophenone (THAP) is a chemical compound that is a derivative of phloroglucinol.

In an animal model, THAP was reported to enhance cholesterol 7 alpha-hydroxylase (CYP7A1) activity.

THAP is also used as a matrix in matrix-assisted laser desorption/ionization (MALDI) for the analysis of acidic glycans and glycopeptides in negative ion mode.

== Derivatives ==
THAP is a chemical precursor that can be used to form part of the backbone of 5,7-dihydroxyflavones like noreugenin, apigenin, luteolin, diosmetin, naringenin, and hesperetin.

== See also ==
- Flopropione
