= Derek Russell Davis =

Derek Russell Davis (20 April 1914 – 3 February 1993) was a British psychiatrist who served as the Norah Cooke-Hurle Professor of Mental Health at Bristol University from 1962 to 1979. His wife's name is Marit, his son's name is Jan and his daughter's name is Vivien.

== Career ==
Davis attended the Stowe School before obtaining a medical degree at the School of Clinical Medicine of the University of Cambridge. He completed his residency at Middlesex Hospital, and returned to Cambridge to work at the university hospital. Davis was named reader of clinical psychology in 1950, and when he was appointed as director of the Medical Psychology Laboratory, he began teaching medical psychology in 1958. He left for Bristol University in 1962 and taught there until 1979, as the Norah Cooke-Hurle Professor of Mental Health. Davis wrote for the British Journal of Medical Psychology and was the editor of the Quarterly Journal of Experimental Psychology.
