= The New Blackmore Vale Magazine =

British local news magazine

- Type: Fortnightly news magazine
- Owner(s): The Blackmore Vale Ltd
- Editor-in-chief: Paul Jones
- Founded: September 2020
- Headquarters: Wincanton
- Circulation: 32,500 (as of 2021)
- Website: blackmorevale.net

The New Blackmore Vale Magazine is a fortnightly news magazine, published in Wincanton. Founded in 2020, following the closure of the Blackmore Vale Magazine, it had a fortnightly circulation of 32,500 as of September 2021.

The magazine is owned by The Blackmore Vale Ltd, a subsidiary of Armishaws Media, alongside its sister publications: the New Stour & Avon, the Salisbury & Avon Gazette, the Purbeck Gazette and the Somerset Leveller.

It covers the Blackmore Vale, an area of north Dorset, south Somerset and southwest Wiltshire.

== History ==
=== 1978-2020: The original Blackmore Vale Magazine ===
In 1978, Alan and Ingrid Chalcraft purchased the struggling magazine, Stalbridge News, for £2,500. They rebranded it the Blackmore Vale Magazine and 15 years later sold the publication for £1,000,000 to Trinity International. Trinity merged with the Mirror Group to become Trinity Mirror.

By 2007, the Blackmore Vale had a circulation of 54,850, according to the Guardian. It had two sister papers, the Fosse Way Magazine (28,000 circulation) and the Community Magazine (54,000 circulation). The same year, all three were sold as part of a package with 23 other regional titles to the Daily Mail and General Trust for £64.15m.

In 2012, the publisher Local World was formed and acquired a large number of regional titles, including the Blackmore Vale Magazine. Local World was sold to Trinity Mirror in 2015. In 2018, Trinity Mirror was rebranded as Reach plc.

Publication suspended in March 2020 amid the COVID-19 pandemic, and in August, Reach announced the magazine would be closed down and replaced by the online SomersetLive.

=== 2020-present: The New Blackmore Vale Magazine ===
On September 24, 2020, Wiltshire businessman Lloyd Armishaw launched the first issue of the New Blackmore Vale Magazine, with an initial print run of 30,000. It was edited by Miranda Robertson until she stepped down in 2022. Paul Jones - former group editor for the Archant south west division, and Newsquest's four Somerset papers - was appointed as editor-in-chief of The Blackmore Vale Ltd in October 2022.
