= Church of St Peter and St Paul, Shepton Mallet =

Church in Somerset, England

Church of St Peter and St Paul
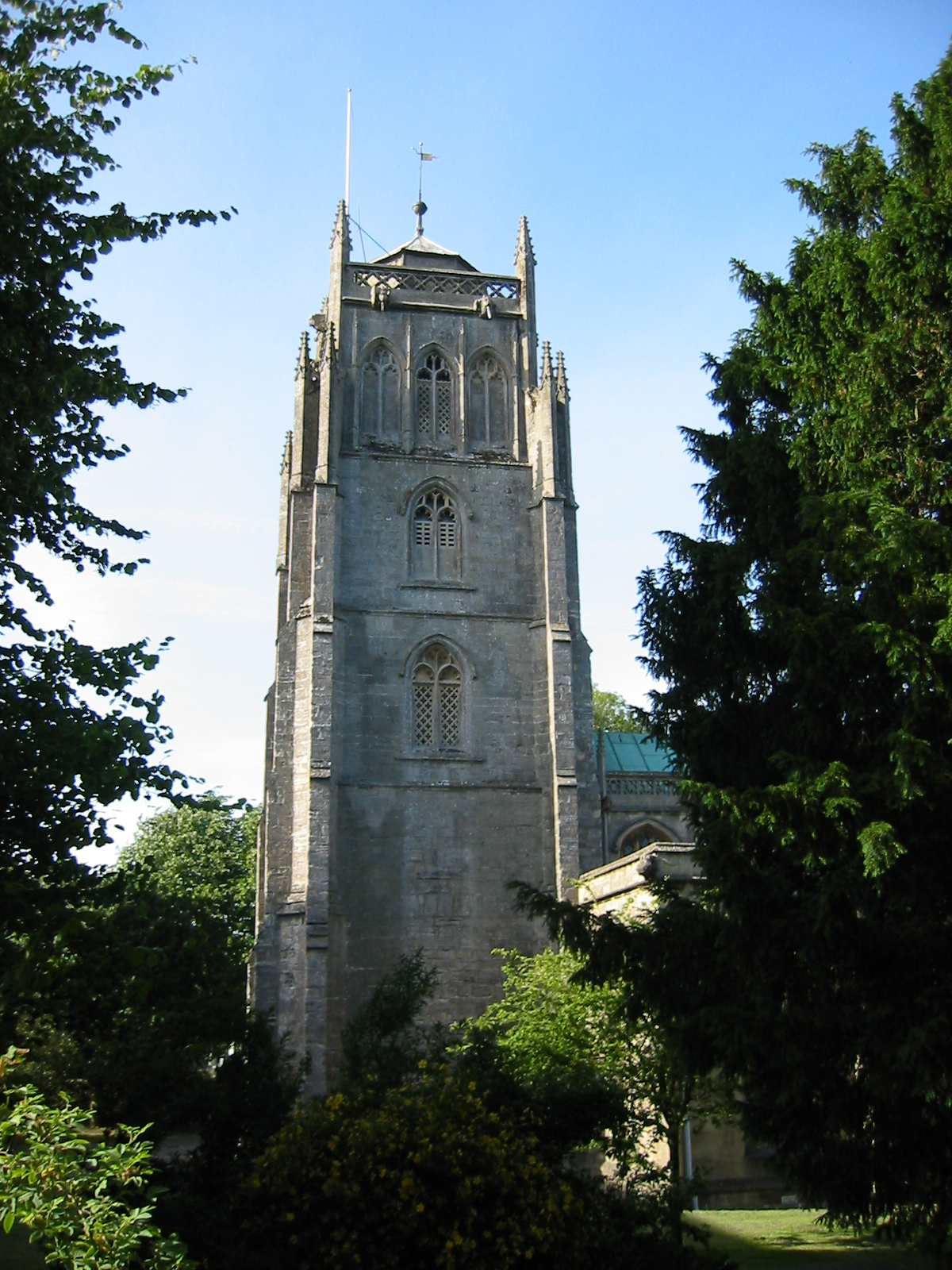

- Location within Somerset

General information
- Location: Shepton Mallet, England
- Coordinates: 51.1910°N 2.5457°W
- Completed: 15th century

The Church of St Peter and St Paul in Shepton Mallet, Somerset, England, dates from the 12th century and has been designated as a Grade I listed building.

There is evidence of a church on the site from before the Norman Conquest of 1066, and the font may date from that time. The only other remains are the walls around the chancel arch.

The current building is largely from the 15th century, with further rebuilding in 1836 to 1837 when the original chapels, aisles and transepts were demolished in order to enlarge them. The timber roof includes 350 panels of different designs and 36 carved angels along the sides, which was described by Nikolaus Pevsner as "the finest 15th-century carved oak wagon-roof in England". The stone pulpit dates from around 1550 and has six carved panels.

The four stage tower was built around 1423, with four pinnacles, a lozenge parapet, triple window arrangement and stair turret. It was originally intended to have a spire but this was never built.

The Millennium Window (2000 AD) was designed, constructed and installed by local stained glass artist John Yeo.

== See also ==
- List of Grade I listed buildings in Mendip
- List of towers in Somerset
- List of ecclesiastical parishes in the Diocese of Bath and Wells
