= William Henry Coombes =

William Henry Coombes (8 May 1767 – 15 November 1850) was an English Roman Catholic priest, theologian and writer.

== Life ==
He passed his early years at Meadgate, Somerset, England, the property and for many years the residence of his uncle, William Coombes (d. 18 April 1822), of Douai College, Grand-Vicar of the Western District. Young Coombes went to Douai at the age of twelve, was ordained in 1791, and during the French Revolution escaped (October, 1793) from Dourlens to England.

He was a doctor of theology and co-operated with Bishop Douglass at Old Hall seminary as professor and vice-president. From 1810 he served the mission of Shepton Mallet till 1849, when he retired to Downside monastery, where he died.

== Works ==
His chief works are:

- "Sacred Eloquence; being Discourses from the Writings of Sts. Basil and Chrysostom, with the Letters of St. Eucherius of Lyons" (London, 1798);
- "Escape from France; with an account of the English Poor Clares from Aire, and a narrative of the sufferings and death of Pius VI" (London, 1799);
- "Life of St. Francis de Sales, from the French of Marsollier" (Shepton Mallet, 1812);
- "Spiritual Entertainments of St. Francis de Sales" (Taunton, 1814);
- "The Essence of Religious Controversy" (1827);
- "Life of St. Jane Frances de Chantal" (London, 1830).

There are other writings by Coombes on religious and political themes.
