= Shepton Mallet =

Town in Somerset, England

Coordinates: 51.193°N 2.546°W

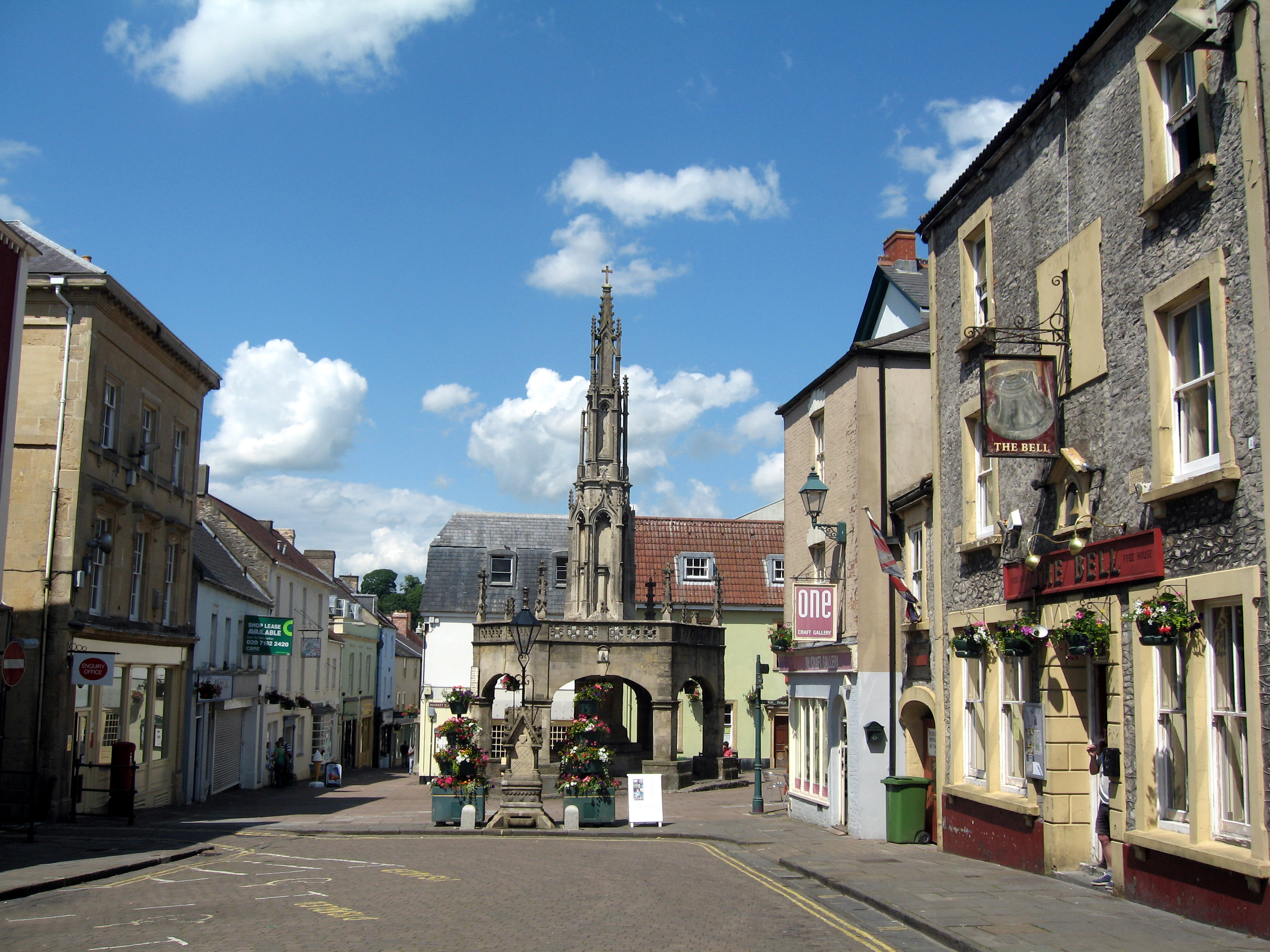
- The historic marketplace, with the Market Cross

- Location within Somerset
- Population: 10,592 (Parish, 2021); 9,645 (Built-up area, 2021)
- OS grid reference: ST619438
  - London: 106 mi (171 km) E
- Unitary authority: Somerset Council
- Ceremonial county: Somerset
- Region: South West
- Country: England
- Sovereign state: United Kingdom
- Post town: SHEPTON MALLET
- Postcode district: BA4
- Dialling code: 01749
- Police: Avon and Somerset
- Fire: Devon and Somerset
- Ambulance: South Western
- UK Parliament: Wells and Mendip Hills

Shepton Mallet is a market town and civil parish in Somerset, England. It lies 16 miles (26 km) south-west of Bath, 18 miles (29 km) south of Bristol and 5 miles (8 km) east of Wells. At the 2021 census, the parish had a population of 10,592 and the built-up area had a population of 9,645.

The Mendip Hills lie to the north and the River Sheppey runs through the town, as does the route of the Fosse Way, the main Roman road between north-east and south-west England. There is evidence of Roman settlement. Its listed buildings include a medieval parish church. Shepton Mallet Prison closed in March 2013; immediately before its closure it had been England's oldest prison still in use. The medieval wool trade gave way to trades such as brewing in the 18th century. It remains noted for cider production. It is the closest town to the Glastonbury Festival and nearby the Royal Bath and West of England Society showground.

== History ==
=== Toponymy ===
The name Shepton derives from the Old English scoep and tun, meaning "sheep farm"; the Domesday Book of 1086 records a settlement known as Sceaptun in the hundred of Whitstone. The current spelling is recorded at least as far back as 1496, in a letter from Henry VII. The second part of the name derives from that of the Norman family of Malet. Gilbert Malet, son of William Malet, Honour of Eye, held a lease from Glastonbury Abbey around 1100. The second letter "l" appears to have been added to the spelling in the 16th century.

=== Prehistoric settlement ===
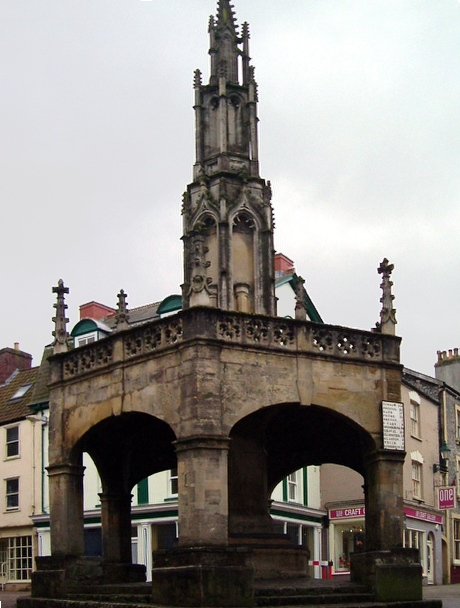
The Market Cross

Archaeological investigations have found evidence of prehistoric activity in the Shepton Mallet area, with large amounts of Neolithic flint and some pottery fragments of the late Neolithic period. Two barrows on Barren Down, to the north of the town centre, contained cremation burials from the Bronze Age; another Bronze Age burial site contained a skeleton and some pottery. The remains of Iron Age roundhouses and artefacts such as quernstones and beads were found at Cannard's Grave, as was a probable Iron Age farming settlement at Field Farm. Nearby countryside provides evidence of Iron Age cave dwellings in Ham Woods to the north-west, and several burial mounds at Beacon Hill, a short distance to the north.

=== Roman occupation ===
Shepton Mallet is about halfway between the Roman towns of Bath and Ilchester on the Fosse Way. Although there are no visible remains apart from the line of the Roman road, there is archaeological evidence for early military and later civilian settlement lasting into the 5th century. Domed pottery kilns, with pottery still present, were identified on the site of the Anglo-Bavarian Brewery in the mid-19th century, suggesting military activity in the 1st and 2nd centuries. Several hoards of Roman coins ranging from the 1st to 4th centuries have been found and more than 300 fibula brooches, potsherds and other artefacts. A few isolated burials near the Fosse Way were found in the 19th century.

A lead coffin in a rock-cut grave was discovered at a site by the Fosse Way in 1988. This discovery and impending commercial development of the site by the landowner, Showerings, led archaeologists to excavate more extensively in the 1990s. The grave belonged to a cemetery containing 17 burials aligned roughly east and west, indicating probable Christian beliefs. Two smaller cemeteries had graves aligned north–south, possibly signifying pagan religious practices. One burial was in a substantial stone coffin positioned beneath a mausoleum, whose foundations remained.

One find in the Fosse Way burials was a Chi-Rho amulet, thought then to be from the 5th century and considered among the earliest clear evidence of Christianity in England. A copy was presented to the Archbishop of Canterbury, George Carey, by the churches of the Diocese of Bath and Wells. The amulet is in the Museum of Somerset, but analysis by Liverpool University in 2008 using inductively coupled plasma atomic emission spectroscopy showed it was a fake: its silver content dates from the 19th century or later.

Excavations in the 1990s confirmed the presence of a linear settlement along the Fosse Way for perhaps a kilometre, with cobbled streets, wooden and stone workshops and houses (some with two storeys) containing hearths and ovens, workshop areas and a stone-lined well. The many artefacts found included local and imported pottery such as Samian ware, items of jewellery such as brooches, rings and bracelets, toilet items including tweezers, ear scoops and nail cleaners, bronze and iron tools, and a lead ingot which probably originated from the Roman lead mines in the Mendip Hills. Coins minted across the Roman Empire were also found. The finds indicate occupation from the late 1st or early 2nd centuries to the late 4th or early 5th centuries. As no public buildings were found, the settlement was probably not a town.

=== Saxon and Norman periods ===
Evidence of Saxon settlement includes some Saxon stonework in the parish church of St Peter and St Paul. A charter of King Ine of Wessex, from 706, witnessed by nine bishops including the Archbishop of Canterbury, records that the area where Shepton Mallet now stands was passed to Abbot Berwald of Glastonbury Abbey. According to some legends Indract of Glastonbury was buried in Shepton. The town was in the Whitstone Hundred; the hundred courts were held at Cannard's Grave, just south of the town.

The Exeter Domesday Book records that on the death of Edward the Confessor in 1066, the site was held (probably by lease from the Abbey) by one Uluert, and then by Roger de Corcella at the time of the Domesday survey in 1086. When Corcella died, sometime before or around 1100, the land passed to the Malets, a Norman family whose name was added to that of the settlement (and another of their holdings, Curi – now Curry Mallet).

=== Middle Ages ===
The Malets retained the estate until the reign of King John, when on the death of William Malet (fl. 1192–1215) and the payment by his sons-in-law of a fine of 2000 marks for participating in a rebellion against the king) it passed through his daughter Mabel to her husband Hugh de Vivonne. Some generations later, the part of the estate containing Shepton Mallet was sold to a relative, Sir Thomas Gournay. His son, also Thomas, took part in the murder of Edward II. His estates were confiscated by Edward III in 1337, but returned some years later. When Mathew de Gournay died childless in 1406, the estate reverted to the Crown and was then granted to Sir John de Tiptoft. It was again confiscated from his son by Henry VI during the Wars of the Roses, when the family sided with Edward IV, but restored to Sir John's grandson, Edward Tiptoft, when Edward IV regained the throne. He died without issue, and there followed a succession of grants and reversions until Glastonbury Abbey was dissolved by Henry VIII, and its lands, including Shepton Mallet, were granted to the Duchy of Cornwall in 1536.

Charters for markets and fairs were granted in 1235, but revoked in 1260 and 1318 after objections by the Bishop of Wells to the competition it represented to the market in his city. This shows that the town was developing and prospering in the 13th and early 14th centuries. The Black Death struck in 1348, reducing the population to about 300. In the late 14th and early 15th centuries, the population and economy were boosted by craftsmen and merchants arriving from France and the Low Countries, who were escaping wars and religious persecution. They introduced cloth-making, which together with the local wool trade, became a major industry in Shepton and other Somerset and Wiltshire towns. Wool became such a source of riches that when Henry VII needed money to fight the Scots in 1496, he called on the wool merchants of Shepton to contribute £10.

To our trusty and wellbeloved John Calycote of Shepton Malet...
...because as we here ye be a man of good substaunce—we desire and pray you to makelone vnto us of the som of ten poundes whereof ye shal be vndoubtedly and assuredly repayd in our Receipt at the fest of Seynt Andrewe next coming...

— Henry VII, Letter under King's sign manual and Privy Seal, 1 December 1496

=== Stuart era ===
In the English Civil War, the town supported the Parliament side, although Shepton appears largely to have escaped conflict apart from a bloodless confrontation in the market place on 1 August 1642 between Royalists under Sir Ralph Hopton and Parliament led by Colonel William Strode. In 1645 Sir Thomas Fairfax led the New Model Army through the town on the way to capturing Bristol, and in 1646 the church organ was apparently destroyed by Cromwellian soldiers.

In 1675, a House of Correction was set up in Shepton Mallet.

During the Monmouth Rebellion of 1685, the Duke of Monmouth was welcomed when he passed through Shepton Mallet to stay at Longbridge House in Cowl Street on the night of 23 June, with his men quartered around the town, before setting out for Bristol next day. Many Shepton men joined the cause, but Monmouth failed to take Bath or Bristol and had to return to Shepton on 30 June. After the Battle of Sedgemoor, the Duke fled, spent the night of 6 July at Downside, a mile north of Shepton, and was captured two days later. After the Bloody Assizes, twelve local supporters of Monmouth were hanged and quartered in the market place.

In 1699 Edward Strode built almshouses, close to the rectory that his family had built, to house the town's grammar school, which lasted until 1900.

=== 18th–20th centuries ===
In the 17th and 18th centuries thriving wool and cloth industries were powered by the waters of the River Sheppey. There were said to be 50 mills in and around the town in the early 18th century, and a number of fine clothiers' houses survive, particularly in Bowlish, a hamlet on the western edge of Shepton Mallet. Although these industries still employed some 4,000 towards the end of the century, they were beginning to decline. Discontent at mechanisation of the mills resulted in the deaths of two men in a riot in the town in 1775. This apparently discouraged mill-owners from modernising further. The decision resulted in Shepton's cloth trade losing out to the steam-powered mills in the north of England in the early 19th century. The manufacture of silk and crepe revived the town's fortunes somewhat, and Shepton's mills made the silk used in Queen Victoria's wedding dress. However, these industries also died out eventually.

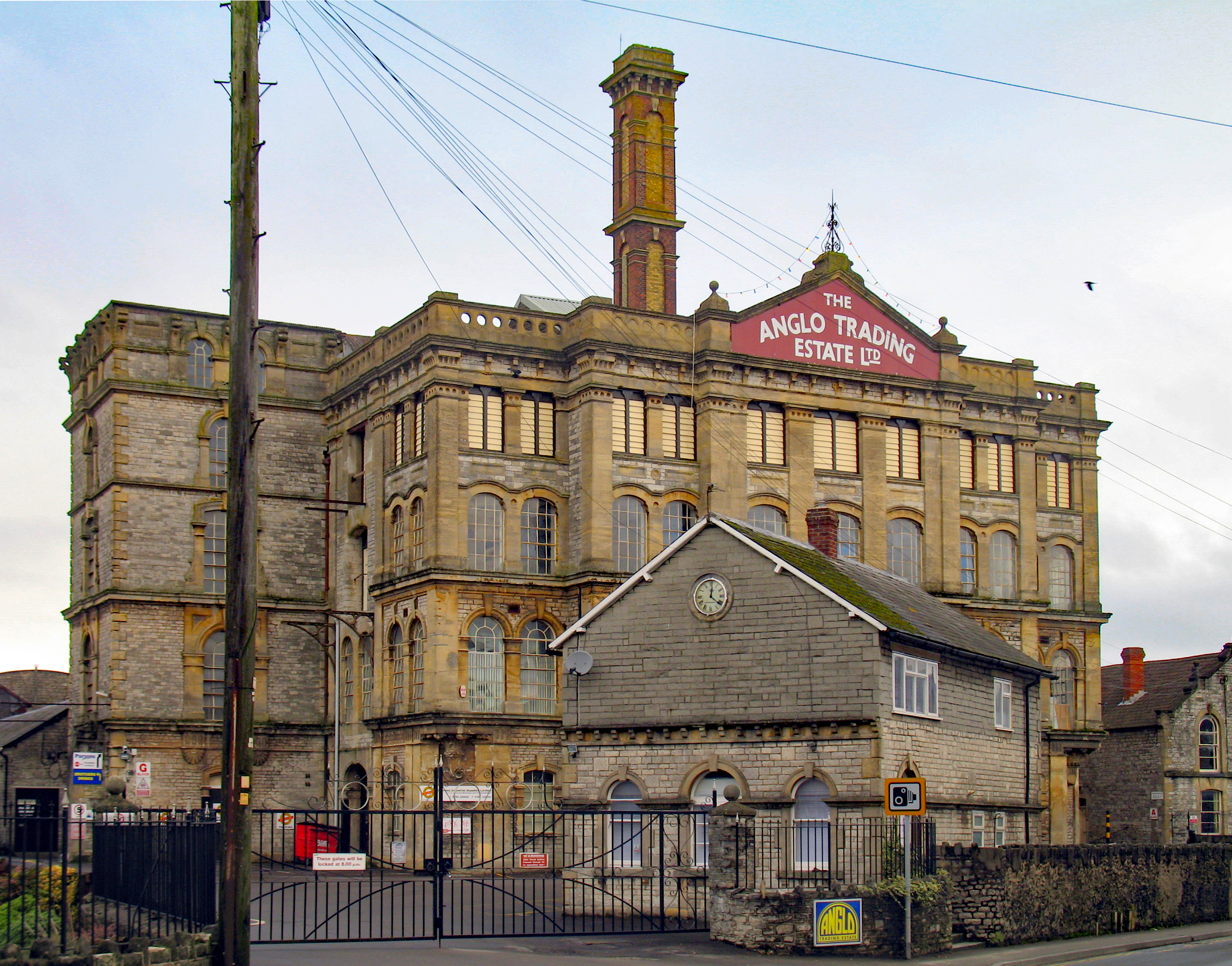
The former Anglo-Bavarian Brewery

While wool, cloth and silk declined, other industries grew. In the 19th and 20th centuries brewing became one of the major industries. The Anglo-Bavarian Brewery, built in 1864 and still a local landmark, was the first in England to brew lager. At its height, it was exporting 1.8 million bottles a year to Australia, New Zealand, India, South Africa, South America and the West Indies. It closed in 1921. However the town, home of Babycham, is still a centre for cider production.

For some of the Second World War, Shepton Mallet Prison was used to store national records from the Public Record Office, including the Magna Carta, the Domesday Book, the logbooks of HMS Victory, dispatches from the Battle of Waterloo and the "scrap of paper" signed by Hitler and British prime minister Neville Chamberlain at the Munich Conference of September 1938. The prison also became a US Army detention facility. Between 1943 and 1945, 18 US servicemen were executed within the prison walls, after convictions for murder, rape or both.

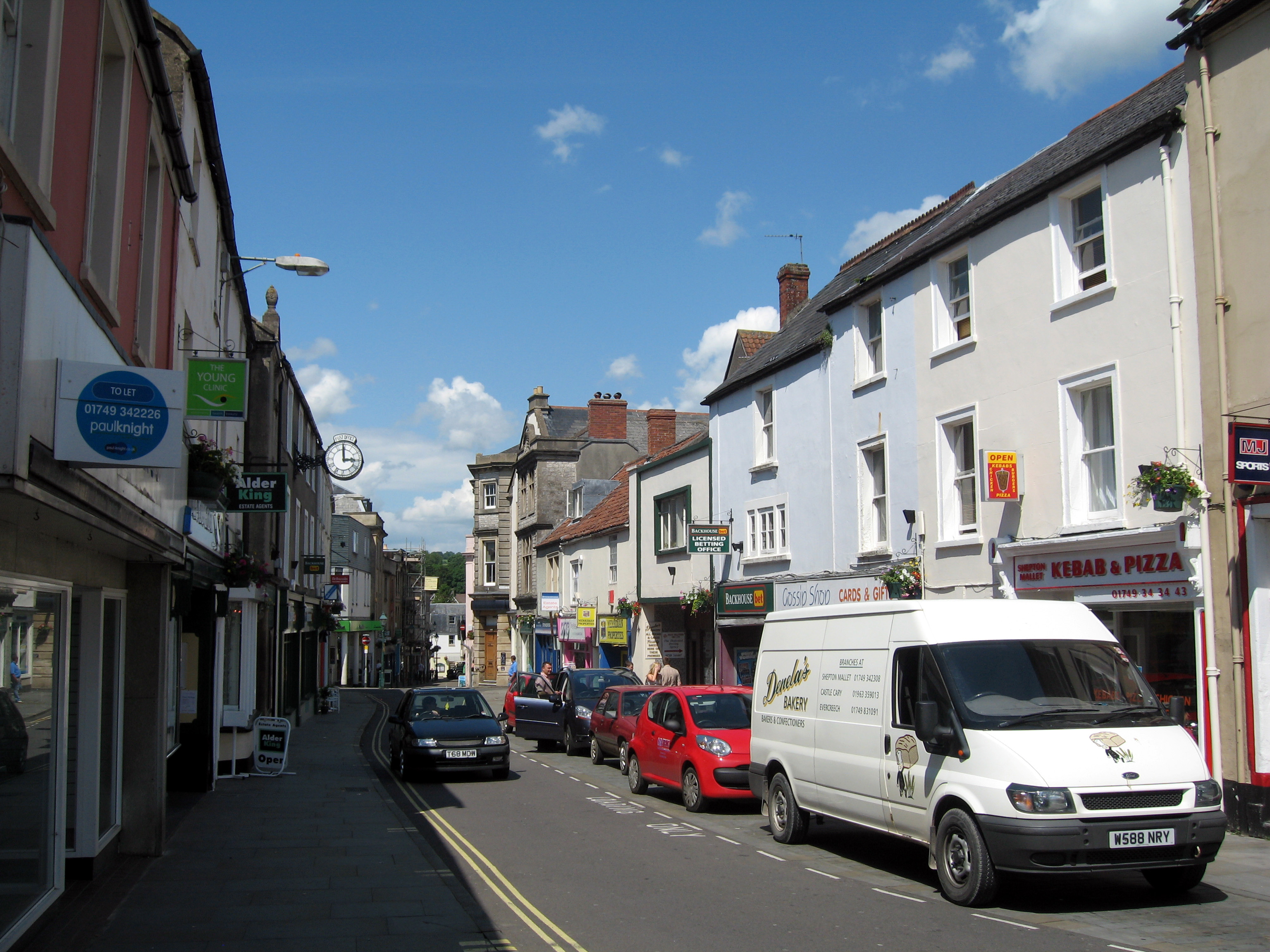
The High Street shops

In the 1960s and 1970s many historic buildings were demolished to build Hillmead council estate in the north of the town and a retail development and theatre in the market place.

The population of Shepton Mallet was fairly stable through the 19th century and the first part of the 20th: 5,104 in 1801 and 5,117 in 1851, then 5,446 by 1901, falling back to 5,260 in 1951. By 2001, it had grown again to 8,981.

== Governance ==
There are two tiers of local government covering Shepton Mallet, at parish (town) and unitary authority level: Shepton Mallet Town Council and Somerset Council. The town council is based at 1 Park Road.

For national elections, the town forms part of the Wells and Mendip Hills constituency.

=== Administrative history ===
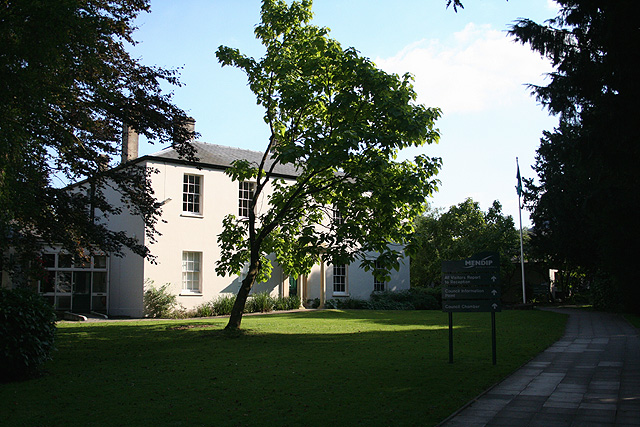
Highfield House

Shepton Mallet was an ancient parish in the Whitstone hundred of Somerset. In 1876, the parish was made a local government district, administered by an elected local board. Such districts were reconstituted as urban districts under the Local Government Act 1894.

Shepton Mallet Urban District was abolished in 1974 under the Local Government Act 1972. The area then became part of the new Mendip District. A successor parish called Shepton Mallet covering the former urban district was created as part of the 1974 reforms, with its parish council taking the name Shepton Mallet Town Council.

Mendip District Council was initially based at various offices across the district inherited from its predecessors, including Highfield House on Park Road in Shepton Mallet. It had been built as a house around 1800, and prior to 1974 had been the offices for Shepton Mallet Rural District Council which had administered the rural parishes surrounding the town. A new centralised office for Mendip District Council was completed in 1987 in the grounds of Highfield House.

Mendip district was abolished in 2023. Somerset County Council then took over district-level functions across its area, making it a unitary authority, and was renamed Somerset Council.

== Services ==
There are two medical surgeries in Shepton Mallet, a National Health Service community hospital formerly operated by Somerset Primary Care Trust, and an independent sector treatment centre, which carries out certain surgical procedures. The nearest general hospital is the Royal United Hospital in Bath.

Devon and Somerset Fire and Rescue Service has retained its fire station adjacent to the ambulance station of South Western Ambulance Service NHS Trust.

Avon and Somerset Constabulary closed the town police station in 2014, but reopened it in 2020, next to the Haskins retail park. The town belongs to Somerset East policing district.

== Geography ==
Shepton Mallet lies in the southern foothills of the Mendip Hills. The area rests geologically on Forest Marble, Blue Lias and Oolitic limestone.

=== Nearby cave systems ===
To the north of the town are several caves of the Mendip Hills, including Thrupe Lane Swallet, a geological Site of Special Scientific Interest (SSSI), and the St. Dunstan's Well Catchment, a cave system with a series of spectacularly-decorated caves totalling about 4 miles (6.4 km) of mapped passage. The caves at Fairy Cave Quarry were formed mainly by the erosive action of water beneath the water-table at considerable pressure ("phreatic" development), but as the water table has fallen, many now lie well above it and the system contains a variety of cave formations (stalagmites, stalactites and calcite curtains) which in extent and preservation are among the best in Britain. Shatter Cave and Withyhill Cave are generally seen to be among the finest decorated caves in Britain in terms of sheer abundance of pure white and translucent calcite deposits. Small numbers of greater horseshoe bat (Rhinolophus ferrumequinum), lesser horseshoe bat (R. hipposideros) and Natterer's bat (Myotis nattereri) hibernate in the cave system. An area of nationally rare species-rich, unimproved calcareous grassland of the Sheep's-fescue-Meadow Oat-grass type lies in a field to the east of Stoke Lane Quarry.

=== Countryside ===
The countryside around Shepton is mostly farmed, although there are nearby areas of woodland. About 1.8 mi (2.9 km) to the north-east is Beacon Hill Wood, owned by the Woodland Trust), at the junction of the Fosse Way and a Roman road topping the Mendip Hills, which contain a number of tumuli. To the north-west of the town are Ham Woods, within which are the Windsor Hill railway tunnels and a viaduct, – remnants of the Somerset and Dorset Joint Railway. The East Mendip Way long-distance path passes round the northern edge of Shepton Mallet and through Ham Woods.

South-west of the town is the Friar's Oven SSSI, site of herb-rich calcareous grassland classified as the Upright Brome (Bromus erectus) type, and north-east is the Windsor Hill Quarry geological SSSI and the Windsor Hill Marsh biological SSSI, a marshy silted pond with adjacent damp, slightly acidic grassland of interest for its diverse flora, largely due to varied habitats present within a small area. Two species present are rare in Somerset: Flat-sedge (Blysmus compressus) and Slender Spike-rush (Eleocharis uniglumis). Other marshland plants include Purple Loosestrife, Yellow Flag (Iris pseudacorus), Hard Rush (Juncus inflexus), Soft Rush (J. effusus), Flowering Rush (Butomus umbellatus), Devil's-bit Scabious (Succisa pratensis), three species of Horsetail Equisetum and seven sedges Carex spp.

=== River Sheppey ===
The centre and older parts of Shepton Mallet are adjacent to the River Sheppey, in a valley about 115 m (377 ft) above sea level. The edges of the town lie about 45 m (148 ft) higher. The river has cut a narrow valley, and between Shepton Mallet and the village of Croscombe, to the west, it is bounded by steeply sloping fields and woodland. However, it flows through much of Shepton Mallet itself in underground culverts. It occasionally floods after heavy rain, as on 20 October 2006, and again on 29 May 2008, when the rainfall was too heavy for the culverts. Some houses round Leg Square, Lower Lane and Draycott Road were submerged to a depth of 1 metre (3 ft 3 in). A study by the Environment Agency identified that the current standard of flood protection in these parts of the town is insufficient, as it was of a 5–10-year event-standard, whereas current guidelines require protection of a 50–200-year standard. In the summer of 2010, the Agency began constructing a flood alleviation scheme at a cost of about £1.3 million.

=== Town areas ===
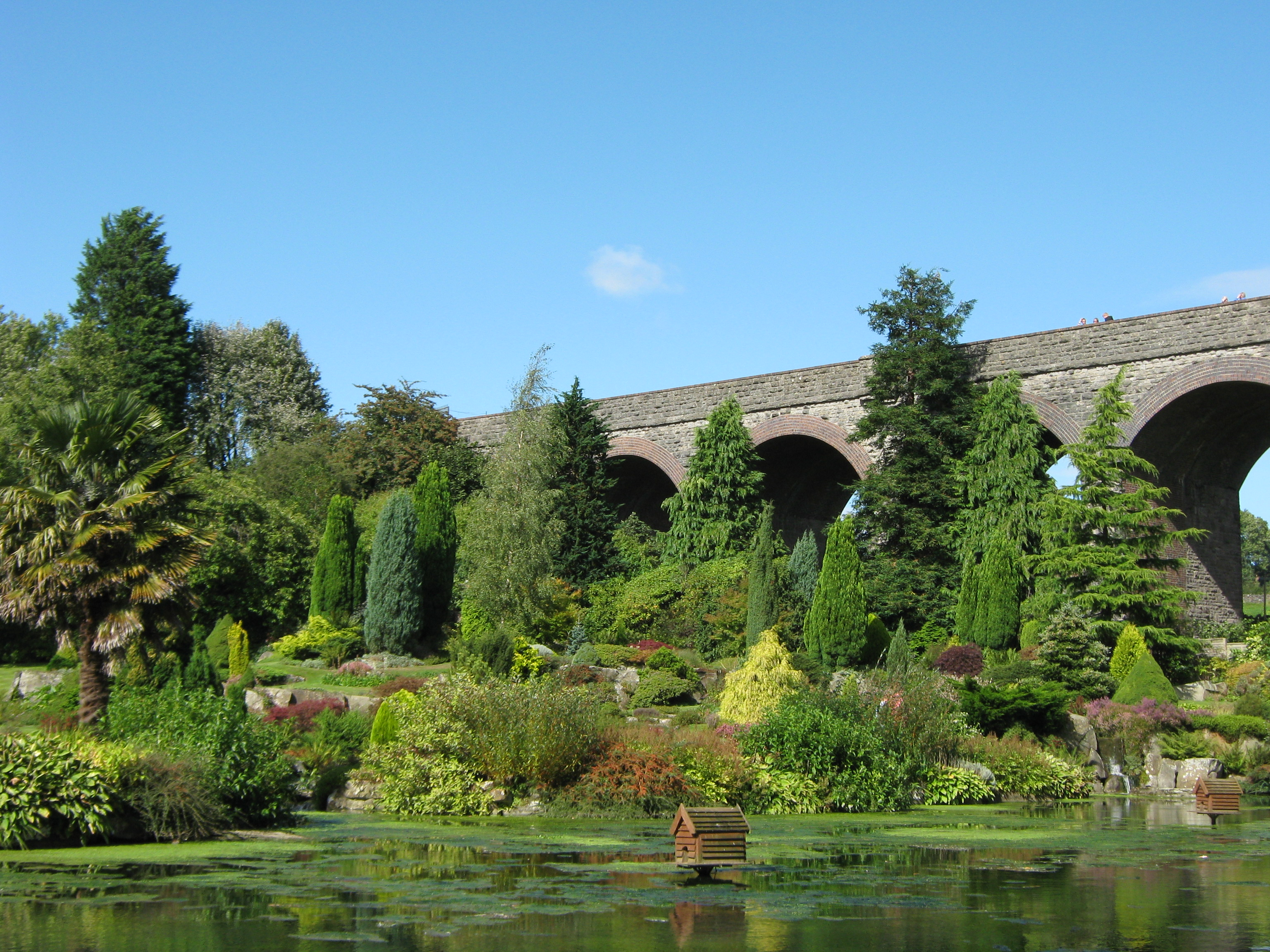
Kilver Court Gardens

Shepton Mallet has distinct areas that originated as separate communities around the central point of the church and Market Place. The town centre consists of two streets: High Street, running south from the Market Place towards the Townsend Retail Park, and the pedestrianised Town Street running north to Waterloo Bridge. To the east, separated from the Market Place by the academy complex, is the parish church of St Peter and St Paul. Lower Lane, under Waterloo Bridge along the bottom of the river valley to the north of the town centre, is one of the few parts where the River Sheppey runs above ground. At the eastern end is Leg Square, surrounded by three large houses originally built by owners of some of the town's mills. Close by is Cornhill, on which the former prison stands.

Roughly eastwards, Garston Street, also in the valley-bottom, consists of a row of weavers' and other artisans' cottages dating from the 17th century. The eastern end of the area, adjacent to Kilver Street, is now occupied by cider breweries. Across Kilver Street (the A37) is Kilver Court, which in the 20th century was a factory, headquarters of a brewing business, and then headquarters of a leather-goods manufacturer. Behind are Kilver Court Gardens, originally built by Showerings for the recreation of its staff and set against a backdrop of part of the Charlton Viaduct. These are now open to the public. On the eastern edge of the town is Charlton, which has former breweries and mills, now converted into a trading estate. Right on the edge of the town is Charlton House, a luxury hotel and spa.

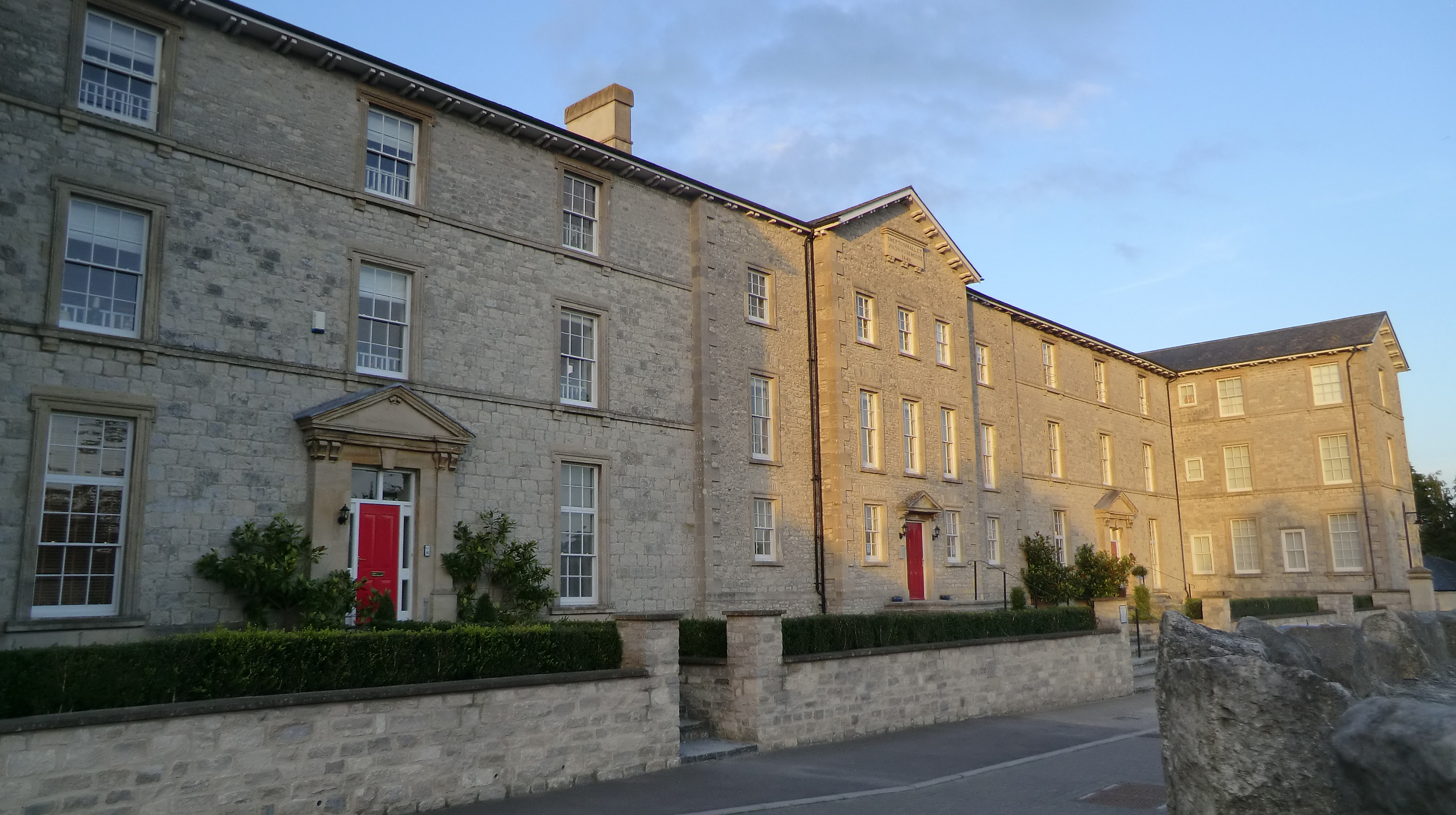
Norah Fry Hospital, formerly the Shepton Mallet Union Workhouse

On the south side of the town is a triangle of land bounded on the east by the A37, on the north by the former East Somerset Railway, and on the west by Cannard's Grave Road: Tadley Acres is a modern housing development built on land partly belonging to the Duchy of Cornwall. The development has been praised for its design quality and use of local, natural building materials. North of the former railway is Collett Park. Across Cannard's Grave Road from Tadley Acres is the Mid-Somerset Showground. Just to the south-west of the town centre, on a site which at the start of the 20th century had been the grounds of the former Summerleaze House and then a shoe factory, is the Townsend Retail Park, built in 2006–2007.

West Shepton, the south-west corner of town, contains the former Shepton Mallet Union Workhouse, a Grade II listed building of 1848. Later serving as the Norah Fry mental hospital, it is now a housing development. On the nearby western edge is a modern community hospital. Down the valley are the hamlets of Darshill, once the site of several mills, and Bowlish, which contains several grand clothiers' houses. The sloping fields by the river between Bowlish and the rest of Shepton are known as The Meadows. To their east is Hillmead, a council estate of the 1960s.

=== Climate ===
Like much of South West England, Shepton Mallet has a temperate climate wetter and milder than the rest of England. The annual mean temperature is about 10 °C (50 °F) with seasonal and diurnal variation, but due to the modifying effect of the sea, the range is less than in most other parts. January is coldest, with mean minimum between 1 and 2 °C (34 and 36 °F). July and August are warmest, with mean daily maxima around 21 °C (70 °F). In general December is the dullest month and June the sunniest. South-west England is favoured, particularly in summer, as the Azores High extends its influence north-eastwards to the UK.

Cloud often forms inland, especially near hills, and reduces exposure to sunshine. The average annual sunshine totals around 1600 hours. Rainfall tends to tie in with Atlantic depressions or with convection. In summer, convection caused by solar surface-heating sometimes forms shower clouds and much of the annual precipitation falls as showers and thunderstorms at that time of year. Average rainfall is 800–900 mm (31–35 in). About 8–15 days of snowfall is typical. November to March have the highest mean wind speeds, June to August the lightest. The prevailing wind is from the south-west.

== Demography ==
In the 2001 census the population was 8,981: 4,482 (49.9%) male and 4,499 (50.1%) female, with 1,976 (22%) aged 16 or below, 5,781 (64.4%) between 16 and 65, and 1,224 (13.6%) 65 or over.

Of those aged 16–74, 4,200 (66%) were employed and only 224 (3.5%) unemployed, the rest being economically inactive. About 69% of the employed were in service industries, the rest in manufacturing, while 1,459 people had managerial or professional occupations, 522 were self-employed, and 1,888 worked in routine and semi-routine occupations. Some 3,714 dwellings were recorded, of which 2,621 (70.6%) were owner-occupied, 515 (13.9%) rented privately and 578 (15.6%) from social landlords; 3,688 (99.3%) heads of households were white.

== Economy ==
It is felt locally that Shepton Mallet has been in economic decline for some time. Some 350 manufacturing jobs were lost in the late 1990s and early 21st century. However, the District Council asserts that despite the loss in manufacturing, on which Shepton Mallet historically depended, more jobs in distribution, business services and public administration, health, education, quarrying, construction and hi-tech services have been created, so creating a more balanced economy. In 2001, there were slightly more jobs in town than the economically active, giving a small influx.

The town centre has a high proportion of empty premises in Market Place and the adjacent north end of High Street, but the pedestrianised Town Street north of the Market Place to Waterloo Bridge has had marked investment in its heritage, bringing almost full occupancy. Since 2010 a quarter of independent shops is emerging in Town Street and Market Place. Since 2004 town-centre buildings have enjoyed a Heritage Economic Regeneration Scheme and a Townscape Heritage Initiative, which makes grants for building repair, reinstatement of architectural features and enhancement of public spaces, and for community involvement, education and training. As the body that bid for the funding, Mendip District Council has run both schemes, but decisions lie with a steering group of the main stakeholders in the town.

For centuries there has been a Friday market in the Market Place, but it has declined for some years. In 2010 there was initial interest in attempts to revitalise it, but the stallholder numbers still fell. In recent months a number of suitcase traders have supported the market on a regular basis, which has attracted local interest.

The furniture store Haskins, which originated in the town in 1938, has its main showroom in the High Street Haskins Retail Centre. This includes other shops: a supermarket, Edinburgh Woollen Mill, Ponden Home, Pavers Shoes and an outlet clothing store. Retail jobs rose in 2006–2007 with a new shopping development, including a Tesco supermarket, a clothes store and other retailers on a site just south of the town centre, once held by a footwear factory. This attracted national media attention when protesters occupied the site to try to block the felling of an avenue dating back to the 19th century. It also split opinion in the town between those awaiting revitalisation and those who feared that local traders would fail to compete, bringing further High Street decline. Kilver Street has a Mulberry Factory Shop near the old Mulberry headquarters.

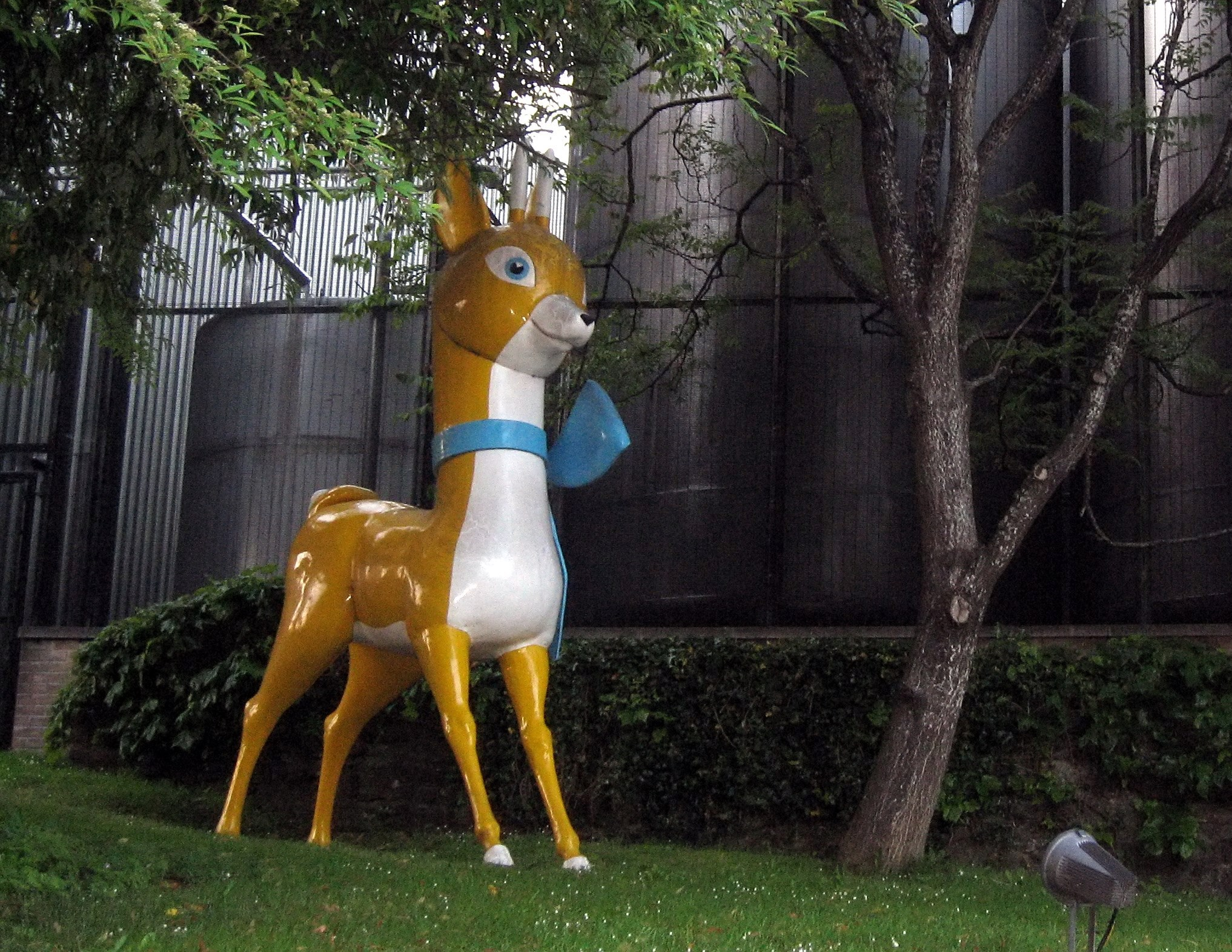
The Babycham fawn outside the brewery

Shepton Mallet housed three major alcoholic drinks producers. Gaymer Cider Company closed in 2016. Constellation Brands, former owners of Gaymers, still produces Babycham. Family-run Brothers Drinks produces Brothers Cider and runs a contract bottling operation for other drinks firms. In October 2016 it was announced that the cider factory and bottling plant would be taken over by Brothers Drinks.

As well as an annual Royal Bath and West Show and other agricultural shows, the Royal Bath & West Showground near Evercreech, 2.5 mi (4.0 km) south-east of the town, hosts events such as New Wine Christian festival and the National Adventure Sports Show, fairs and markets including Shepton Mallet International Antiques & Collectors' Fair, and exhibitions and trade shows such as the National Amateur Gardening Show. Until 2017, Royal Bath and West Show hosted the Soul Survivor Christian festivals.

== Transport ==
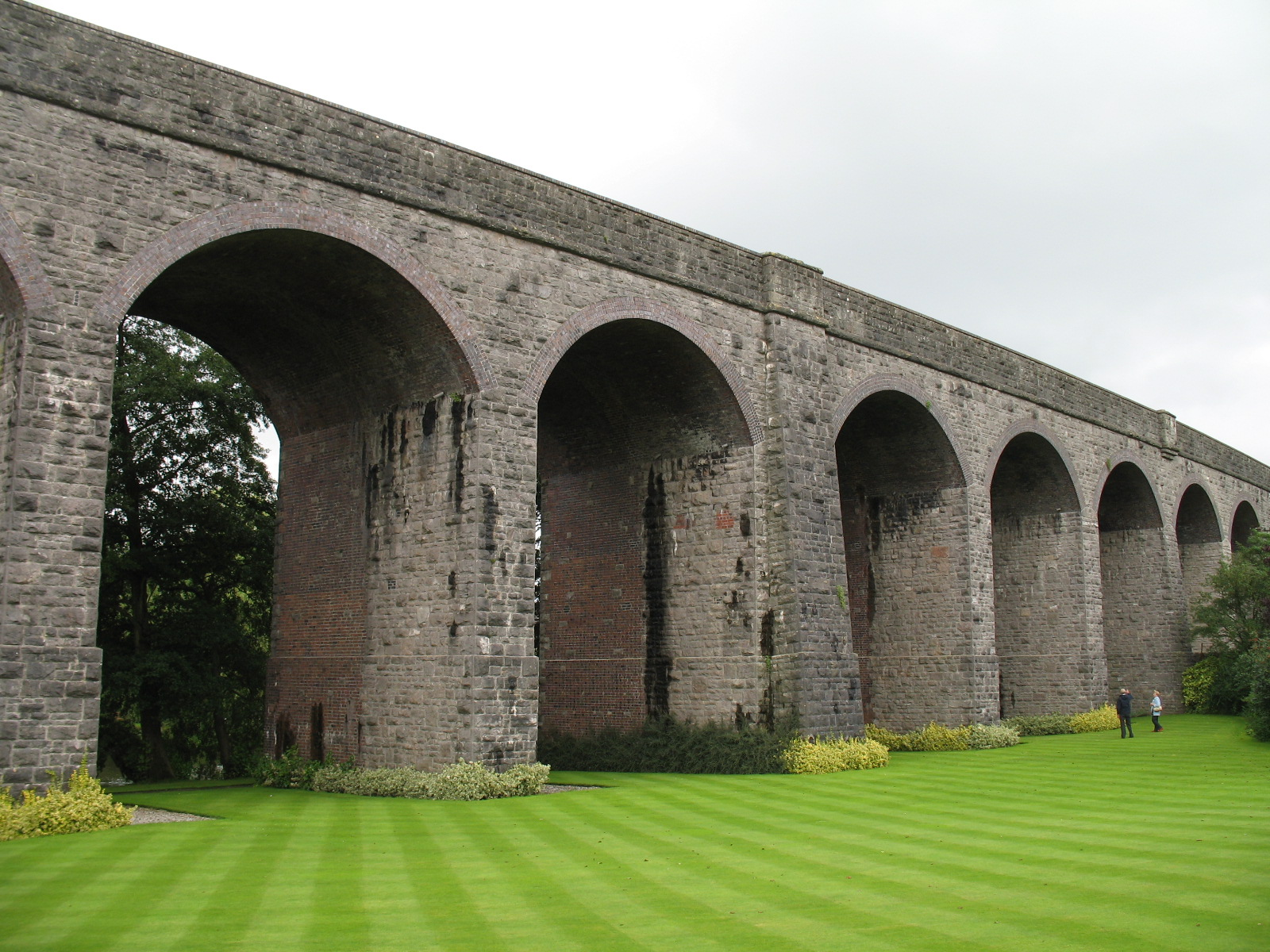
Charlton Viaduct seen from Kilver Court Gardens

The A37 runs north–south through Shepton Mallet along the line of the Fosse Way between the south of the town and Ilchester. The A361 from Frome and Trowbridge skirts the eastern edge of Shepton on its way to Glastonbury and Taunton. The A371 from Castle Cary passes through on its way west to Wells; for some distance, both routes follow the line of the A37. The nearest motorway connections are at junction 23 of the M5 motorway via the A361 and A39 and at junction 1 of the M32 via the A37.

Shepton Mallet had railway stations on two lines, both now closed. The first, called Shepton Mallet (High Street) in British railways days, was on the East Somerset Railway branch line from Witham and opened in 1859. It was extended to Wells in 1862 and later connected to the Cheddar Valley line branch of the Bristol & Exeter Railway from Yatton to Wells via Cheddar. Through services between Yatton and Witham started in 1870. The line was absorbed into the Great Western Railway in the 1870s.

A second, Shepton Mallet (Charlton Road) railway station, opened in 1874 with the building of a Bath extension to the Somerset & Dorset Joint Railway. This station was some distance east of the town centre and approached over Charlton Viaduct.

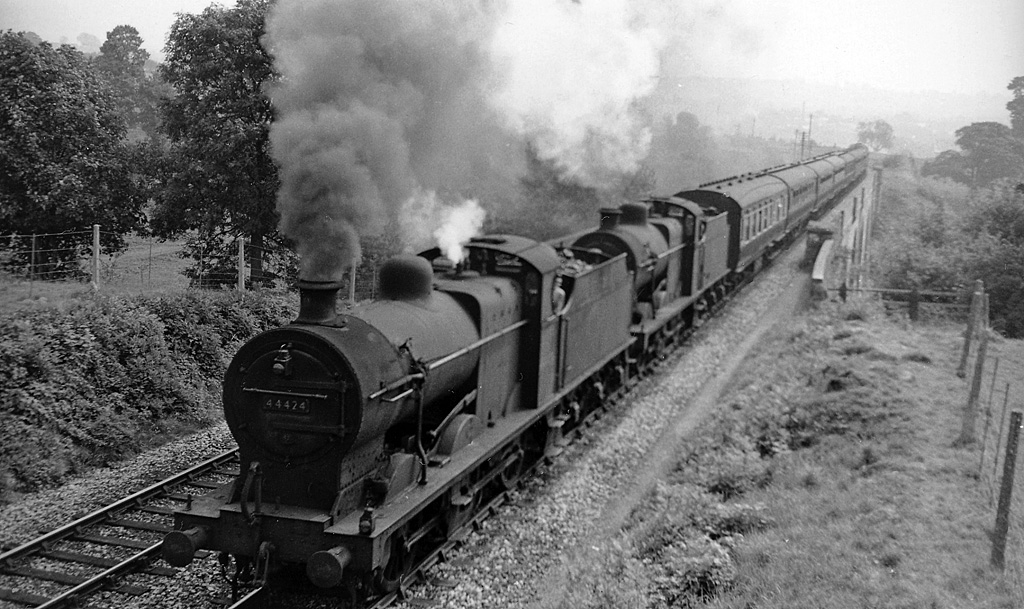
The Somerset & Dorset Joint Railway Bath – Bournemouth line near Shepton Mallet in 1959

Both stations closed in the 1960s under the Beeching cuts. Shepton Mallet (High Street) lost its passenger services on the Yatton to Witham line in 1963, though part of the old East Somerset line remains open for freight and as a heritage railway. Shepton Mallet (Charlton Road) was lost in 1966 with the closure of the Somerset & Dorset line. Today the nearest Network Rail station is at Castle Cary, eight miles (13 km) south of Shepton Mallet. The nearest station on the East Somerset Railway is Mendip Vale, a mile and a half away. Proposals endorsed by Mendip District Council exist to restore passenger services in Shepton Mallet, endorsed by Mendip District Council and Wells MP James Heappey.

A bus service to the town is provided by First West of England. It is served by Berrys Coaches' daily Superfast service to and from London.

== Landmarks ==
There are 218 listed buildings in Shepton Mallet, which receives funding to restore chosen town-centre buildings from English Heritage Heritage Economic Regeneration Scheme and the National Lottery Townscape Heritage Initiative. The town centre and Bowlish, Darshill and Charlton form a conservation area.

The hexagonal town-centre market cross, 50 ft (15 m) high, dates from a £20 bequest by Walter Buckland in 1520 and was re-erected in 1841. Also in the market place is the Shambles, a medieval market stall, though much restored. Former HM Prison Shepton Mallet, sometimes known as Cornhill, was built in 1610. It lies close to the town centre, next to the parish church. On 10 January 2013, the government announced it was one of seven English prisons to close. On 24 December 2014 it was announced that it had been sold to a housing development company and public consultations were taking place on its future use.

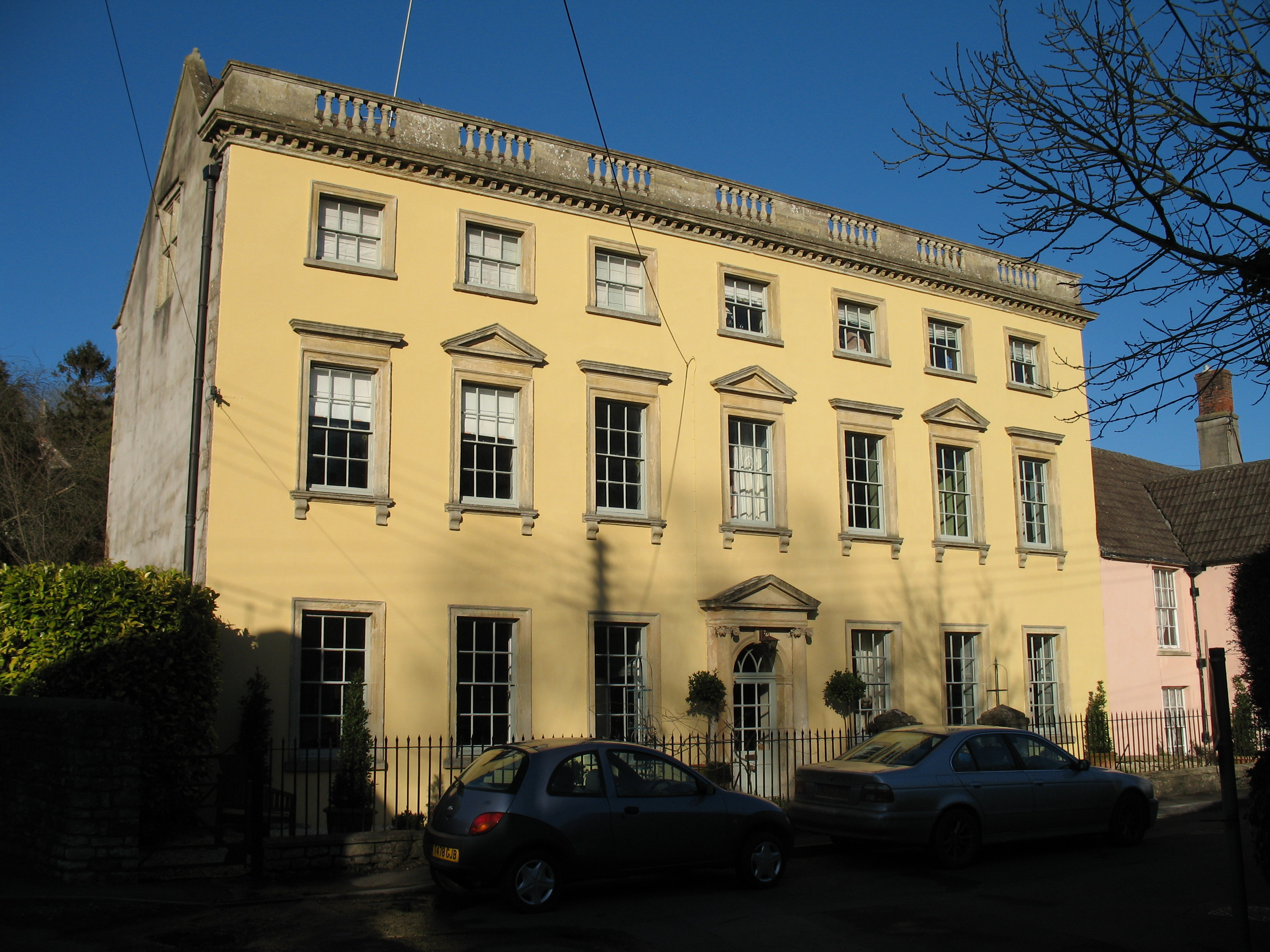
Old Bowlish House (grade II*listed)

There are several fine houses in older parts of the town around Lower Lane and Leg Square, and in outlying suburbs such as Charlton and Bowlish. Old Bowlish House, which now offers pre-arranged tours, dates from the earlier 17th century and was remodelled in about 1720 in Palladian style. Bowlish House, also in Palladian style, is now a hotel and restaurant. It was built in 1732 by a prosperous clothier. A spring is reported to rise in the cellar. Park House in Forum Lane dates from about 1700 and was altered about 1750. Others of the 19 Grade II listed buildings in Bowlish include Coombe House, built about 1820, 14, 15 and 16 Combe Lane, from about 1700 with 18th-century alterations, 26–29 Combe Lane, a former mill from about 1700, enlarged in 1850, and 30–31 Combe Lane, two weaver's cottages from about 1850. What is now a stained glass studio in Ham Lane was once a coal store for a stable belonging to a pub next door, the Butcher's Arms, which ceased trading in 1860. The studio has provided stained glass, among others for the Roman Catholic Church of the Holy Ghost, Midsomer Norton. Due to its historic nature, Bowlish is included in Shepton Mallet's conservation area, as well as being a site of archaeological interest.

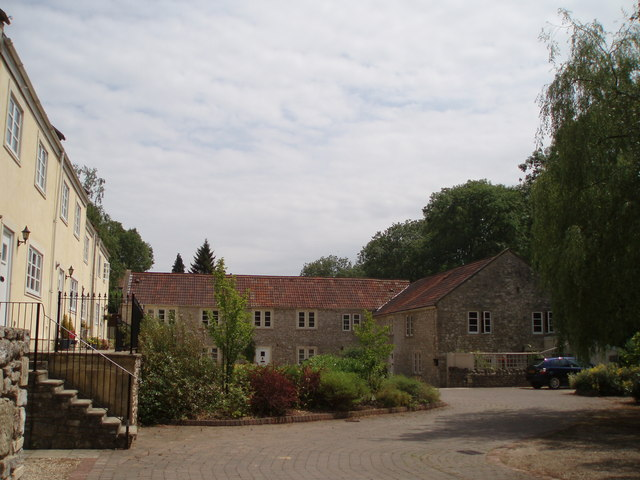
Darshill Silk Mill

The hamlet of Darshill on the road from Shepton Mallet to Wells has a silk-drying shed, known locally as a handle house, three walls of which are full of holes to allow the passage of air to aid in the process of drying teasle heads, which were used to raise the nap on cloth in the textile process.

The Anglo-Bavarian Brewery built in the 1860s still dominates the western parts of Shepton Mallet; nearby is a workhouse that became the Norah Fry Hospital, built in 1848 and has now converted into housing. Two disused railway viaducts are to be found: Charlton Viaduct with 27 arches, each spanning 28 feet (8.5 m) is on a curve of 30 chains radius falling at 1 in 55 from each end to the midpoint.

The market cross, the prison and prison wall, The Merchants House (8 Market Place), Anglo-Bavarian Brewery, Charlton Viaduct, the former St Michael's Roman Catholic Church at Townsend, and Bowlish House, Old Bowlish House and Park House are the town's nine Grade II* listed buildings.

The town centre was remodelled in the 1970s with moneys from the cider-making Showering family. Included was a new library (a copy of a demolished inn, The Bunch of Grapes), and a concrete entertainment complex, The Centre, on the east side of the market square. A probably Roman Chi Rho amulet was found in Fosse Lane in the 1990s – the complex was renamed The Amulet after it, but is now The Academy.

Shepton has a sizeable park on a gift of land from the local landowner John Kyte Collett. As a boy he was thrown out of the grounds of local estates for trespass. In later life he purchased and gave land to the town to provide a public space; Collett Park, named in his honour, opened in 1906.

== Religious sites ==
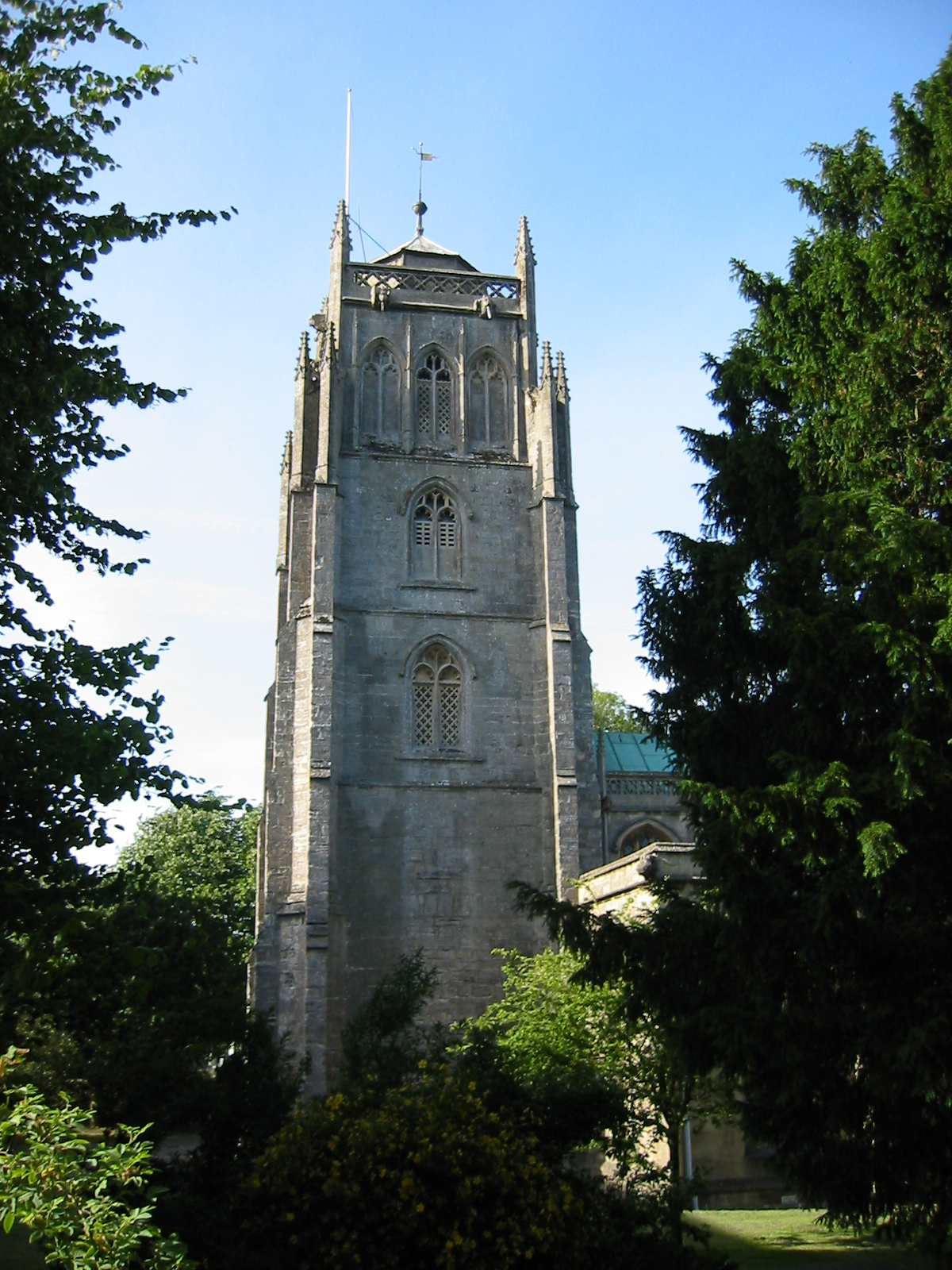
Parish church of St Peter and St Paul

The Grade I listed parish church of St Peter and St Paul dates from the 12th century, but the current building is largely from the 15th century, with further rebuilding in 1836. The oak wagon roof, made up of 350 panels of different designs separated by 396 carved foliage bosses (supposedly every one different) and with 36 carved angels along the sides, was described by British historian Nikolaus Pevsner as "the finest 15th-century carved oak wagon-roof in England". It was restored at a cost of £5,000, in 1953–1954.

St Michael's Roman Catholic Church of 1804 is now a warehouse. A Catholic church of 1966 in Park Road, is served by the Community of Our Lady of Glastonbury. There was also in 1810–1831 a convent of the Order of the Visitation of Holy Mary (Salesian Sisters) in Draycott Road. The building, now Sales House, became a Freemasons' lodge, and now holds social housing.

The Salvation Army has meeting rooms, while the Methodists, who previously worshipped in a chapel in Paul Street (built in 1810, now a community centre), have agreed to share the parish church with the Anglican congregation. The Baptist Chapel in Commercial Road was built in 1801 as a Congregational Church. There were previously other non-conformist chapels in Shepton, the most notable being the Unitarian Chapel on Cowl Street, built in 1692 and enlarged in 1758, but now a dwelling.

== Education ==
There is one primary school in the town and two infant schools. St Paul's Junior School, the primary school, in Paul Street was assessed as good in 2014. Shepton Mallet Infants School in Waterloo Road was rated good by Ofsted in 2018, as was Bowlish Primary School in 2012.

Education for 11–16 year olds is provided by Whitstone School, a Technology College. In 2013, it was assessed by Ofsted as good.

For post-16 education, students travel to colleges such as Frome Community College, Strode College in Street, and Norton Radstock College in Midsomer Norton.

== Culture ==
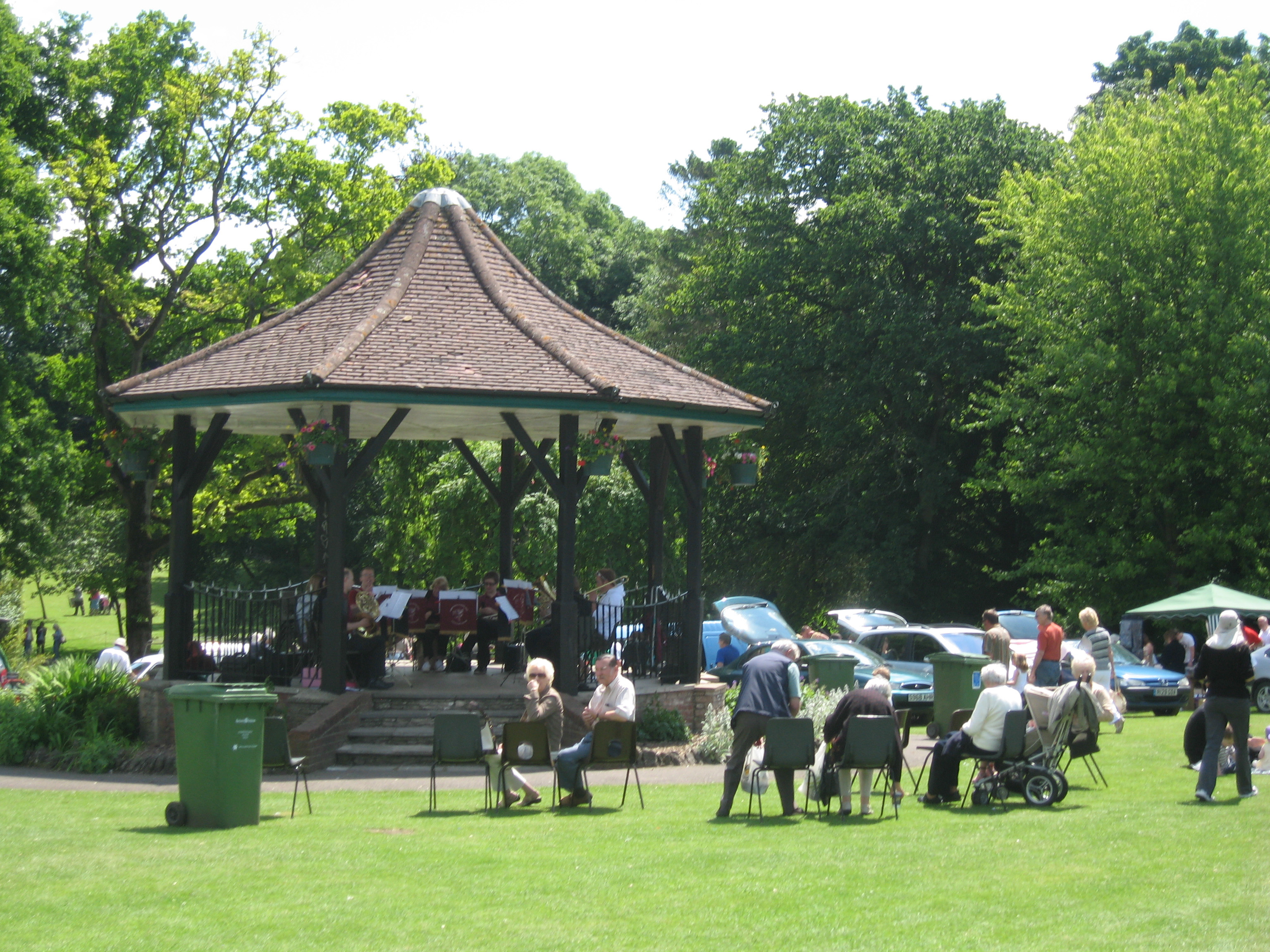
Collett Park on Collett Day

A town fete called Collett Day is held in June in Collett Park. A free one-day agricultural Mid-Somerset Show is held in fields on the edge of Shepton Mallet in August.

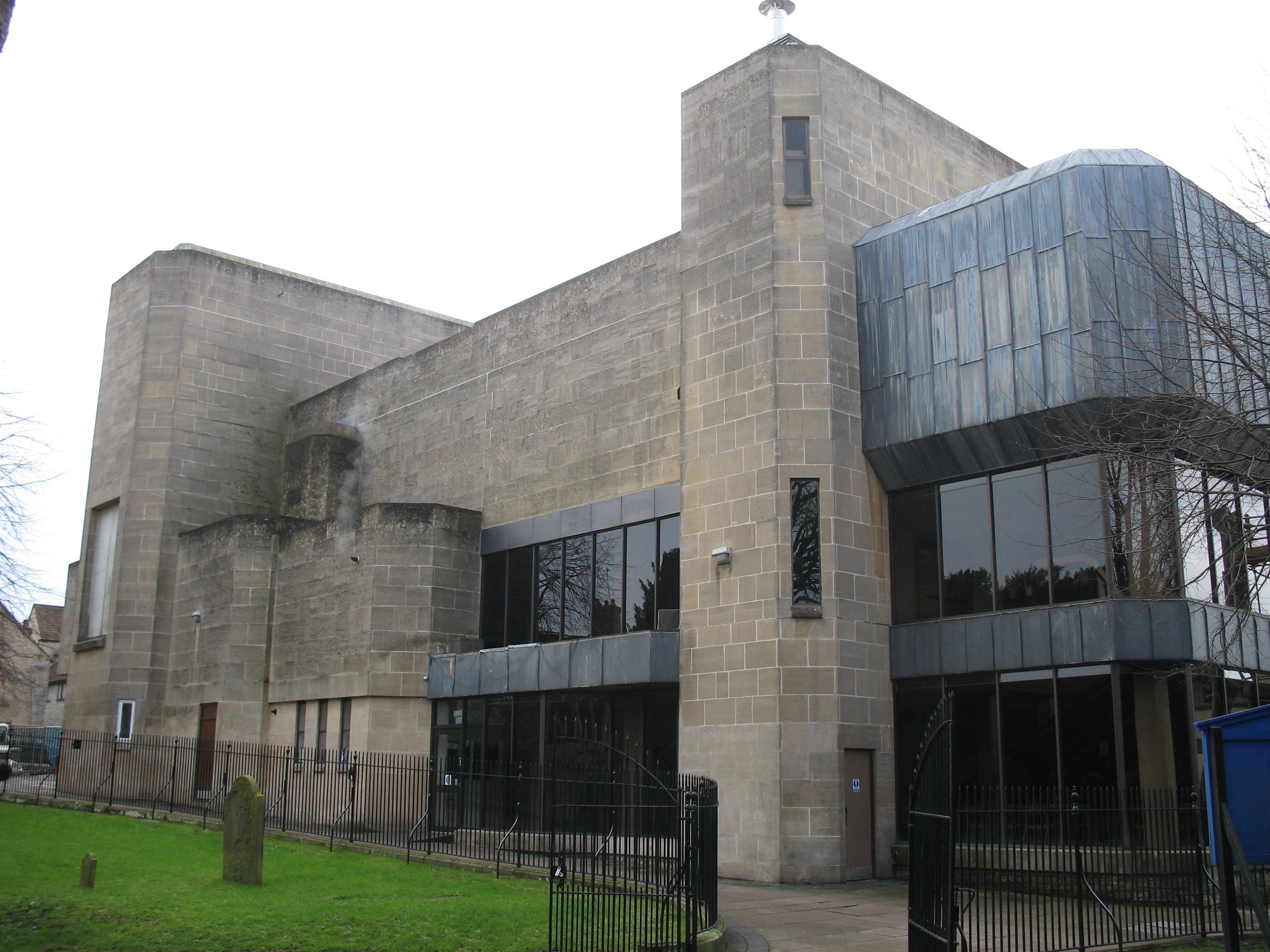
The Academy (formerly The Amulet)

The Glastonbury Festival, Europe's largest music festival, is held slightly west of the village of Pilton, some 3.5 miles (5.6 km) south-west of Shepton. The Bath Festival of Blues and Progressive Music 1970 was held at Shepton Mallet. The town hosts an annual Shepton Mallet Digital Arts Festival founded in 2009.

The town is holds a carnival featuring illuminated carts and masqueraders in November. It is the 5th Carnival in the West Country Carnival Circuit.

In 2007, The Amulet complex in the town centre became a base for the Bristol Academy of Performing Arts (BAPA) and was renamed The Academy. In 2009, BAPA went into administration and was briefly replaced by the Musical Theatre School, before that also failed. The complex's auditorium has the only suspended seating system in the United Kingdom.

The town's weekly newspaper, part of the Mid Somerset Series, is the Shepton Mallet Journal. Events are also covered by the Shepton Gazette, Fosse Way Magazine and Mendip Times.

Local news and television programmes are provided by BBC West and ITV West Country. Television signals are received from the Mendip TV transmitter.

Local radio stations are BBC Radio Somerset, Heart West, Greatest Hits Radio South West and Radio Shepton, a community-based station that broadcasts online.

In 2007, Shepton Mallet came to international attention when Westcountry Farmhouse Cheesemakers broadcast the maturation of a round of Cheddar cheese called Wedginald. The event attracted over 1.5 million viewers.

In the summer of 2010, the television production company Wall to Wall filmed a series for BBC One in the town centre, broadcast from 2 November 2010. Called Turn Back Time – The High Street, it features several families running traditional bakers, butchers, grocers, dressmakers and a tea room, as they would have been in Victorian and Edwardian times, in World War II, and in the 1960s and 1970s.

There was a museum in the town, started around 1903. In 1933 it was based at the town council offices.

== Sport and leisure ==
Shepton Mallet has a Non-League football club, Shepton Mallet F.C., which plays at the Playing Fields. It also has a hockey club, which play at the Leisure Centre.

Shepton Mallet Lido was refurbished in 2014, with its pool heated by waste heat from the nearby Brothers Drinks factory.

The bowling green of the lawn bowls club is found in Frithfield Walk. The club plays in the Wessex Mixed Friendly League, the Mid Somerset Men's League and the Mid Somerset Mixed League. The ladies play in the Wild League. Shepton Mallet is also the home of a park-run, a free 5km event held weekly at 9:00 am on Saturdays in the towns Collett Park.

== Notable people ==
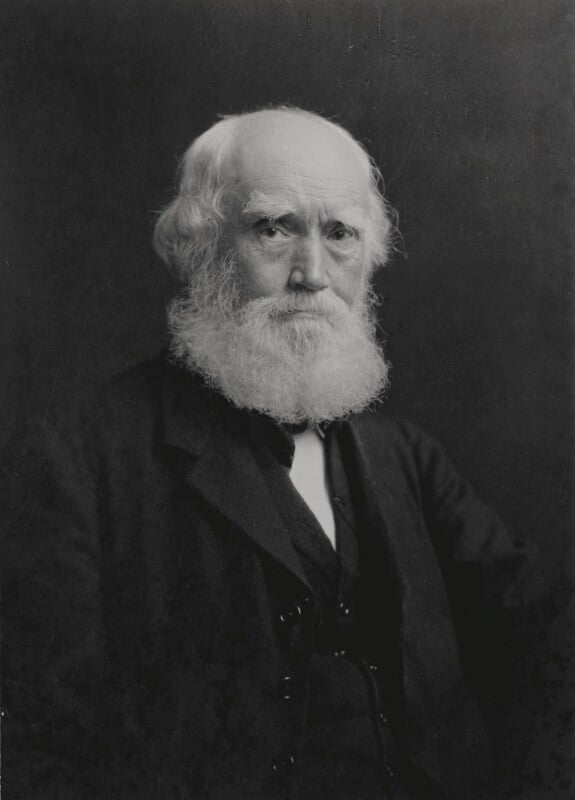
John Lewis, 1920s

- Edmund Adams (1915–2005), cricketer.
- Simon Browne (1680–1732), a dissenting preacher and theologian, preached at Old Jewry in London and in Portsmouth.
- Christopher Cazenove (1945–2010), cinema, television and stage actor, lived at Ham Manor in Bowlish as a child.
- William Henry Coombes (1767–1850), Catholic theologian, was a priest in Shepton Mallet in 1810–1849, then retired to nearby Downside Abbey.
- Charles Dowding (born 1959), horticulturalist and author, has pioneered modern No-dig gardening and organic soil management.
- Herbert Foxwell (1849–1936), economist.
- Arthur Foxwell (1853–1909), an English physician.
- Sir Ronald Gould (1904–1986), general secretary of the National Union of Teachers in 1947–1970, was educated at Shepton Mallet Grammar School.
- Madeleine Harris (born 2001), actress grew up locally, she starred in Paddington and its sequel.
- Racey Helps (1913–1970), children's writer and illustrator, lived in the town in the 1940s.
- Hugh Inge or Ynge (died 1528), Archbishop of Dublin and Lord Chancellor of Ireland, was a native of Shepton Mallet.
- John Lewis (1836–1928), founder of the British John Lewis group, was born in Town Street.
- Francis Showering (1912–1995), drinks manufacturer and inventor of Babycham, was born in the town.
- Ken Snellgrove (1941–2009), cricketer, played in 106 first-class cricket matches for Lancashire.
- Frank Tuohy (1925–1999), novelist and short-story writer, lived in Shepton Mallet after retirement and died there.
- Wallace Wyndham Waite (1881–1971), one founder of Waitrose, attended Shepton Mallet Grammar School.

== Twin towns ==
Shepton Mallet is twinned with Misburg in Germany, Bollnäs in Gävleborg County, Sweden, and Oissel sur Seine in Haute-Normandie, France.
