= Brothers Cider =

Cider brewery in the UK

Coordinates: 51°11′29″N 2°33′04″W

- Product type: Apple and pear cider
- Produced by: Showering Brothers
- Country: Shepton Mallet, England
- Introduced: 1992; 34 years ago
- Markets: International
- Website: brotherscider.co.uk

Brothers Cider is a brand of fruit cider originating in Somerset in South West England. Originally available at music festivals, it is now sold in pubs, bars, and stores across the United Kingdom and internationally in countries such as Thailand, Singapore, and China.

== History ==
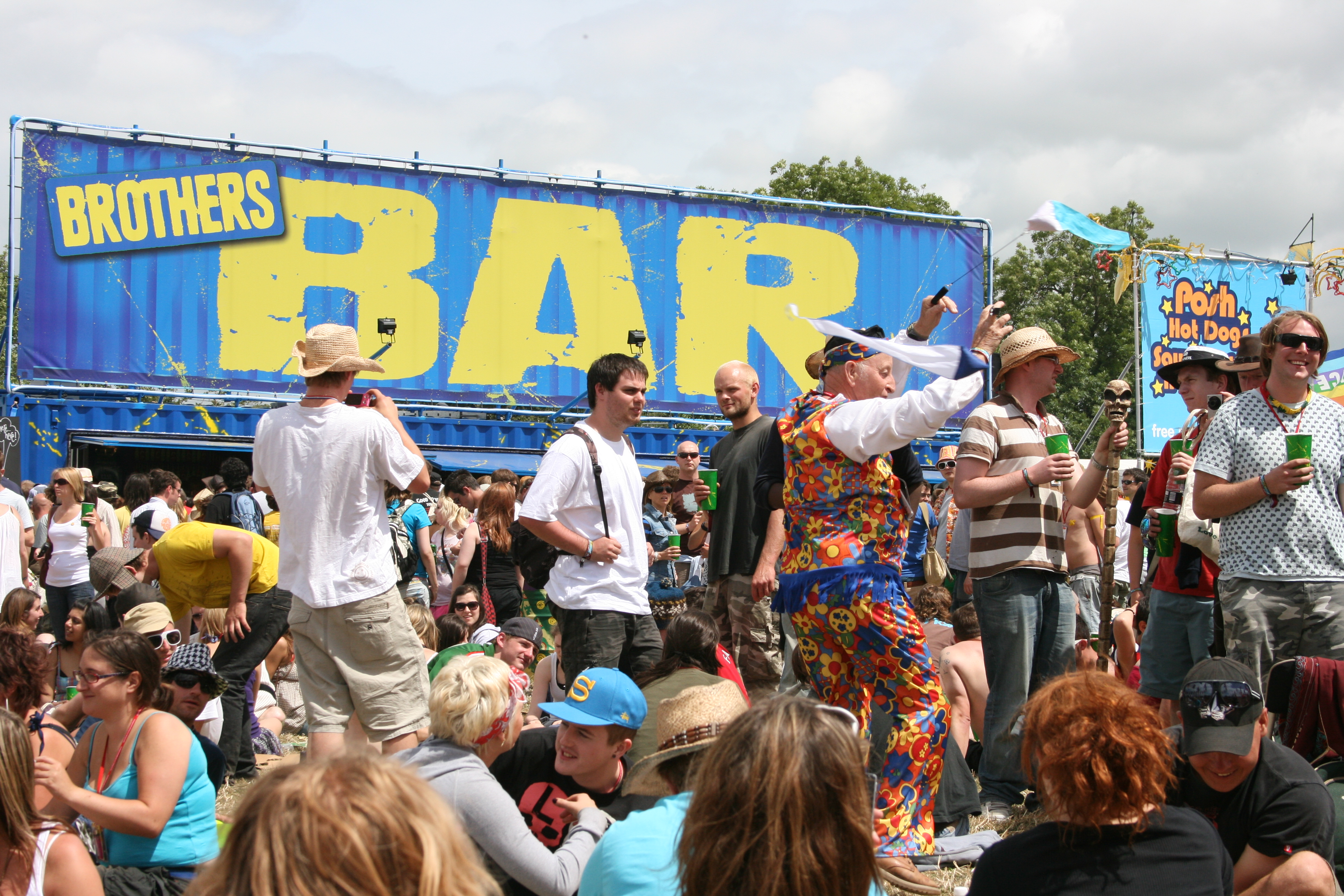
The Brothers Bar at Glastonbury 2008

Brothers Drinks Co. Limited was started in 1992 by four Showering brothers, whose parents were involved with the production of Babycham from the 1950s. It is based in Shepton Mallet, Somerset. Brothers' Cider is fermented and bottled at the Showerings Cider Mill and on the former site of the Anglo-Bavarian Brewery, which has been claimed as the first lager brewery in the United Kingdom, although the claim is disputed.

In 1995, Michael Eavis offered the Brothers space for a bar at the Glastonbury Festival, near the Jazz World Stage, but with sales restricted to perry-based drinks. When the offer of "perry" was met with little understanding the Brothers would describe it as "like cider but made from pears" and after repeating this tens of thousands of times the shorthand "pear cider" was introduced and understood. Ten years later, in 2005, Brothers was packaged and launched into pubs and the retail trade.

In 2007, Brothers began bottling soft drinks for Fever-Tree. 50% of Brothers' capacity is accounted for by Fever-Tree. Brothers became a minority shareholder in Fever-Tree in 2013.

In 2009, Brothers Cider won a Cool Brand award at The Drum Marketing Awards.

In 2013 a new range of packaging was launched, for the company with a turnover of £46 million per annum.

In 2016, the Showering Brothers bought the Shepton Mallett Cider Mill from C&C Group plc but not the brands, returning ownership to the family that had founded it. Matthew Showering said "Our grandfather built the factory and so it's be great to get back there. We used to go there as children and it came out of the family business when it was sold to Allied Breweries in the late 60s so it's great to reconnect with the place."

In 2021, the Showering Brothers acquired the famous brand most associated with their cider mill when they bought Babycham.

On 15 February 2024, Brothers announced that they were re-launching with 4 new flavours. They are App-Solutely Pear-fect, Un-Berrylievable, Best of the Zest and Berry Sub-Lime. They will be available in 500ml cans, 330ml sleek can or 6x330ml sleek can multipacks. These 4 flavours will replace all current offerings, bringing an end to glass bottles and sweet Brothers flavours.

== Flavours ==
Flavour	Launched	Notes
Cherry Bakewell	11 March 2022	
Cloudy Lemon	Re-launched in 2021	One of the original flavours, unsure when it was discontinued before re-launch in 2021.
Honeycomb	21 March 2021	
Marshmallow	1 April 2020	
Parma Violet	29 March 2019	
Pink Grapefruit	14 March 2021	
Rhubarb & Custard	Relaunched 2017	
Strawberries & Cream	29 March 2019	
Strawberry & Lime		
Toffee Apple		
Toffee Apple (Alcohol Free)	5 May 2021	First Alcohol Free cider from Brothers
Wild Fruit		
Tutti Frutti		Only available in 330ml bottles
Raspberry Ripple	6 March 2023	
Coconut & Lime		Currently discontinued. Was a limited edition flavour in 2015
Strawberry & Kiwi		Currently discontinued. Was a limited edition flavour in 2015
