= Whitstone School =

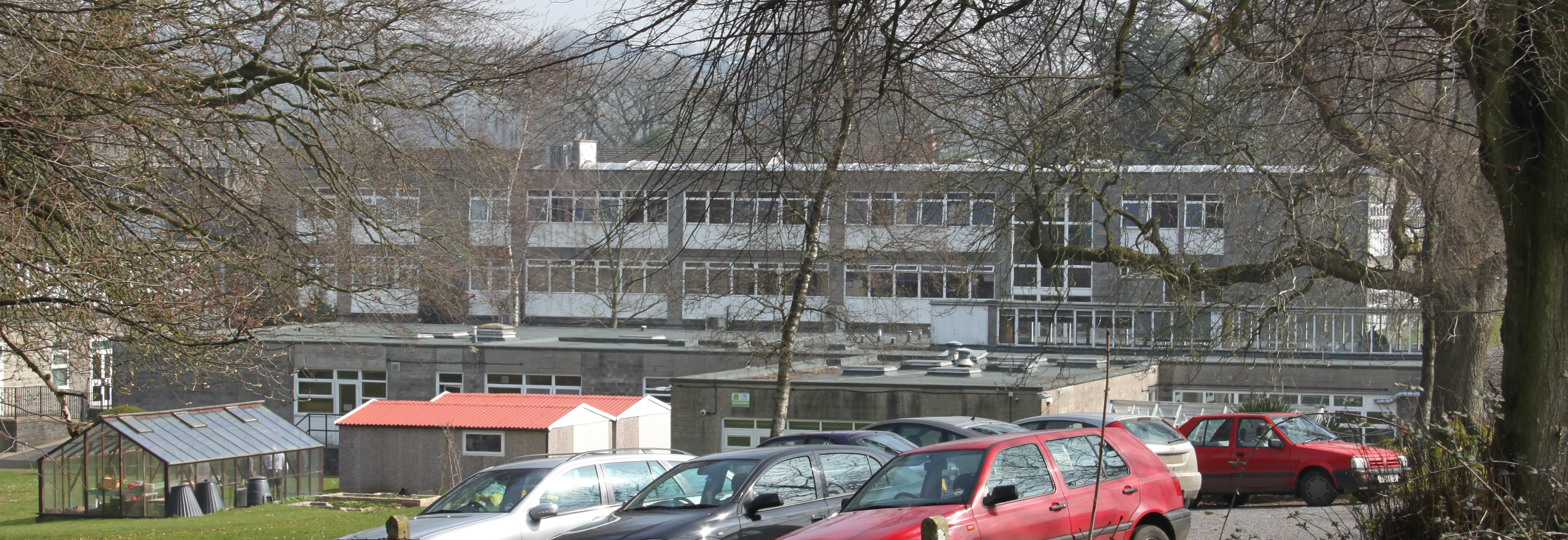

Location
- Charlton Road; Shepton Mallet, Somerset, BA4 5PF; England
- Coordinates: 51.1884°N 2.5420°W

Information
- Type: Academy
- Motto: Inspiring Futures
- Department for Education URN: 137192 Tables
- Ofsted: Reports
- Head: Matthew Pike
- Age: 11 to 16
- Enrolment: 584
- Houses: Buzzards, Red Kites, Peregrines, Kestrels
- Website: www.whitstoneschool.org

Whitstone School is located in Shepton Mallet, Somerset, England, and educates students aged between 11 and 16. The Headteacher is Matthew Pike, appointed in September 2025. In August 2011, the school became an academy, and in 2025 the school roll was 584 students.

== Academic performance ==
Since 2019, the school's GCSE performance has been well below the average of other schools in Somerset, however during its first full year as an academy, performance increased from 44% to 56% of students achieving five or more A* to C GCSE grades including English and mathematics. In 2017, it was assessed by Ofsted as "good" on a four-point scale of outstanding, good, requires improvement, or inadequate.

== Houses ==
The school has a house system. Currently, there are 4 houses: Buzzards (blue, formerly known as Quantock), Red Kites (red, formally known as Polden), Peregrines (yellow, formerly known as Blackdown), and Kestrels (green, formerly known as Mendip). The current names are inspired by bird species common to the Somerset area. Previously, the houses were named after local hill ranges, three of which are designated Areas of Outstanding Natural Beauty. Each house colour is reflected on the school uniform.
