= Mid-Somerset Show =

Agricultural show in England

Coordinates: 51°11′05″N 2°32′44″W

Judging at the 153rd Mid-Somerset Show

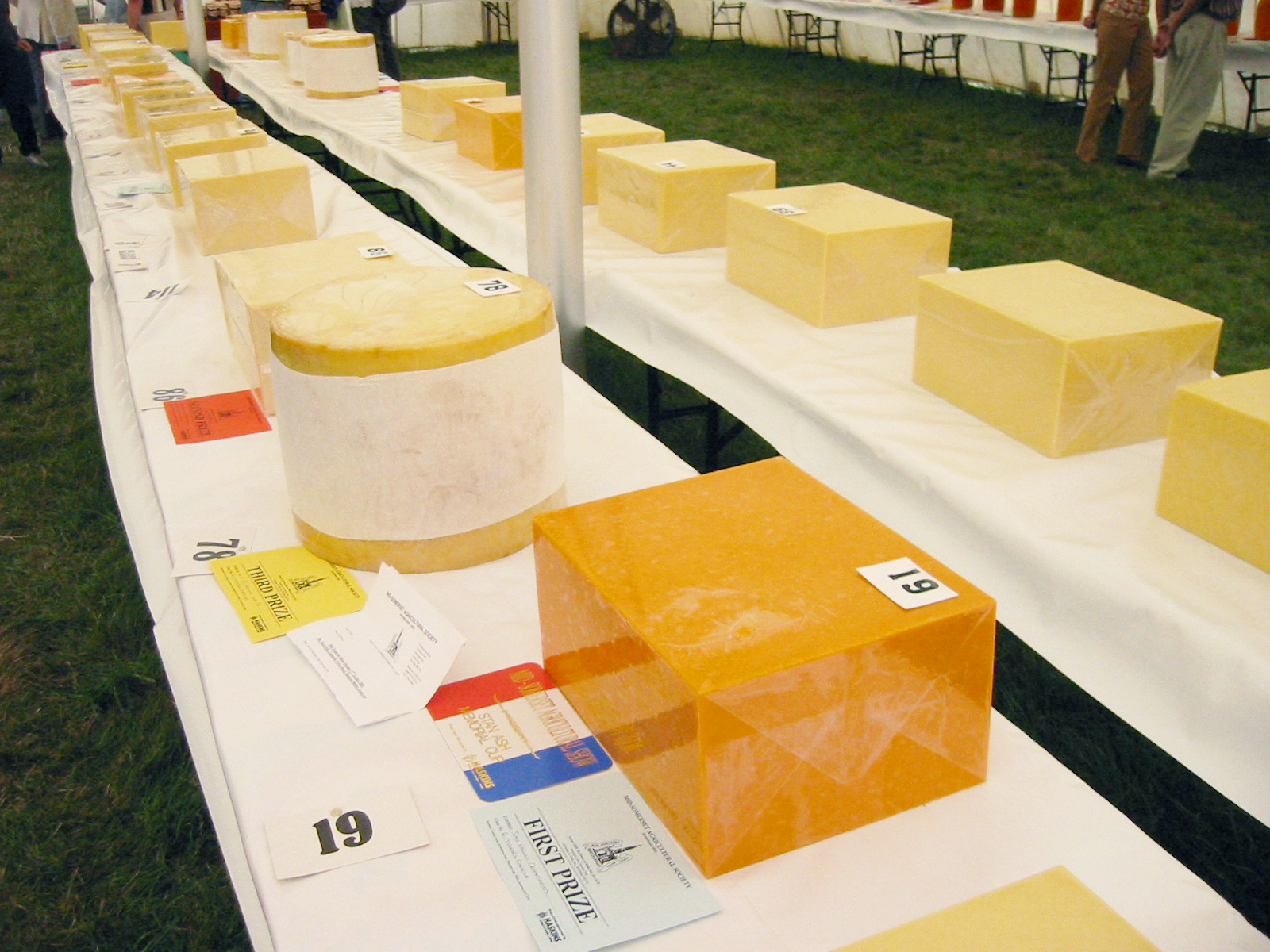
The cheese tent at the 2003 show

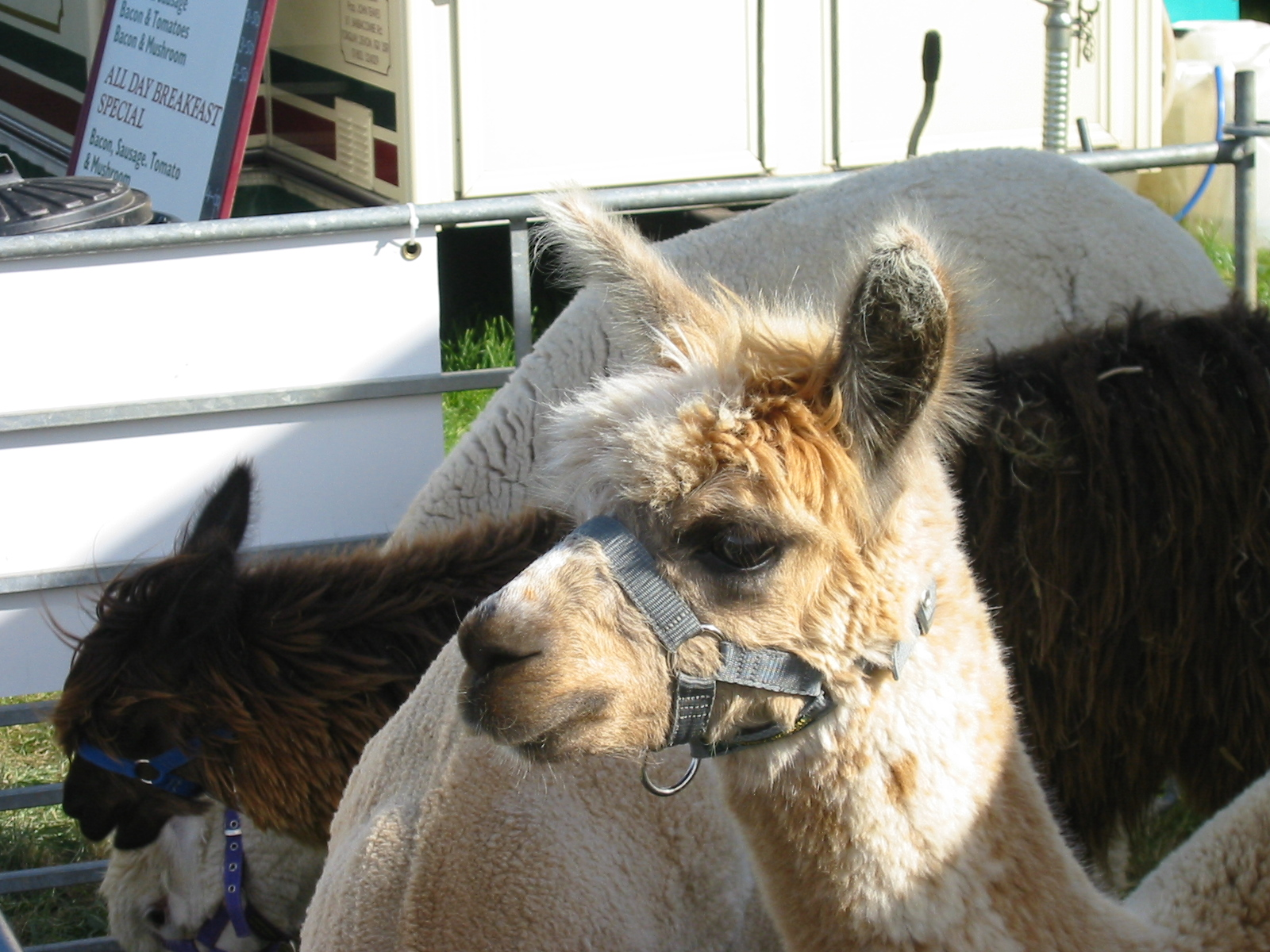
Alpacas at the 2005 show

The Mid-Somerset Show, also known as Shepton Show, is a one-day agricultural show held annually in August on a site at Shepton Mallet, Somerset, England. Founded over 150 years ago, the show displays and celebrates agriculture and livestock rearing, crafts and hobbies, local heritage and farming history. Competitions are held for animals, produce and handicrafts in a wide range of classes. Other attractions include trade stands, craft demonstrations and amusements.

== History ==
The show began life as a ploughing match between local farmers organised by the Evercreech Farmers Club but by the 1870s this had metamorphosed into a cattle show, appropriate given the dairy farming in the region. Separate classes existed for horses, and for cheese and butter-making. The show championed agricultural improvement and the increased saleability of two local products, Cheddar cheese and cider. Despite breaks for two World Wars, the show thrived. After the centenary year in 1952 the show gradually lost importance as older trades died and farming and food production became more industrialised.

A rekindling of interest in rural life and a backlash against intensive agriculture have been suggested to explain the recent recovery of the show's fortunes, despite the competition of larger regional shows such as the Bath and West show held only 3 km (1.9 mi) away. It seems more popular than previously in the local community. Since 2002 there has been no admission fee to the show although charges are made for competition entries.

== The show today ==
The 153rd show in August 2005 attracted a record (estimated) 15,000 people. Competition classes were held in:

- Cattle
- Horses
- Sheep
- Pigs
- Fodder
- Cheese
- Cider
- Arts and Crafts
- Flower Show and Floral Art
- Bees and Honey
- Classic, Vintage and Steam Vehicles
