= Babycham =

Brand of sparkling perry

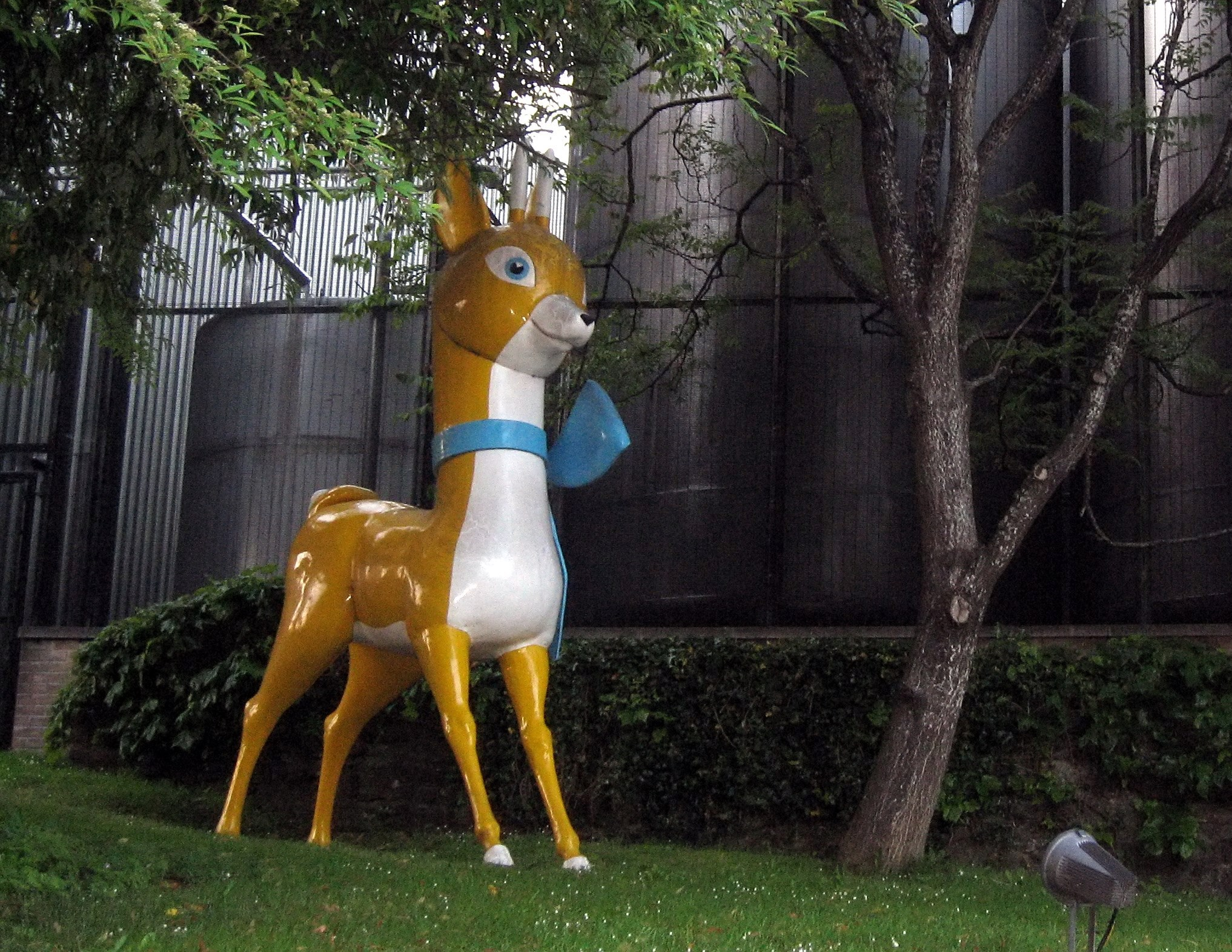
- Babycham trademark chamois outside the factory in Shepton Mallet
- Type: Perry, alcoholic drink
- Distributor: Accolade Wines
- Origin: United Kingdom, Somerset
- Introduced: 1953
- Alcohol by volume: 6%
- Proof (US): 12°
- Ingredients: Pear, soda water
- Related products: Champagne, sparkling wine
- Website: www.babycham.co.uk

Babycham (/ˈbeɪbiːʃæm/) is a light (6% ABV), sparkling perry invented by Francis Showering, a brewer in Shepton Mallet, Somerset, England. The name was owned by Accolade Wines until 2021, when it was bought back into the Showering family business Brothers Drinks Limited. The brand was particularly popular during the 1960s and 1970s. The new owners are planning a major rebrand and relaunch of the drink.

== History ==
Francis Showering first submitted his new drink to the Three Counties Agricultural Show and other agricultural shows in the late 1940s and early 1950s where it was found to be popular. Initially called "baby champ", it later became Babycham.

Launched in the United Kingdom in 1953, Babycham was the first alcoholic product to be advertised on British commercial television, the campaign being launched in 1957, with the drink originally marketed as a "genuine champagne perry". It was the first alcoholic drink aimed specifically at women and used the catchphrase "I'd Love a Babycham".

In 1965, the Babycham Company sued the food writer Raymond Postgate, founder of the Good Food Guide, for an article in Holiday magazine in which he warned readers against Babycham, which "looks like champagne and is served in champagne glasses [but] is made of pears". The company sued for libel, claiming the article implied it was dishonestly passing off Babycham as champagne. The judge in his summation stated that the article was defamatory, but that the jury could consider it as "fair comment" rather than a factual statement. The jury found for Postgate, and he was awarded costs.

During the 1960s, Showerings stopped brewing beer to concentrate on cider and perry. Production of Babycham went from 300 dozen bottles an hour to 2,800 dozen. At the peak in June 1973 144,000 bottles were being produced each hour. To supply the production line, perry pears were planted in Somerset, Gloucestershire, Worcestershire and Hereford. Until suitable trees could be grown locally, pear juice was imported from Switzerland. The profits helped to pay for the landscaping of the gardens at the company's headquarters at Kilver Court.

In 1978, the Babycham company was sued by French Champagne producers for abuse of their trade name. The case (H P Bulmer Ltd and Showerings Ltd v J Bollinger SA [1978] RPC 79) hinged on the fact that Babycham had been described in advertising as 'champagne perry' or 'champagne cider'. Champagne producers were litigating to protect their goodwill but because there would not actually be confusion, they were unsuccessful.

Sales were boosted in the 1980s by advertising using the slogans "Nothing sparkles like a Babycham" and the more contemporary "Hey, Babycham".

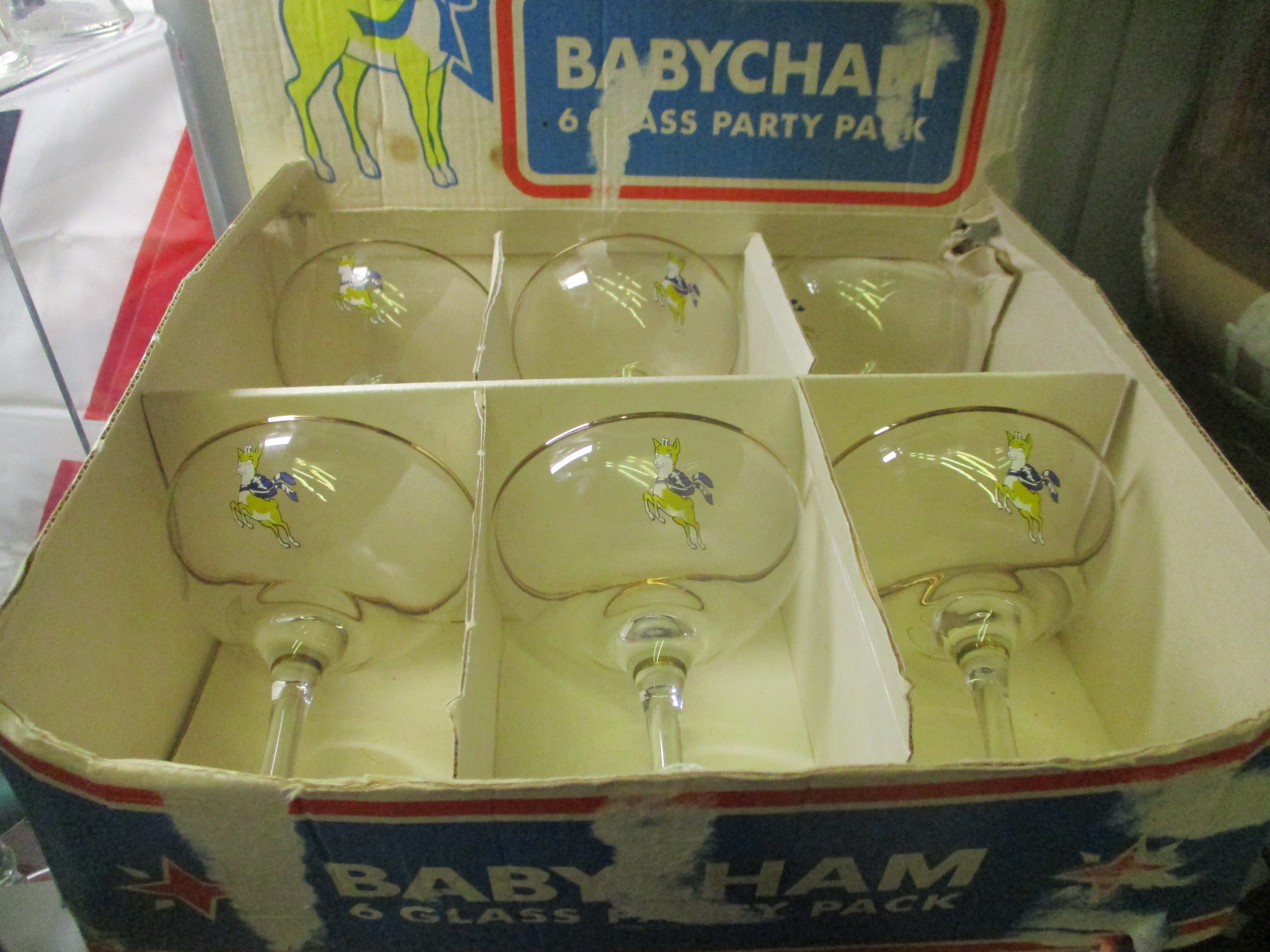
Babycham glasses for sale in an antiques shop in the Ridings Centre, Wakefield.

The brand's appeal waned with the rise of cheaply available alternatives and a tightening up of the regulations governing alcohol advertising on television. 1993 saw a major relaunch of the brand and the reintroduction of the chamois mascot, a giant model of which can be seen outside the Shepton Mallet factory where the drink is produced. 1997 saw the reintroduction of Babycham Babe beauty contests that had been popular in the 1960s. The iconic 'Babycham' logo was designed and created by John Emperor of Collett Dickenson Pearce.

The Showerings' company was bought by Allied Breweries in 1968 and with it the Babycham brand. The sons of the original Showerings founders went on to produce Brothers Cider, and in 2021 bought the Babycham brand back from its then owner Accolade Wines for an undisclosed sum.

== In the 2010s ==
During 2011 sales were reported to be increasing, with approximately 15 million bottles sold each year.

In 2013 a trademark dispute between Accolade Wines and the Cath Kidston home furnishings company was taken to the High Court.
