= Anglo-Bavarian Brewery =

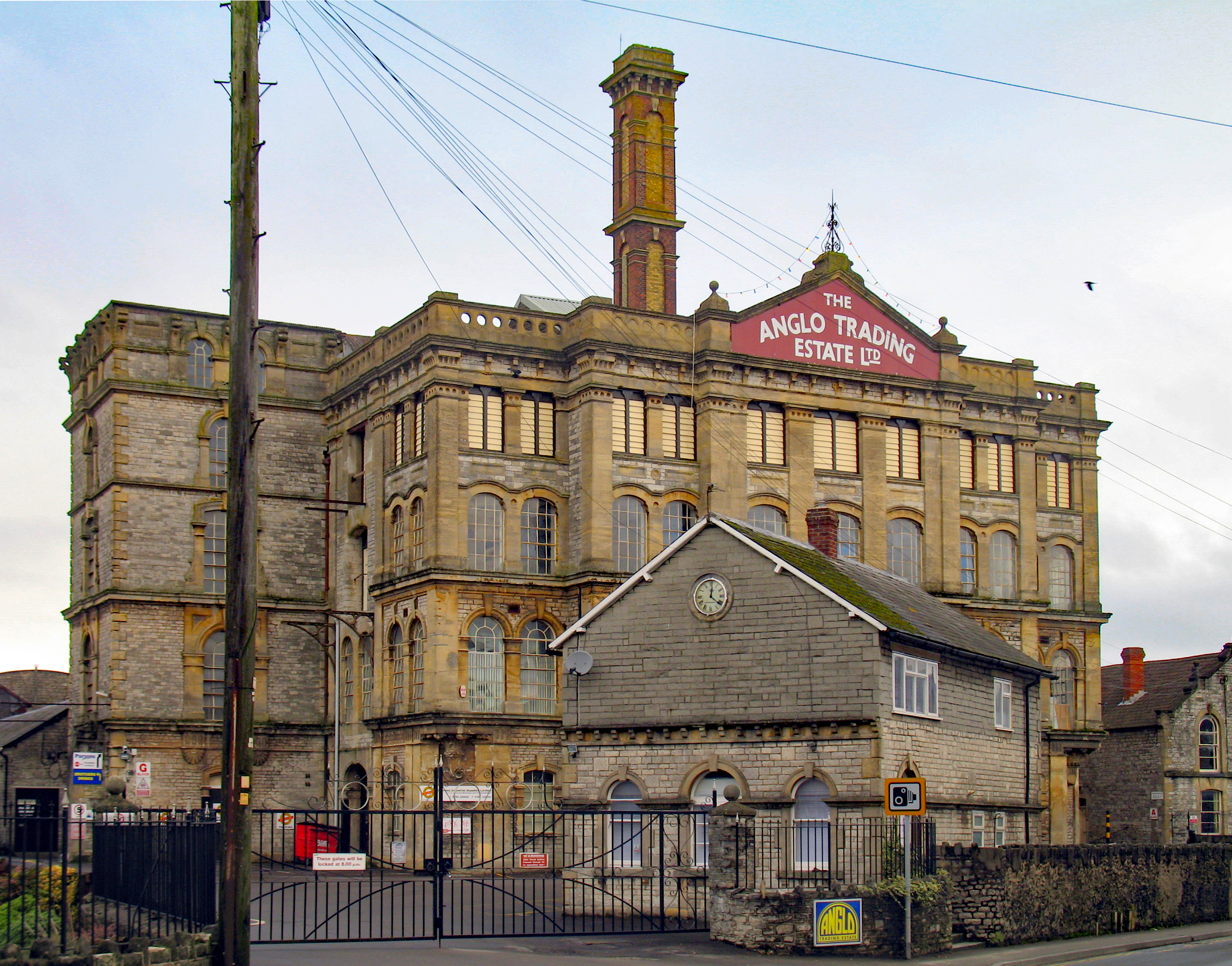
- The Anglo Trading Estate, Shepton Mallet

- Location within Somerset
- 51°11′29″N 2°33′04″W
- Type: Brewery
- Location: Shepton Mallet
- OS grid reference: ST 61614 43734

History
- Built: 1864

Site notes
- Area: Somerset
- Owner: J H Haskins & Son Ltd

Listed Building – Grade II*
- Official name: Anglo Trading Estate
- Designated: 21 September 1984
- Reference no.: 1296561

The Anglo-Bavarian Brewery was originally established in Shepton Mallet in Somerset, England in 1864. It has been claimed as the first lager brewery in the United Kingdom, although the claim is disputed. It closed in 1920. The building, now the Anglo Trading Estate, is a grade II* listed building and is on English Heritage's Heritage at Risk Register, and Mendip District Council's Historic Buildings at Risk Register.

== 1864 to 1914 – Establishment and Growth ==
The brewery was built, in 1864, for Morrice, Cox and Clarke of London, and was initially called the Shepton Mallet Pale Ale Brewery. During the construction work on the site, pottery kilns used to make Severn Valley Ware, dating from the 1st to 2nd century were discovered.

The limestone four-storey building was built in Italianate architecture, has five-storey towers at either side. The top floors, each 200 feet (61 m) long held barley and malt stores in six bins, each of which held 450 quarters and tanks for the water supply. Below these were the malting floors, supplied via wooden shoots, and kilns, one of which was measured as being 50 feet (15 m) by 14 feet (4.3 m).

In 1871, the business was sold by auction to Hill, Garton and Company of Southampton, who subsequently expanded and modernised it. In 1872 the Pale Ale Brewery was renamed the Anglo-Bavarian Brewery. It has been asserted that this was in reference to the employment, by the new owners, of some brewers from Bavaria in order to produce a German-style beer, and that what is now called lager was brewed from that year. The writer Alfred Barnard, who visited the brewery in 1890, refers to a report from the British Commission on Beers which describes a beer from the Anglo-Bavarian brewery exhibited in Vienna as "combining the special properties of high class English Ales, with those of the lighter beers brewed upon the Bavarian lines" which, it has been claimed, supports the belief that the Anglo-Bavarian was brewing a form of lager. However Barnard's account of his own visit to the brewery only mentions "running" ale (for immediate consumption) and "stock ale", and newspaper advertisements for the Anglo-Bavarian Brewery Company in the mid-1870s show it brewing pale ale, mild ale, strong ale, porter, stout and amber ale, but not lager.

The brewery site was lit throughout by electricity by 1889, generated by a dynamo powered by a steam engine, allowing work to continue at night. In 1890 the brewery employed over 200 people (compared with about 50 in the early 1870s).

There was no natural source of water on the brewery site and so water was supplied by the local water company. This was sufficient for a while but by the end of 19th century an additional source was required. A spring was discovered at Bowlish which proved able to provide seemingly unlimited supplies of very pure water.

Disposal of the effluents produced by the brewery were also a major problem and pollution of the River Sheppey was a source of much discontent amongst land owners further down the valley from 1877 until the closure of the brewery in 1921.

In 1890 it was reported that the beer brewed at the Anglo-Bavarian was sold throughout England and the Channel Islands by 250 agents. However the brewery’s main area of sales was export. Beginning in 1875, beer was transported to a bottler in London, from where it was shipped to Australia, New Zealand, India, South Africa, South America and the West Indies. Overseas sales were in the order of 1.8 million bottles per year.

As well as providing employment to Shepton Mallet, the Anglo-Bavarian Brewery also provided the services of its fire brigade to the town (and the wider surrounding area) between 1868 and 1921. The brewery fire brigade were called upon many times, most notably in 1904 for a fire at Shepton Mallet Prison.

== 1914 to 1921 – Decline and Closure ==
The reasons for the decline of the Anglo-Bavarian Brewery are various. Amongst them is anti-German feeling following the outbreak of the First World War in 1914. The inclusion of the word Bavarian on the label of the brewery's bottles led to them being removed from shop shelves throughout the United Kingdom and overseas. The Brewery and its beer were quickly renamed as Anglo but this did not have much effect and trade rapidly declined. The post-war recession and the rise of the temperance movement also helped to damage the chances of the Shepton Mallet brewery returning to its earlier levels of success.

By 1920 the brewery was employing only a few men and the Garton Company which still owned the Anglo Brewery was reviewing its business interests. In April 1921 all of the machinery, plant and other fittings of the brewery were put up for sale by auction, from the office furniture to the one remaining cart horse named Darling. In August of that year the brewery site itself, and all of the brewery’s lands including Bowlish House, was also put up for auction.

== 1927 to 1947 – Resurrection and Requisition ==
The brewery buildings were again put up for sale in 1926, this time for demolition purposes. However, there was little interest and the site remained intact. In 1927 the site was bought by a Mr Bennett who began to install new machinery, and by 1934 a new Anglo-Bavarian Brewery company was registered to once again carry on beer and cider production.

The word Bavarian was dropped again as the outbreak of the Second World War approached and in 1939 the brewery site (and all the machinery) was requisitioned by the Air Ministry. Cider production was transferred to a site in Darshill under the name of the Anglo Apple Mills.

== 1947 to date – The Anglo Trading Estate, and proposals for future development ==
After the War, half the site was restored to the Bennett family, but again without any machinery which had been removed to aid the war effort. In April 1947 the buildings began their new life as the Anglo Trading Estate, providing warehousing and distribution to a range of expanding local businesses such as Clarks the shoe-makers. The Air Ministry returned the remainder of the site in 1964.

Ownership of the Trading Estate later passed to J H Haskins & Son Ltd, owners of the prominent furniture store in Shepton Mallet. In March 2008, they published plans to redevelop the site to include a hotel and conference facilities, as well as shops, offices, pubs, cafes, restaurants, a recording studio and housing. It is used for the production of Brothers Cider.

It is included in the Heritage at Risk Register produced by English Heritage.
