= Arthur Foxwell =

English physician

- Born: 13 July 1853; Shepton Mallet, England
- Died: 1 August 1909 (aged 56); Leamington, England
- Occupation: Physician

Arthur Foxwell (13 July 1853 – 1 August 1909) was an English physician.

== Biography ==
Foxwell was born at Shepton Mallet, Somerset, on 13 July 1853, was a younger son of Thomas Somerton Foxwell of Shepton Mallet and Weston-super-Mare by his second wife Jane, daughter of William Handcock of Jersey. His elder brother, Herbert Somerton Foxwell, was a professor of political economy in the University of London.

From Queen's College, Taunton, Arthur passed to St. John's College, Cambridge, graduating B.A. with honours in natural science in 1877, M.B. with first class in medicine in 1881, and proceeding M.A. and M.D. in 1891. Meanwhile, in 1873 he graduated B.A. at London with honours in English and moral science, and pursued his medical education at St. Thomas's Hospital, London. In 1881 he became M.R.C.S. London. He became a licentiate of the Royal College of Physicians, London, in 1881, a member in 1885, and a fellow in 1892. At the college in 1889 he read the Bradshawe lecture, which he published in 1899 under the title 'The Causation of Functional Murmurs,' in which he deduced from clinical and pathological experience of cases and elaborate experiments the conclusion that functional murmurs are caused by dilatation of the pulmonary artery immediately beyond the valve and are not due to change in the viscosity of the blood. During the winter of 1887-8 he studied at Vienna, chiefly diseases of the throat and ear.

After holding the posts of house physician at St. Thomas's Hospital (1881), clinical assistant at the Brompton Hospital (1882), and junior resident medical officer at the Manchester Children's Hospital, Pendlebury (1882–3), he was elected as resident pathologist at the General Hospital, Birmingham (1884), and was honorary assistant physician there from 1885 to 1889. In 1889 he became honorary physician at the Queen's Hospital, Birmingham, where at his death he was senior honorary physician. At the hospital he was chiefly responsible for the construction of the roof ward, only partially covered in, and otherwise open to the air, in which considerable success was obtained in the treatment of various diseases apart from those of tuberculous nature. He was also for a time pathologist to the Birmingham Hospital for Women and demonstrator in medical pathology in the Queen's Faculty of Medicine (at Mason College), known as the Queen's College. From 1887 to 1901 he was honorary librarian at the Medical Institute, Birmingham, of which he was president at his death, and he edited for a time the 'Birmingham Medical Review' (1886–8). In 1906 he was appointed professor of therapeutics in the new Birmingham University and received the degree of M.Sc.

Of shy and reserved nature and weak health, Foxwell died, from the result of a bicycle accident, in the Wanieford Hospital, Leamington, on 1 August 1909, and was buried in the burial ground of the Franciscans at Olton. He married in 1889 Lisette, daughter of Charles Hollins of Torquay and widow of Robert Pollock of Birmingham. He left one daughter. A memorial tablet designed by his stepson, Mr. Courtenay Pollock, was placed in the Queen's Hospital, Birmingham, and an annual prize for a clinical essay, open to qualified residents in the Queen's, General, and Children's Hospitals, Birmingham, endowed in his memory. Foxwell's chief publication, apart from the Bradshawe lecture, was 'Essays on Heart and Lung Disease' (1896), a collection of miscellaneous contributions to the 'Proceedings' of medical societies and similar pieces; papers on climate are included, as well as the Ingleby lectures on 'The Condition of the Vascular System in Anaemic Debility,' delivered at the Queen's College, Birmingham, 1892. He also published 'The Enlarged Cirrhotic Liver' (1896) and 'The Spas of Mid Wales' (1899).
