= Wedginald =

Livestreamed cheese

Wedginald was a 20-kilogram (44 lb) wheel of English cheddar cheese made famous in 2007 when its producers livestreamed its maturation process. The livestream went viral, receiving international attention. Following the broadcast, the cheese was auctioned to raise money for the UK charity Children in Need.

== Cheese ==
Wedginald, a 20-kilogram (44 lb) wheel of cheddar cheese, was produced by Westcountry Farmhouse Cheesemakers of Westcombe Dairy, Evercreech, near Shepton Mallet in Somerset, England. The company set up a website, Cheddarvision, that livestreamed the cheese's maturation. The cheese's name was chosen after the site hosted a naming contest; it is a portmanteau of wedge and the given name Reginald.

== Livestream ==
Initially only an internet phenomenon of limited scope, the website soon received attention from major UK media outlets including the BBC, The Times, and The Independent. Wedginald also drew global attention with coverage in Norway and The Tony Kornheiser Radio Show in the United States.

More than 1.5 million people watched the stream of the 9-month maturation. A time-lapse video on YouTube attracted several hundred thousand page views, and a profile for the cheese gained over 1,300 friends on MySpace.

The cheese's creator, Tom Calver, stated that the company never expected Wedginald to go viral. He insisted that broadcasting Wedginald's maturation was to educate on the art of cheesemaking and to highlight the effort that goes into the production of gourmet food at a time when there is increasing detachment between consumers and producers.

== Maturation ==
On 19 September 2007, nine months into the cheese's maturation, Calver took the first sample to determine its quality and suitability for human consumption. Calver described the cheese as having "a caramel nose, a sweet twiggy greenness and a creamy good length of flavour... lemony, with a certain 'spritziness'".

On 19 November, Wedginald was sold in an online auction on eBay for £1,145, with the proceeds going to the charity Children in Need. The winner was a former resident of the Somerset village of Chew Magna, who had migrated to New Zealand as an architect and became involved in the wine industry. Wedginald remained online for viewing on the official website until 19 December 2007, after which it was exported to New Zealand on 22 December 2007.
