= Market Cross, Shepton Mallet =

Market Cross
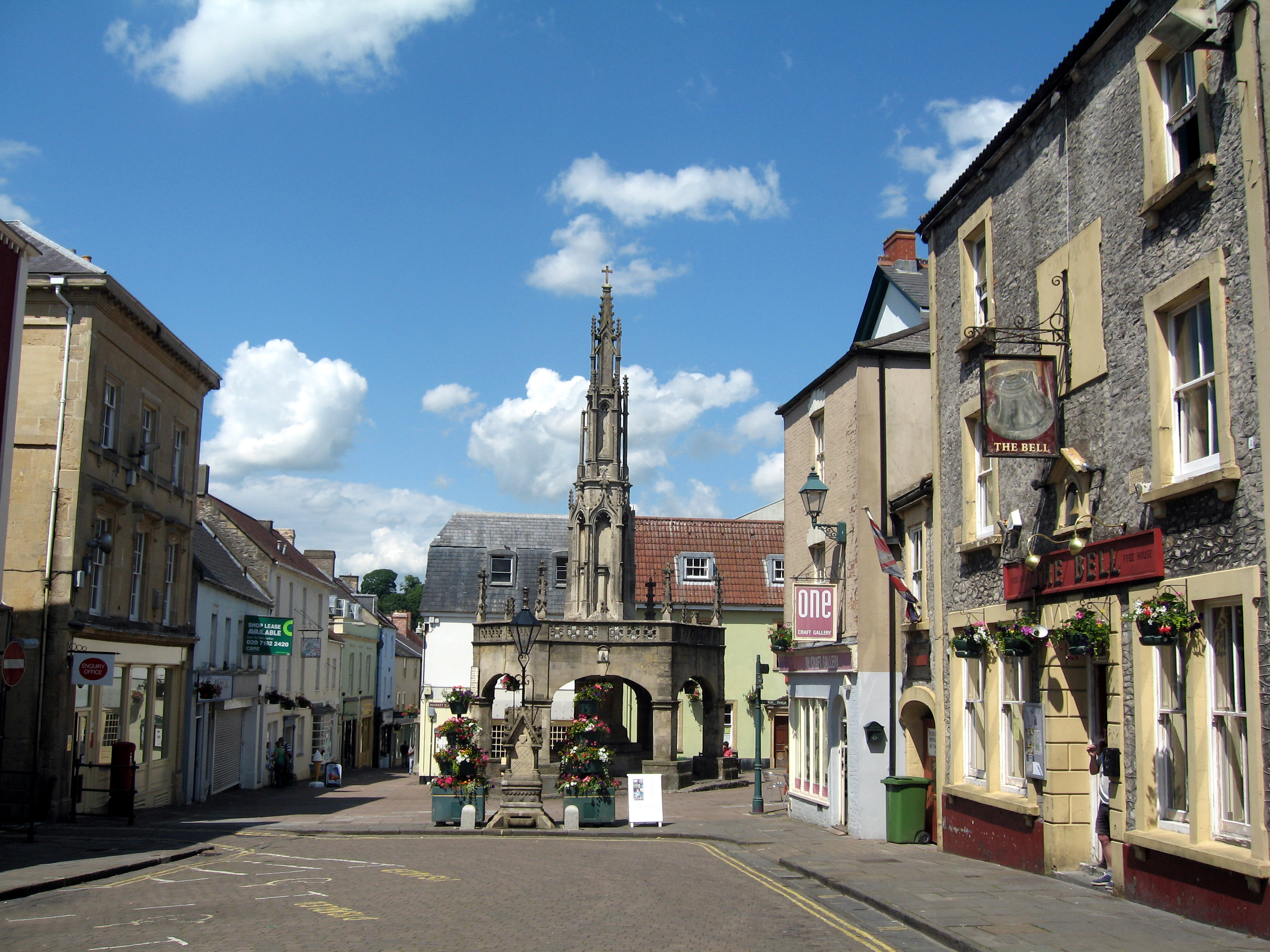

- Location within Somerset
- 51.1908°N 2.5467°W
- Location: Shepton Mallet, Somerset, England

History
- Built: c. 1500 rebuilt 1841

Listed Building – Grade II*
- Official name: Market Cross
- Designated: 20 May 1952
- Reference no.: 1058383

The Market Cross in Shepton Mallet, Somerset, England was built around 1500 and rebuilt in 1841. It is a Grade II* listed building, and has been scheduled as an ancient monument.

== History ==
The first market cross on the site in the centre of Shepton Mallet by 1500. A plaque says this was funded at a cost of £20 by Walter Buckland and his wife Agnes.

In 1685 following the Monmouth Rebellion 12 of the followers of James Scott, 1st Duke of Monmouth were hanged, drawn and quartered at the market cross.

In 1841 the market cross was rebuilt by George Phillips Manners.

In 2012 the lead on the roof and surrounding stonework was restored.

== Architecture ==
The 50 ft (15 m) tall hexagonal structure is built of Doulting stone. It has a central pier surrounded by six arches forming an arcade. The roof has a central spirelet. There is a parapet with crocketed finials above the arches.
