= Edmund Adams =

English cricketer

Personal information
- Full name: Edmund Joe Adams
- Born: 1 February 1915; Shepton Mallet, Somerset, England
- Died: 1 March 2005 (aged 90); Kingston-upon-Thames, Surrey, England

Domestic team information
- Years: Team
- 1935: Somerset
- Only FC: 20 July 1935 Somerset v Essex

Career statistics
Competition	First-class
Matches	1
Runs scored	5
Batting average	5.00
100s/50s	0/0
Top score	5
Catches/stumpings	0/–
- Source: CricketArchive, 30 March 2010

Edmund Joe Adams (1 February 1915 – 1 March 2005) was an English cricketer who played one first-class match for Somerset in July 1935. Adams was born in Shepton Mallet and died in Kingston upon Thames. A book published in 2017 gave his date of death as 24 March 2005.

Adams batted in just one innings of the match against Essex at Clacton. He scored five coming in fifth in the batting order in the first innings, but when Somerset captain Reggie Ingle rejigged the order to make swift runs for a declaration in the second innings, Adams did not bat. Ingle's tactics were justified with a 150-run victory.

== Life and career ==
Adams was the son of a stonemason and a schoolmistress, and the family relocated from Somerset to Wandsworth in London, where he played club cricket with Roehampton Cricket Club and the Club Cricket Conference, though he remained a supporter of Somerset. By career, he was a travelling salesman, though he also acted temporarily as a groundsman at Cheltenham after war service.
