= Fosse Way Magazine =

British newspaper

- Type: Weekly newspaper
- Format: Magazine
- Publisher: Blackmore Vale Media Ltd
- Editor: Fanny Charles
- Founded: ?
- Language: English
- Ceased publication: April 2011
- Headquarters: Street, Somerset
- Circulation: ?
- Price: Free
- Website: http://www.fosse-way.co.uk

The Fosse Way Magazine was a weekly magazine-size newspaper, distributed free of charge in the Mendip and South Somerset areas of Somerset, England. Its masthead stated that it covers Bruton, Castle Cary, Frome, Glastonbury, Langport, Shepton Mallet, Somerton, Street and Wells.

It was the sister paper of the Blackmore Vale Magazine which operates in Dorset, and the Stour and Avon Magazine. The three papers are published by Blackmore Vale Media Ltd, which is part of Northcliffe Media, itself a member of the Daily Mail and General Trust Group. Whilst Blackmore Vale Media operates from Stalbridge in Dorset, the Fosse Way Magazine had an office in Street in Somerset.

The Fosse Way Magazine ceased publication in April 2011, although the sister publications continue to be published.
