= Norah Fry =

Advocate and campaigner for disabled children, local politician (1871–1960)

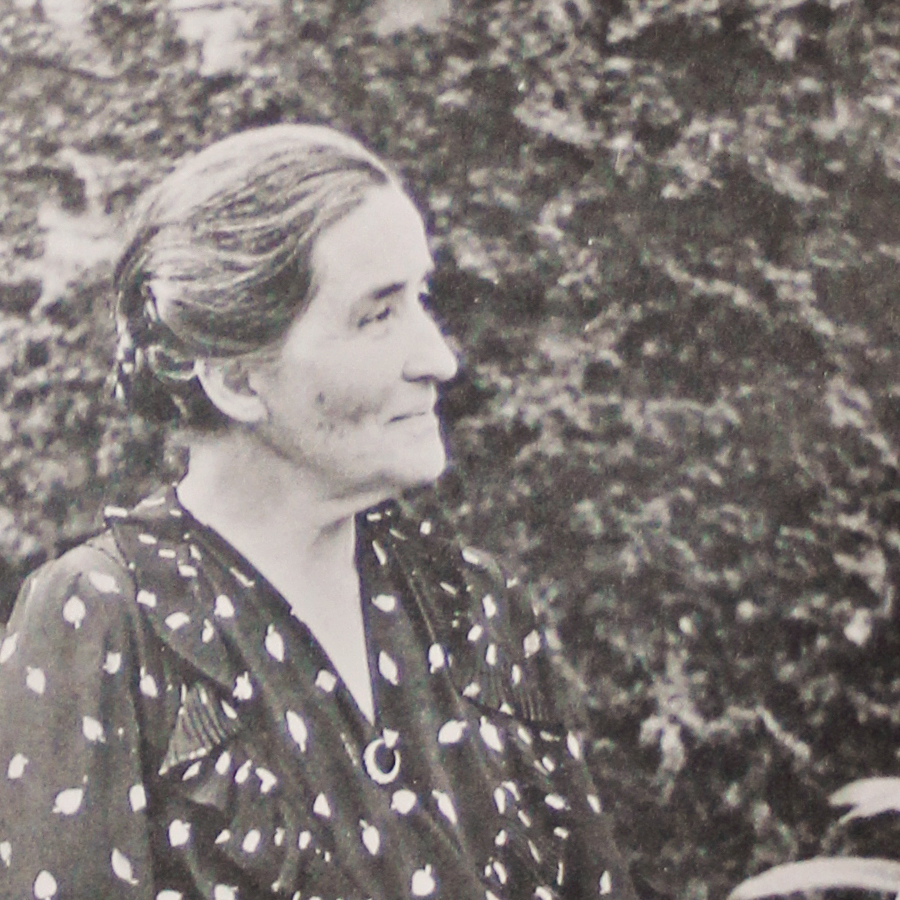
- Born: 1871; Bristol
- Died: 1960

Norah Lillian Fry (1871–1960) was a member of a Bristol Quaker Fry family of the J. S. Fry & Sons company. She was an advocate and campaigner for disabled children and those with learning difficulties and in 1918 became the first female councillor in Somerset.

== Life ==
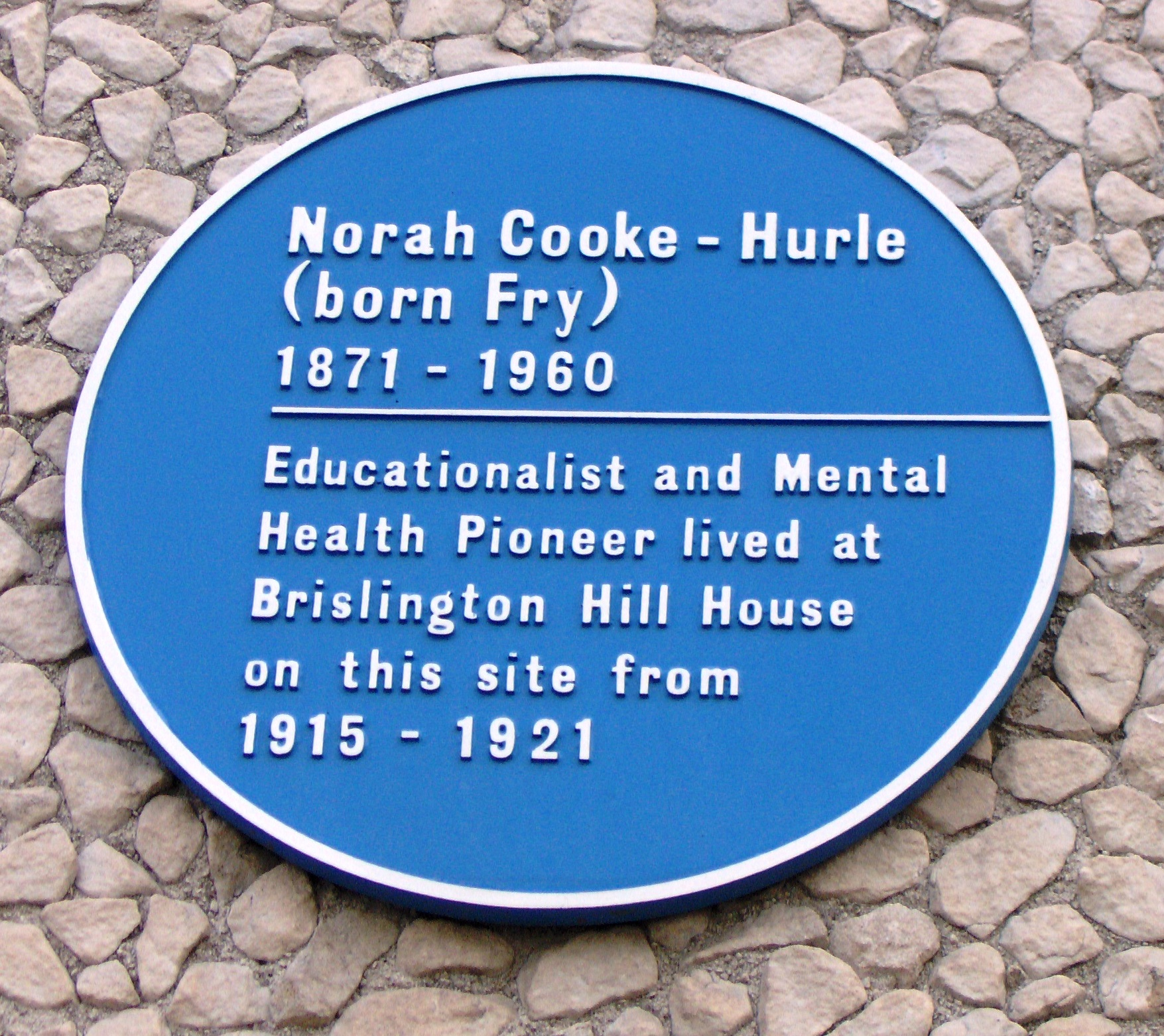
Blue Plaque in Brislington

Norah Fry was born and educated in Clifton, Bristol, one of the daughters of Francis James Fry and a relative of Joseph Storrs Fry. She later became Norah Lillian Cooke-Hurle after her marriage to Joseph Cooke-Hurle in 1915. She was an advocate for better services for people with learning difficulties. She was very concerned about the lack of proper schools for disabled children and the shortage of housing for people with learning difficulties.

She served as the chair of the statutory mental deficiency committee and a key member of the Somerset Association for Mental Welfare (SAMW).

The Norah Fry Research Centre in the University of Bristol is named after her, as was a hospital in Shepton Mallet.
