= Meathouse (disambiguation) =

Meathouse is a term for an outbuilding which preserves meat cured with salt, while if meat is cured by smoke would be called a smokehouse.

It may also refer to:

- Meathouse, Kentucky, an unincorporated community in the United States
- Meathouse Fork, a river in West Virginia, United States
- Meat market, a marketplace where meat is sold
- Butcher shop, a specialized store preparing meat for sale

== See also ==
- Meat market (disambiguation)
- Meat (disambiguation)
