= Shambles =

Shambles is an obsolete term for an open-air slaughterhouse and meat market.

Shambles or The Shambles may also refer to:

- The Shambles, a historic street in York, England
- The Shambles, Chesterfield, a historic street in Derbyshire, England
- The Shambles, Malton, a historic street in North Yorkshire, England
- The Shambles, Settle, a market hall in North Yorkshire, England
- Shambles, a reconstruction of butcher's market stalls in Shepton Mallet, England
- Shambles Square, Manchester, England
- Shambles Glacier, Adelaide Island, Antarctica
- The Shambles (band), an American power pop and rock band
- "Shambles", 2023 song by Band-Maid from Epic Narratives
- Shambles (film) (French: Maudite poutine), 2016 Canadian film directed by Karl Lemieux
- The Shambles, a street in the lower part of Totnes, Devon (England)
- The Shambles, a dangerous sandbank off Portland Bill, Dorset (England)
- Fishamble Street, a historic street in Dublin, Ireland
