= Meat market (disambiguation) =

A meat market is a marketplace where meat is sold.

Meat market may also refer to:

== Metaphor ==
- Meet market (also written meat market) a location or activity in which people are viewed as commodities or where people typically look for a casual sex partner

== Media ==
- Meat Market (film), 2000 Canadian horror film directed and written by Brian Clement
- Meat Market: Female Flesh Under Capitalism, a 2011 feminist book by British writer Laurie Penny
- "Meat Market", an episode in the American TV series Cupid
- Meat Market, a 2019 novel by British author Juno Dawson.
- Meat Market (EP), a 1992 release by Battery

== Markets for meat ==
- Meat packing industry, industry that slaughters, processes, packages, and distributes animals carcasses
- Mercado de las Carnes, the historic meat market in Ponce, Puerto Rico
- Metropolitan Meat Market, primarily known as the Meat Market, Melbourne, Australia

== See also ==
- Meet Market (disambiguation)
- Butcher (disambiguation)
