= Meet Market =

A meet market is a location or activity in which people are viewed as commodities or where people typically look for a casual sex partner.

Meet Market may refer to:

- Meet Market (film), a 2008 film
- "Meet Market", an episode from season 7 of CSI: Crime Scene Investigation
