= History of retail =

Historical development of sales to consumers

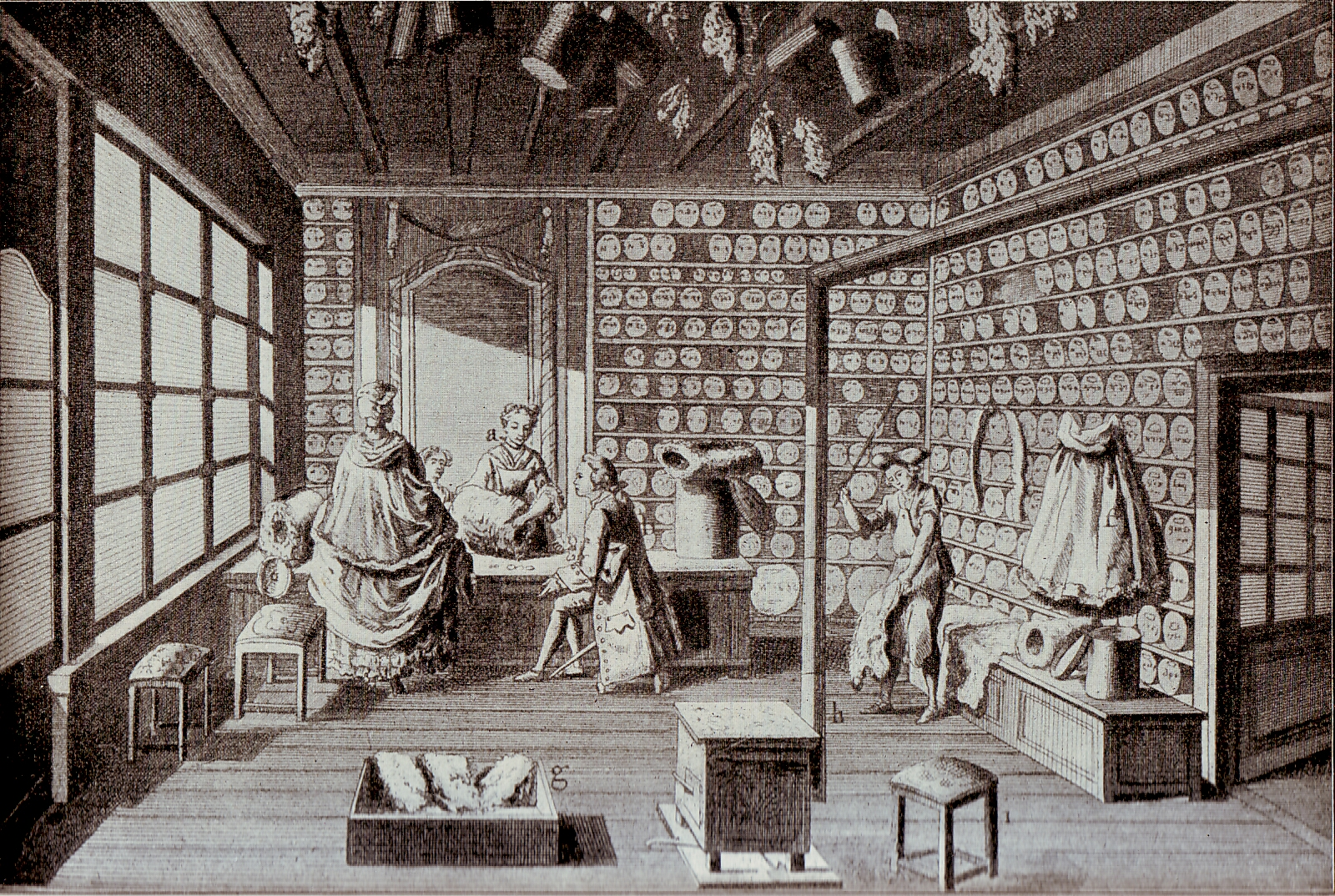
A furrier shop in Paris in 1765

The history of retail encompasses the sale of goods and services to consumers across all cultures and time periods from ancient history to the present.

Commerce first took the form of bargaining between early human civilizations. Beginning with Middle Eastern towns in the 7th millennium BCE, retail markets emerged when civilizations created money to facilitate commerce. Various ancient civilizations in the Middle East and Europe established open-air markets for merchants and producers to sell their goods to consumers. The earliest known permanent retail centers, the forums, were created in ancient Rome. Similar shopping centers were thought to have been created in China. By the first millennium BCE, Chinese retail was extensive and included branding and packaging.

In medieval Europe, consumers no longer purchased from fixed stores and instead went straight to the tradespeople's workshops. Markets or street vendors were used to sell perishable goods. The first commercial district in Europe, Chester Rows, was established in England in the thirteenth century. At this time, stores were typically no bigger than booths, and merchants kept goods out of sight until they were sold. Depending on its size, a European town or city had daily or weekly markets and fairs. Early modern Europe saw the rise of permanent stores with set hours as the predominant form of retail. More stores sold general goods rather than specializing in particular goods. Stores also grew in size which enabled customers to browse inside. The rise of general merchants also separated wholesale from retail, and consumers returned to shopping in stores rather than in tradesmen workshops.

The Industrial Revolution and the emergence of the department store in the 19th century reformed modern retail. Early department stores functioned as cultural centres where consumers could congregate and seek entertainment. Mail order catalogues also became popular. In 1954, the first modern shopping mall, Northland Mall, opened in the United States. Shops increased in size significantly during the 20th century, with warehouse stores occupying vast areas and selling a large variety of goods. In the 21st century, online shopping has become popular and competes with traditional physical stores.

== Antiquity ==
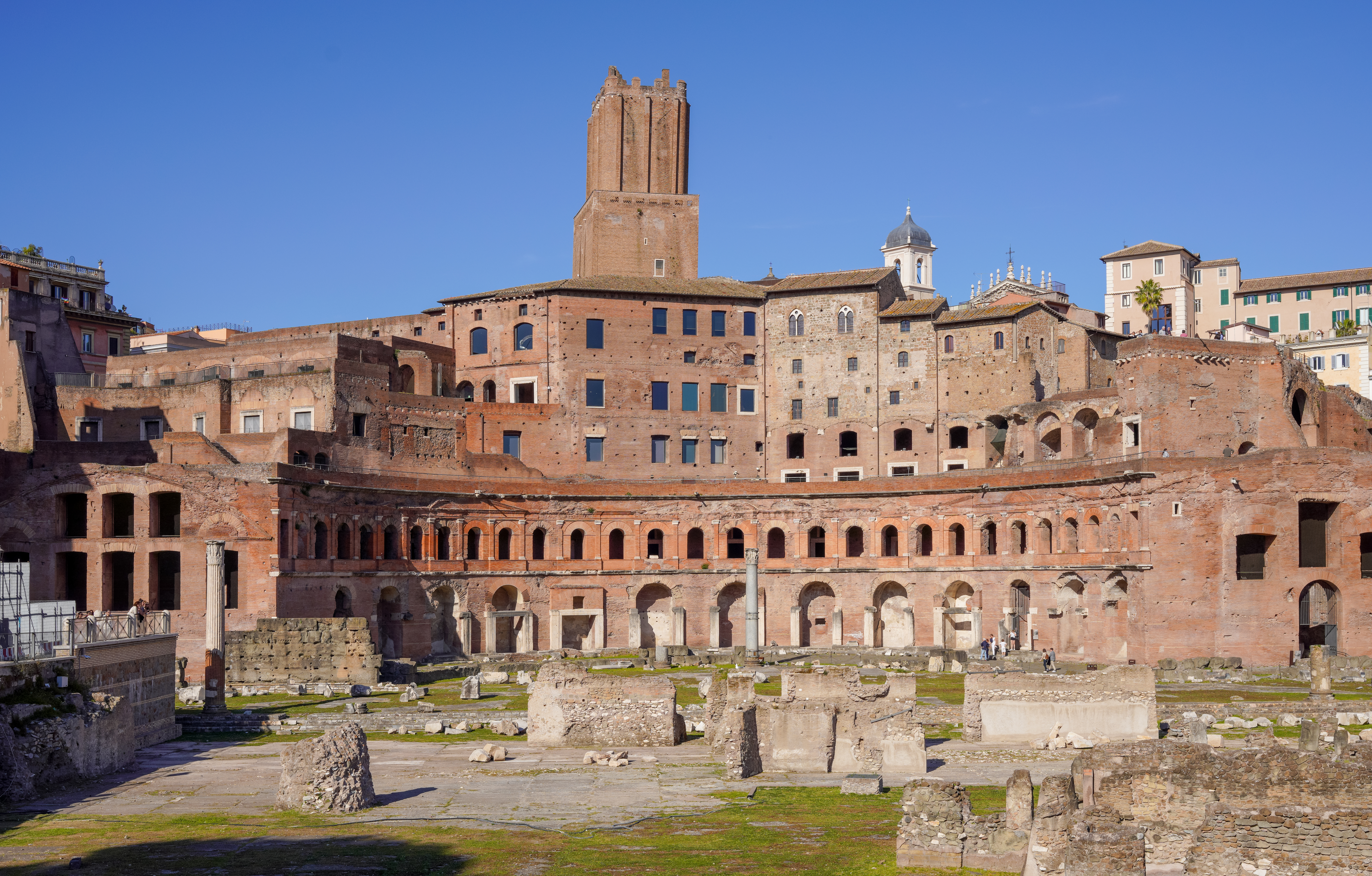
Marketplace at Trajan's Forum, the earliest known example of permanent retail shopfronts

Selling and buying supposedly emerged in Asia Minor (modern Turkey) around the 7th-millennium BCE. According to Herodotus, a Greek historian, retail trade, along with gold and silver coins, originated in Lydia. Gharipour points to evidence of primitive shops and trade centers in Sialk Hills in Kashan (6000 BCE), Catal Huyuk in modern-day Turkey (7,500–5,700 BCE), Jericho (2600 BCE) and Susa (4000 BCE).

Open-air, public markets were known in ancient Babylonia, Assyria, Phoenicia, and Egypt. These markets typically occupied a place in the town's center. Surrounding the market, skilled artisans, such as metalworkers, goldsmiths, and leather workers, occupied permanent premises in alleys that led to the open marketplace. These artisans may have sold wares directly from their premises, but also prepared goods for sale on market days. In ancient Greece, markets operated within the agora, an open space where goods were displayed on mats or temporary stalls on market days. In ancient Rome, trade took place in the forum. Rome had two forums: the Forum Romanum and Trajan's Forum. The latter was a vast expanse, comprising multiple buildings with shops on four levels. The Roman forum was arguably the earliest example of a permanent retail shop front. In antiquity, exchange involved direct selling via merchants or peddlers. Bartering systems were also commonplace.

The Phoenicians, noted for their seafaring skills, plied their ships across the Mediterranean and became a major trading power by the 9th century BCE. The Phoenicians imported and exported wood, textiles, glass, and produce such as wine, oil, dried fruit, and nuts. They also developed a network of colonies which spanned the Mediterranean coast and stretched from modern-day Crete through to Tangiers and onto Sardinia. In addition to commerce, the Phoenicians were also instrumental in cultural exchange. Their extensive trade networks necessitated considerable bookkeeping and correspondence. In around 1500 BCE, the Phoenicians developed a consonantal alphabet which was much easier to learn than the complex scripts used in ancient Egypt and Mesopotamia. Phoenician traders and merchants were largely responsible for spreading their alphabet around the region. Phoenician inscriptions have been found in archaeological sites at several former Phoenician cities and colonies around the Mediterranean, such as Byblos (in present-day Lebanon) and Carthage in North Africa.

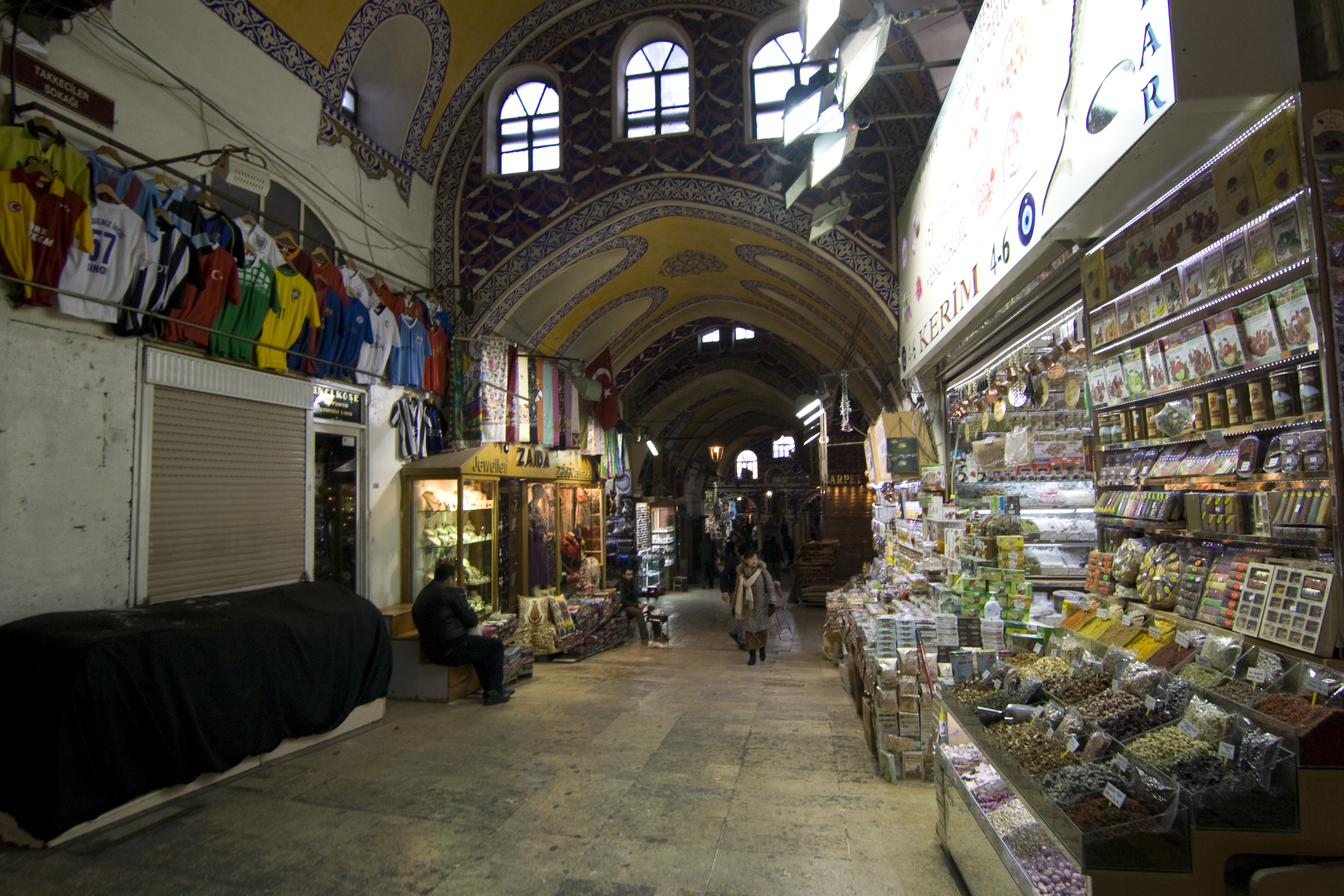
Grand Bazaar, Istanbul (interior). Established in 1455, it is thought to be the oldest continuously operating covered market.

In the Graeco-Roman world, markets primarily served the local peasantry and were also important centers of social life. Local producers, who were generally poor, would sell surplus from their farming activities, purchase minor farm equipment, and occasionally buy a few luxuries for their homes. Merchants often directly visited major producers such as the great estates. Very wealthy landowners managed their own distributions including imports and exports. The nature of export markets in antiquity is well documented in ancient sources and archaeological case studies. The Romans preferred to purchase goods from specific places: oysters from Londinium, and cinnamon from a specific mountain in Arabia. These location-based preferences stimulated trade throughout Europe and the Middle East.

While the rise of retailing and marketing in England and Europe has been extensively studied, less is known about developments elsewhere. Nevertheless, recent research suggests that China exhibited a rich history of early retail systems. From as early as 200 BCE, Chinese packaging and branding were used to signal family, place names, and product quality. Government-imposed product branding was also used between 600 and 900 CE. Eckhart and Bengtsson have argued that during the Song Dynasty (960–1127), Chinese society developed a consumerist culture, where a high level of consumption was attainable for both ordinary consumers and the elite. This rise in consumer culture also led to commercial investment in carefully managed company image, retail signage, symbolic brands, trademark protection and sophisticated brand concepts.

== Medieval Europe ==
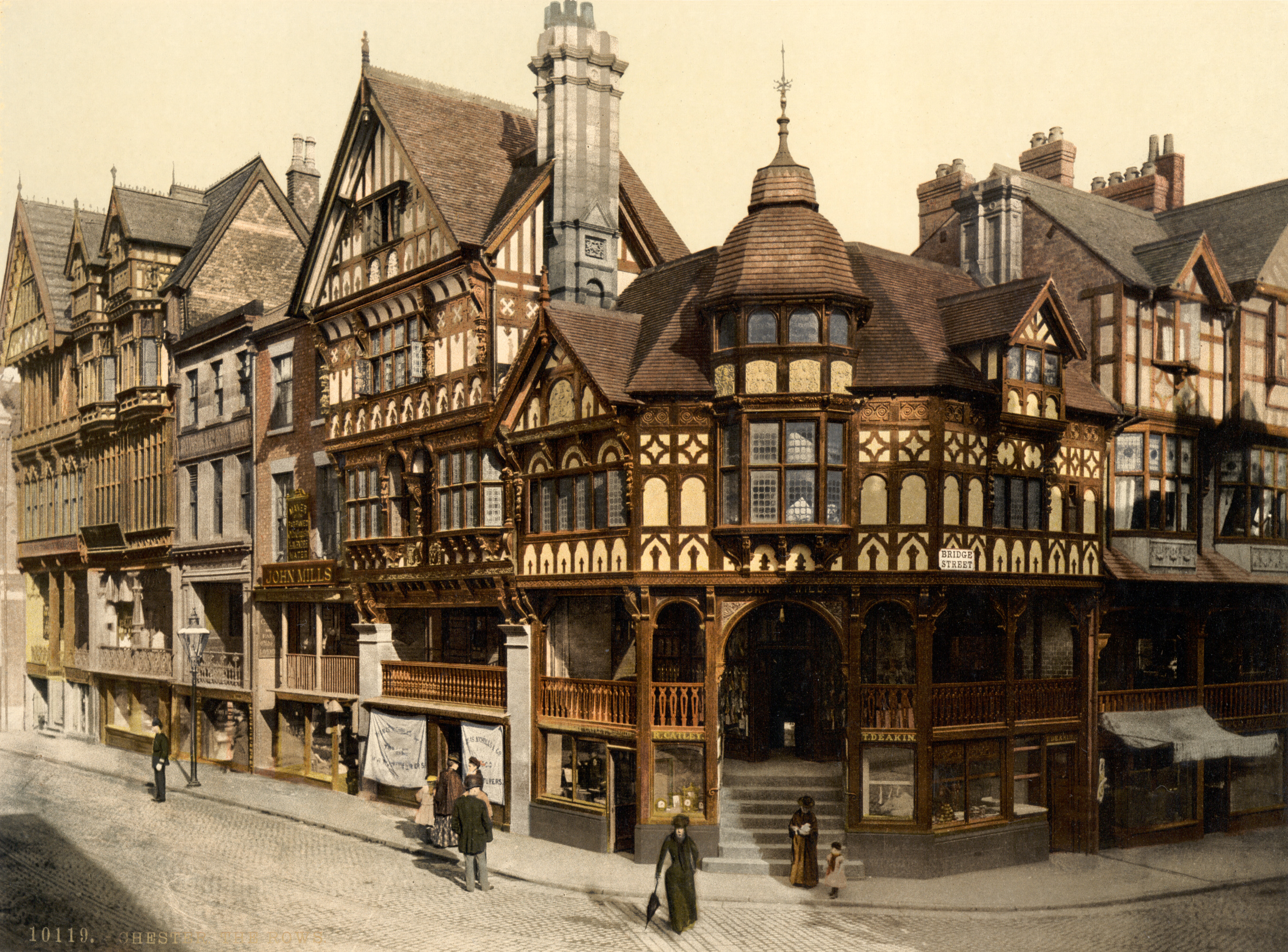
The Row, Chester, Cheshire, England, c. 1895; a unique medieval shopping arcade

In Medieval England and Europe, relatively few permanent shops existed. Instead, customers walked into the tradesman's workshops where they discussed purchasing options directly with tradesmen. In 13th-century London, mercers and haberdashers were known to exist and grocers sold "miscellaneous small wares as well as spices and medicines". Fish and other perishables were sold through markets, costermongers, hucksters, peddlers, or other types of itinerant vendor.

In the more populous cities, a small number of shops began to emerge by the 13th century. In Chester, a medieval covered shopping arcade represented a major innovation that attracted shoppers from many miles around. Known as "The Rows", this medieval shopping arcade is believed to be the first of its kind in Europe. Fragments of Chester's Medieval Row, which dates to the mid-13th century, can still be found in Cheshire. In the 13th or 14th century, another arcade with several shops was recorded at Drapery Row in Winchester. The emergence of street names such as Drapery Row, Mercer's Lane, and Ironmonger Lane in the medieval period suggests that permanent shops were becoming more commonplace.

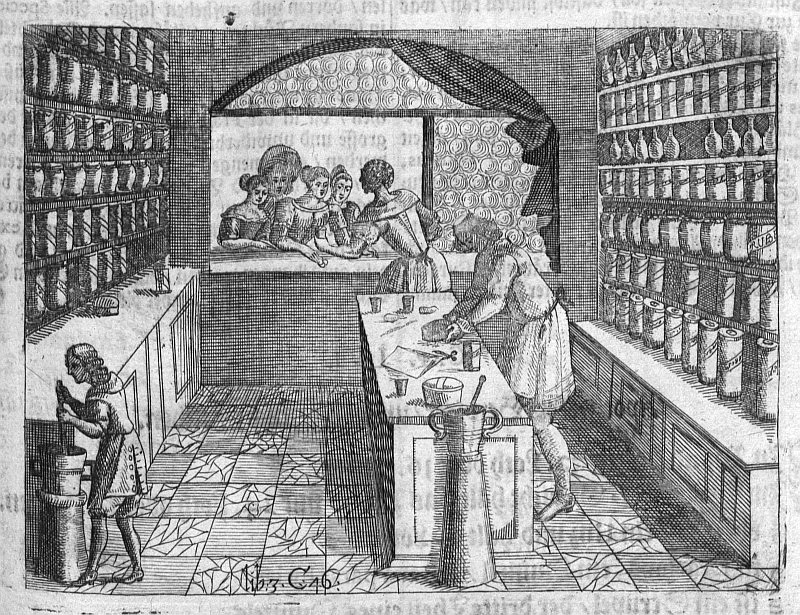
A typical 17th-century shop, with customers being served through an opening onto the street

Medieval shops had little in common with their modern equivalent. As late as the 16th century, London's shops were described as little more than "rude booths" and their owners "bawled as loudly as the itinerants." Shopfronts typically had a front door with two wider openings on either side, each covered with shutters. Cox and Dannehl suggest that the medieval shopper's experience was very different. Glazed windows were rare during the medieval period and did not become commonplace until the eighteenth century. This meant that shop interiors were dark places. Outside the markets, goods were rarely out on display and the service counter was unknown. Shoppers had relatively few opportunities to inspect the merchandise before consumption. Many stores had openings on the street from which they served customers.

More specialised purchases of artisan goods such as clothes, furniture, metalwork, decorative pottery, and art were often made by visiting the workshop where they were made, often first to discuss the objects and later to approve and collect them. Except at the lowest level, dressmakers typically visited the customer in their home for instructions or fittings.

Outside the major cities, most consumable purchases were made through markets or fairs. Markets were held daily in the more populous towns and cities or weekly in the more sparsely populated rural districts. Markets sold fresh produce such as fruit, vegetables, baked goods, meat, poultry, fish, and some ready-to-eat foodstuffs. In contrast, fairs operated on a periodic cycle and were almost always associated with a religious festival. Fairs sold non-perishables such as farm tools, homewares, furniture, rugs, and ceramics. Market towns dotted the medieval European landscape while itinerant vendors supplied less populated areas or hard-to-reach districts. Peddlers and other itinerant vendors operated alongside other types of retail for centuries. The political philosopher, John Stuart Mill compared the convenience of markets/fairs to that of itinerant peddlers:

The contrivance of fairs and markets was early had recourse to, where consumers and producers might periodically meet, without any intermediate agency; and this plan answers tolerably well for many articles, especially agricultural produce … but were inconvenient to buyers who have other occupations, and do not live in the immediate vicinity … and the wants of the consumers must either be provided for so long beforehand, or must remain so long unsupplied, that even before the resources of society admitted of the establishment of shops, the supply of these wants fell universally into the hands of itinerant dealers: the pedlar, who might appear once a month, being preferred to the fair, which only returned once or twice a year.

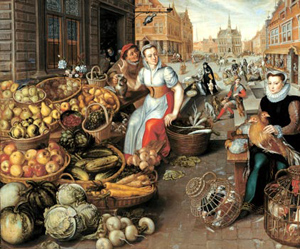
Fruit and Vegetable Market. Painting by Arnout de Muyser, c. 1590

Blintiff has investigated the early medieval networks of market towns across Europe and suggests that by the 12th century, there was an upsurge in the number of market towns. In addition, there was also an emergence of merchant circuits as traders bulked up surpluses from different smaller regional day markets and resold them at the larger centralized market towns. Marketplaces appear to have emerged independently outside Europe. With construction beginning in 1455, the Grand Bazaar in Istanbul is often cited as the world's oldest continuously operating market. The Spanish conquistadors wrote glowingly of markets in the Americas. In the 15th century, the Mexica (Aztec) market of Tlatelolco was the largest in all the Americas.

English market towns were regulated from a relatively early period. The English monarchs awarded a charter to local Lords to create markets and fairs for a town or village. This charter would grant the lords the right to take tolls and also afford some protection from rival markets. For example, once a chartered market was granted for specific market days, a nearby rival market could not open on the same days. Across the boroughs of England, a network of chartered markets sprang up between the 12th and 16th centuries and gave consumers reasonable choice in the markets they preferred to patronize. A study on the purchasing habits of the monks and other individuals in medieval England suggests that consumers of the period were relatively discerning. Consumers made purchasing decisions such as where to shop and which markets were superior based on criteria such as perceptions of the range, quality, and price of goods.

Braudel and Reynold have made a systematic study of these European market towns between the thirteenth and fifteenth centuries. Their investigation shows that markets were held once or twice a week in regional districts while daily markets were common in larger cities. Gradually over time, permanent shops with regular trading days began to supplant the periodic markets, while peddlers filled in the gaps in distribution. The physical market was characterized by transactional exchange and the economy was characterized by local trading. Braudel reports that, in 1600, goods traveled relatively short distances – grain 5–10 miles; cattle 40–70 miles; wool and woollen cloth 20–40 miles. Following the European age of discovery, goods were imported from afar – calico cloth from India, porcelain, silk, and tea from China, spices from India and Southeast Asia, and tobacco, sugar, rum, and coffee from the New World. In the 18th and 19th centuries, and particularly by the 1880s, these stores were plentiful throughout the United States. Many of these stores were drug stores or general stores selling everything from groceries and fabrics to toys and tools. People during this time were also expanding settlements across the country and creating new towns. It was not uncommon for each town to have a mom-and-pop store offering general merchandise that could be purchased for daily life.

The English essayist, Joseph Addison, writing in 1711, described the exotic origin of produce available to English society in the following terms:

Our Ships are laden with the Harvest of every Climate: Our Tables are stored with Spices, and Oils, and Wines: Our Rooms are filled with Pyramids of China and adorned with the Workmanship of Japan: Our Morning's Draught comes to us from the remotest Corners of the Earth: We repair our Bodies by the Drugs of America and repose ourselves under Indian Canopies. My Friend Sir ANDREW calls the Vineyards of France our Gardens; the Spice-Islands our Hot-beds; the Persians our Silk-Weavers, and the Chinese our Potters. Nature indeed furnishes us with the bare Necessaries of Life, but Traffick gives us greater Variety of what is Useful, and at the same time supplies us with everything that is Convenient and Ornamental.

Luca Clerici has made a detailed study of Vicenza’s food market during the sixteenth century. He found that there were many different types of resellers operating out of the markets. For example, in the dairy trade, cheese and butter were sold by the members of two craft guilds (i.e., cheesemongers who were shopkeepers) and of the so-called ‘resellers’ (hucksters selling a wide range of foodstuffs), and by other sellers who were not enrolled in any guild. Cheesemongers’ shops were situated in the town hall and were very lucrative. Resellers and direct sellers increased the number of sellers, thus increasing competition, to the benefit of consumers. Direct sellers, who brought produce from the surrounding countryside, sold their wares through the central marketplace and priced their goods at considerably lower rates than cheesemongers.

== 17th–19th centuries ==
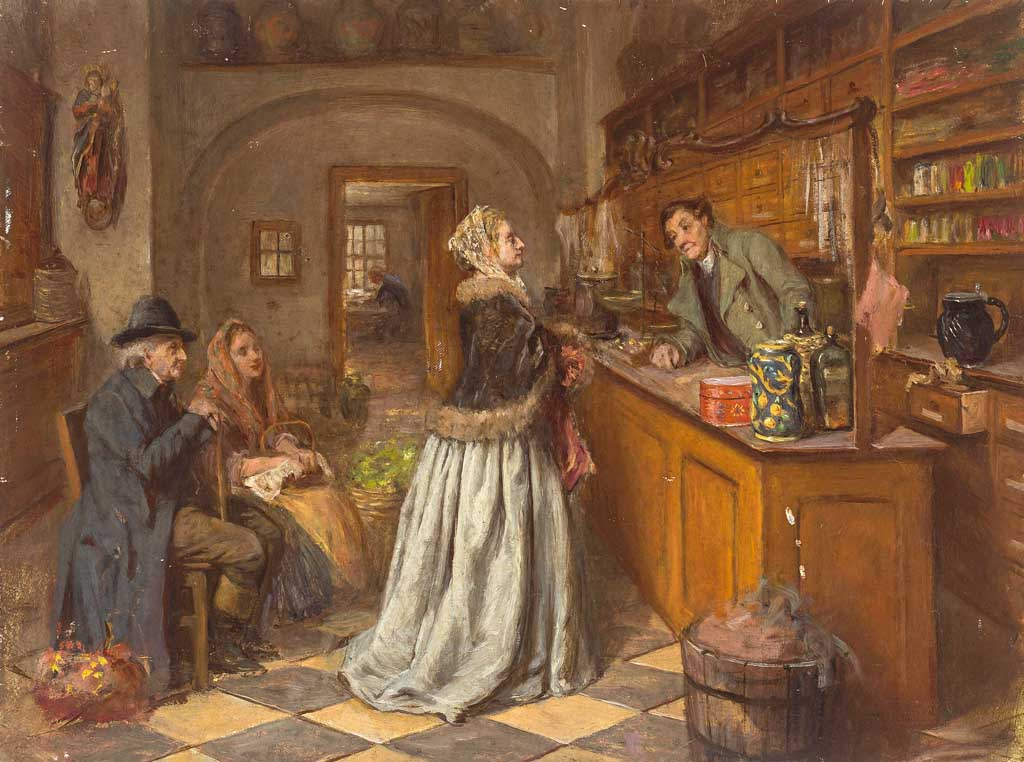
The retail service counter was an innovation of the eighteenth century.

By the 17th century, permanent shops with more regular trading hours were beginning to supplant markets and fairs as the main retail outlet. Provincial shopkeepers were active in almost every English market town. These shopkeepers sold general merchandise, much like a contemporary convenience store or a general store. For example, William Allen, a mercer in Tamworth who died in 1604, sold spices alongside furs and fabrics. William Stout of Lancaster retailed sugar, tobacco, nails, and prunes at both his shop and at the central markets. His autobiography reveals that he spent most of his time preparing products for sale at the central market, which brought an influx of customers into town.

As the number of shops grew, they also changed. The trappings of a modern shop, which had been absent from the sixteenth- and early seventeenth-century store, gradually made way for store interiors and shopfronts that are more familiar to modern shoppers. Before the eighteenth century, the typical retail store had no counter, display cases, chairs, mirrors, changing rooms, etc. However, the opportunity for the customer to browse merchandise, and touch and feel products began to be available, with retail innovations from the late 17th and early 18th centuries. For example, glazing was widely used from the early 18th century. English commentators pointed to the speed at which glazing was installed, Daniel Defoe, writing in 1726, noted that "Never was there such painting and gildings, such sashing's and looking-glasses as the shopkeepers as there is now."

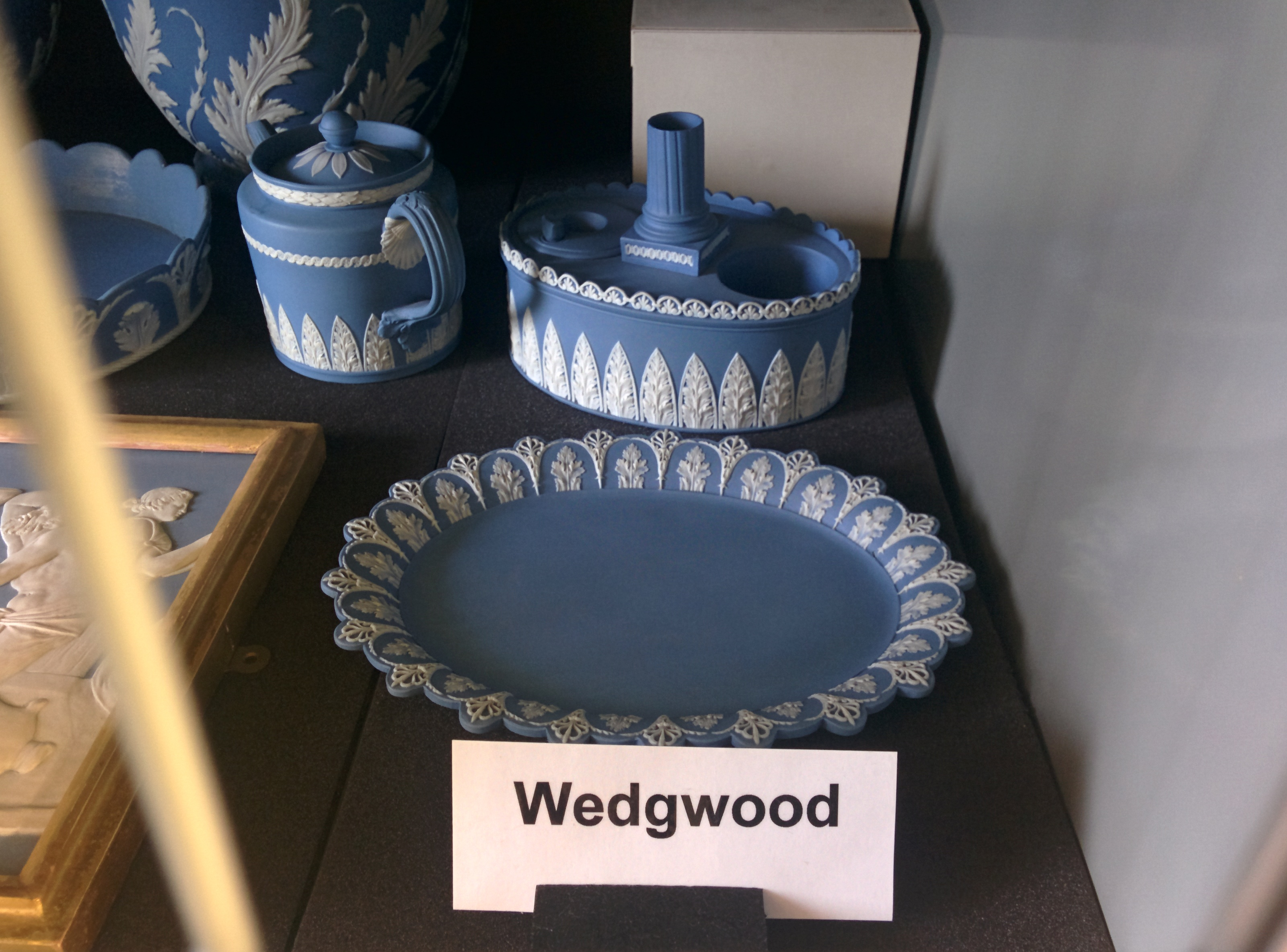
Josiah Wedgewood was one of the English entrepreneurs who held expansive displays in his private home or rented premises.

Outside the major metropolitan cities, few stores could afford to serve one type of clientele exclusively. However, gradually retail shops introduced innovations that would allow them to separate wealthier customers from the "riff-raff." One technique was to have a window opening out onto the street from which customers could be served. This allowed the sale of goods to the common people, without encouraging them to come inside. Another solution, that came into vogue from the late sixteenth century was to invite favored customers into a backroom of the store, where goods were permanently on display. Yet another technique that emerged around the same time was to hold a showcase of goods in the shopkeeper's private home for the benefit of wealthier clients. Samuel Pepys, for example, writing in 1660, describes being invited to the home of a retailer to view a wooden jack. The eighteenth-century English entrepreneurs, Josiah Wedgewood and Matthew Boulton, both staged expansive showcases of their wares in their private residences or rented halls.

Savitt has argued that by the eighteenth century, American merchants, who had been operating as importers and exporters, began specialising in wholesale or retail roles. They tended not to specialize in particular types of merchandise, often trading as general merchants, selling a diverse range of product types. These merchants were concentrated in the larger cities. They often provided high levels of credit financing for retail transactions.

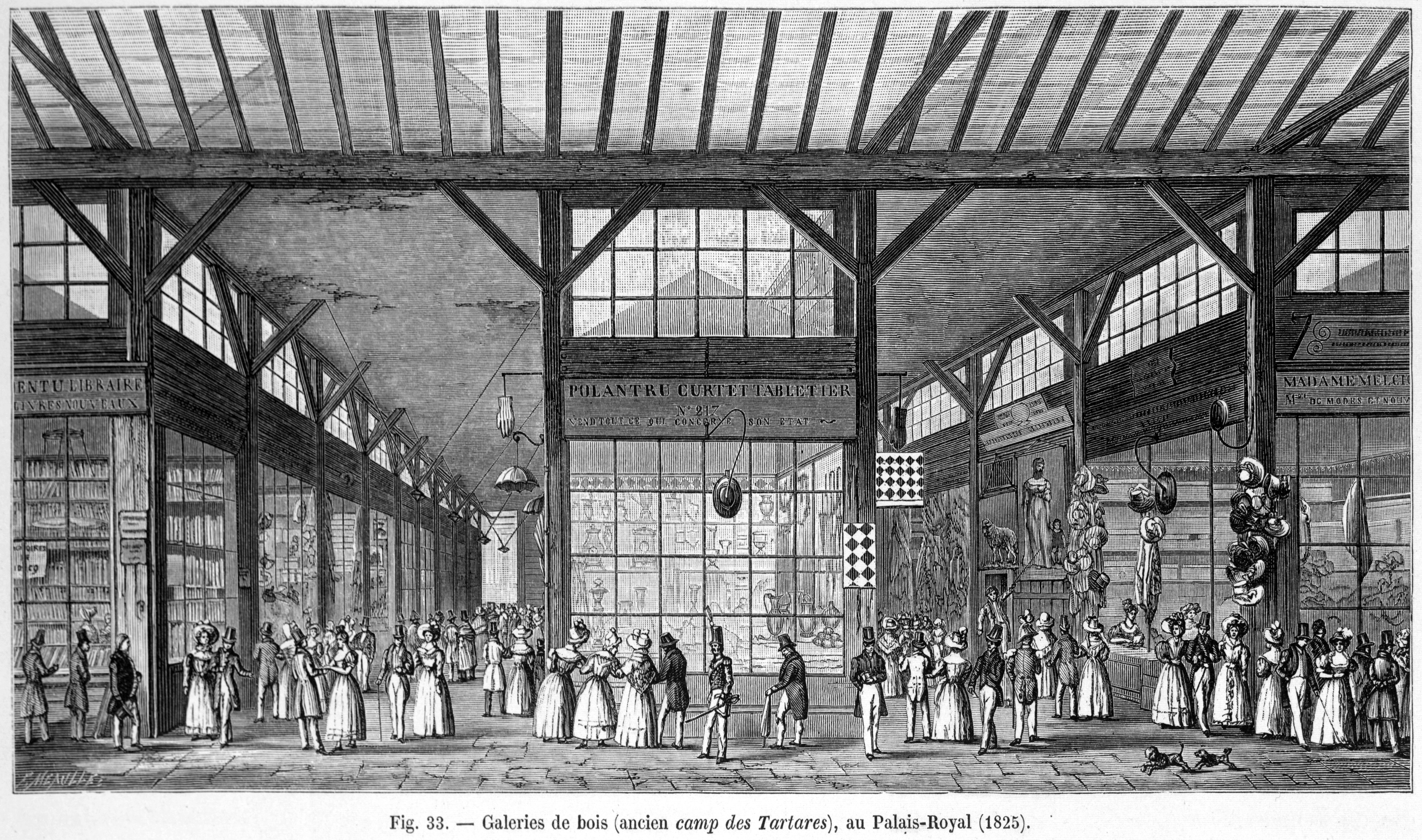
Galeries de bois at au Palais-Royal, one of the earliest shopping arcades in Europe

By the late eighteenth century, grand shopping arcades began to emerge across Europe and in the Antipodes. A shopping arcade refers to a multiple-vendor space, operating under a covered roof. Typically, the roof was constructed of glass to allow for natural light and to reduce the need for candles or electric lighting. Some of the earliest examples of shopping arcades appeared in Paris, due to its lack of pavement for pedestrians. Retailers, eager to attract window shoppers by providing a shopping environment away from the filthy streets, began to construct rudimentary arcades. Opening in 1771, the Coliseé, situated on the Champs-Élysées, consisted of three arcades, each with ten shops, all running off a central ballroom. For Parisians, the location was seen as too remote, and the arcade closed within two years of opening. Inspired by the souks of Arabia, the Galerie de bois, a series of wooden shops linked to the ends of the Palais Royal, opened in 1786 and became a central part of Parisian social life.

The architect, Bertrand Lemoine, described the period, 1786 to 1935, as l’Ère des passages couverts (the Arcade Era). Shopping arcades became popular in European capitals during the early 19th century. The Palais Royal in Paris, which opened in 1784, Passage de Feydeau in Paris, which opened in 1791, and Passage du Claire, which opened in 1799, were among the most famous shopping arcades that spread across the continent during this time. London's Piccadilly Arcade (opened in 1810); Paris's Passage Colbert (1826) and Milan's Galleria Vittorio Emanuele (1878). Designed to attract the genteel middle class, arcade retailers sold luxury goods at relatively high prices. However, prices were never a deterrent, as these new arcades came to be the place to shop and to be seen. Arcades offered shoppers the promise of an enclosed space away from the chaos that characterised the noisy, dirty streets; a warm, dry space away from the elements, and a safe haven where people could socialise and spend their leisure time. As thousands of glass- covered arcades spread across Europe, they became grander and more ornately decorated. By the mid-nineteenth century, they had become prominent centres of fashion and social life. Promenading in these arcades became a popular nineteenth-century pass-time for the emerging middle classes. The Illustrated Guide to Paris of 1852 summarized the appeal of arcades in the following description:

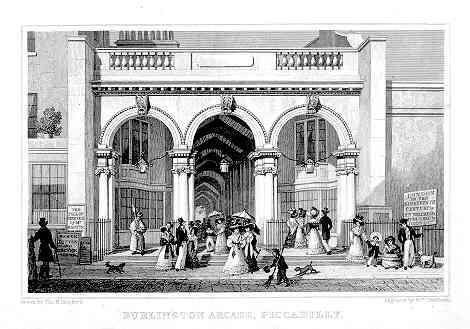
The Piccadilly entrance to the Burlington Arcade in 1827–28, shortly after its opening

"In speaking of the inner boulevards, we have made mention again and again of the arcades which open onto them. These arcades, a recent invention of industrial luxury, are glass-roofed, marble-paneled corridors extending through whole blocks of buildings, whose owners have joined together for such enterprises. Lining both sides of these corridors, which get their light from above, are the most elegant shops so that the arcade is a city, a world in miniature, in which customers will find everything they need."

The Palais-Royal, which opened to Parisians in 1784 and became one of the most important marketplaces in Paris, is generally regarded as the earliest example of the grand shopping arcade. The Palais-Royal was a complex of gardens, shops, and entertainment venues situated on the external perimeter of the grounds, under the original colonnades. The area boasted some 145 boutiques, cafés, salons, hair salons, bookshops, museums, and numerous refreshment kiosks as well as two theatres. The retail outlets specialised in luxury goods such as fine jewellery, furs, paintings, and furniture designed to appeal to the wealthy elite. Retailers operating out of the Palais complex were among the first in Europe to abandon the system of bartering and adopt fixed prices thereby sparing their clientele the hassle of bartering. Stores were fitted with long glass exterior windows which allowed the emerging middle-classes to window shop and indulge in fantasies, even when they may not have been able to afford the high retail prices. Thus, the Palais-Royal became one of the first examples of a new style of shopping arcade, frequented by both the aristocracy and the middle classes. It developed a reputation as being a site of sophisticated conversation, revolving around the salons, cafés, and bookshops, but also became a place frequented by off-duty soldiers and was a favourite haunt of prostitutes, many of whom rented apartments in the building. London's Burlington Arcade, which opened in 1819, positioned itself as an elegant and exclusive venue from the outset. Other notable nineteenth-century grand arcades include the Galeries Royales Saint-Hubert in Brussels, which was inaugurated in 1847, Istanbul's Çiçek Pasajı opened in 1870 and Milan's Galleria Vittorio Emanuele II first opened in 1877. Shopping arcades were the precursor to the modern shopping mall.

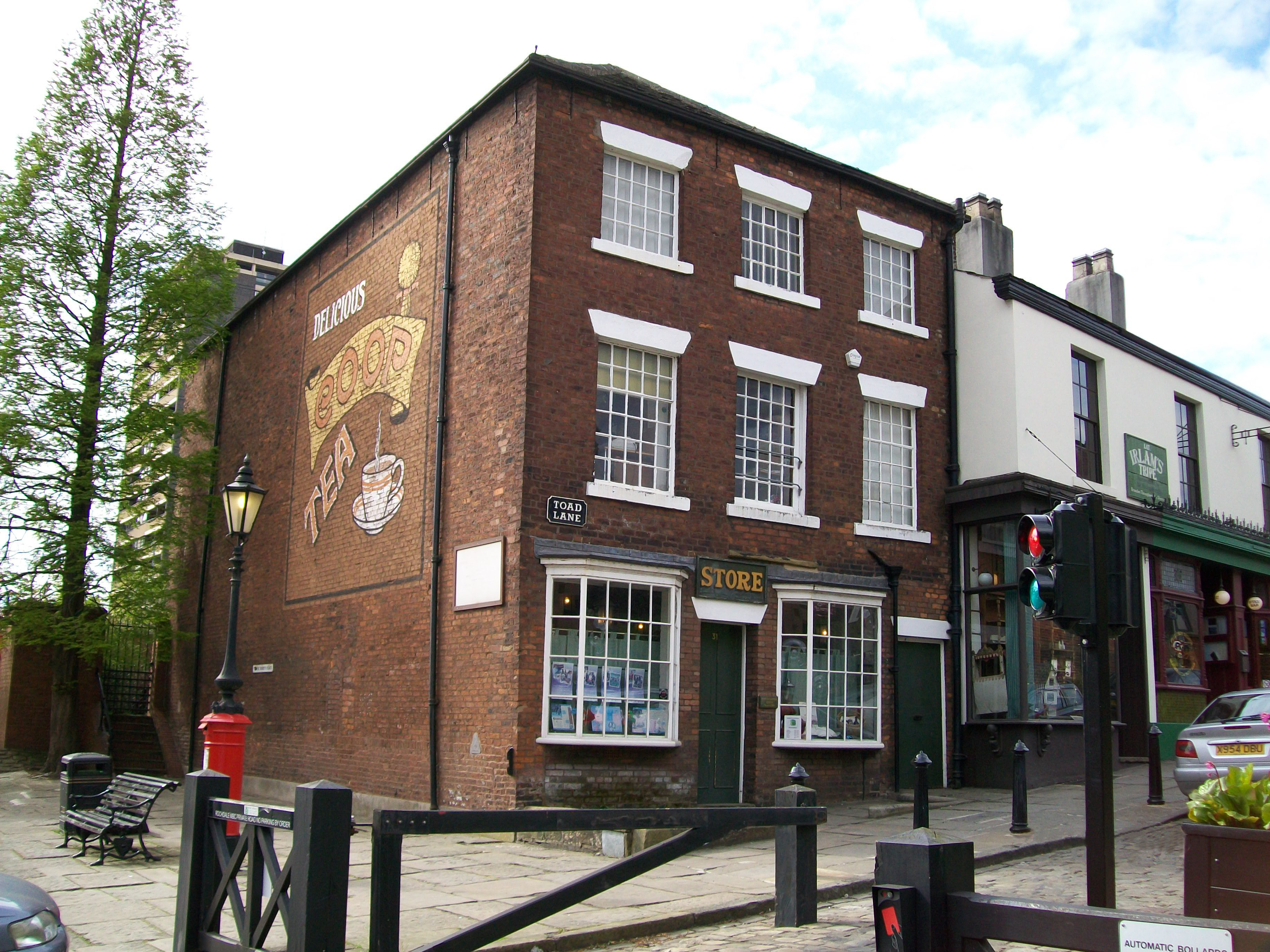
The original Toad Lane Store, Rochdale, Manchester; one of Britain's earliest co-operative stores

While the arcades were the province of the bourgeoisie, a new type of retail venture emerged to serve the needs of the working poor. John Stuart Mill wrote about the rise of the cooperative retail store, which he witnessed first-hand in the mid-nineteenth century. Stuart Mill locates these cooperative stores within a broader cooperative movement which was prominent in the industrial city of Manchester and the counties of Yorkshire and Lancashire. He documents one of the early co-operative retail stores in Rochdale in Manchester, England, "In 1853, the Store purchased for £745, a warehouse (freehold) on the opposite side of the street, where they keep and retail their stores of flour, butcher's meat, potatoes, and kindred articles." Stuart Mill also quoted a contemporary commentator who wrote of the benefits of the cooperative store:

Buyer and seller meet as friends; there is no overreaching on one side, and no suspicion on the other... These crowds of humble working men, who never knew before when they put good food in their mouths, whose every dinner was adulterated, whose shoes let in the water a month too soon, whose waistcoats shone with devil's dust, and whose wives wore calico that would not wash, now buy in the markets like millionaires, and as far as pureness of food goes, live like lords.

== Modern era ==
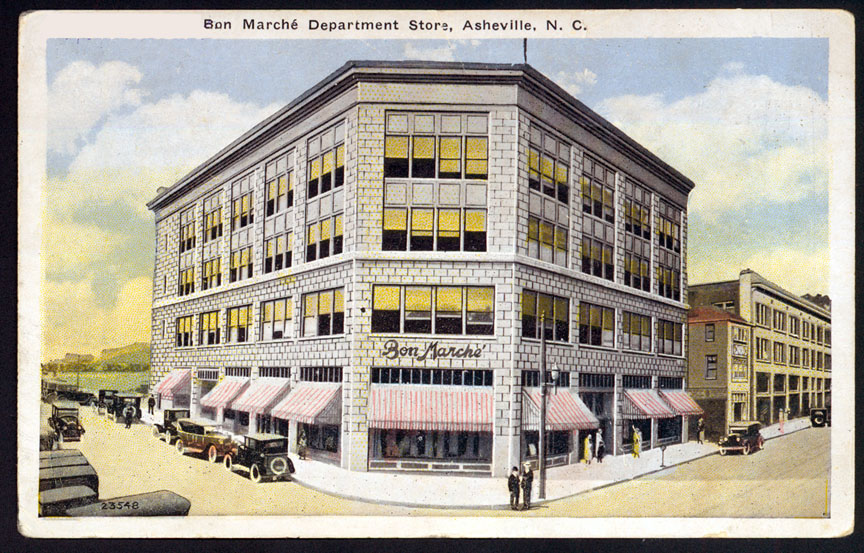
Department stores, such as Le Bon Marché of France, appeared in the mid-nineteenth century

The modern era of retailing is defined as the period from the Industrial Revolution to the 21st century. In major cities, the department store emerged in the mid-to-late 19th century, permanently reshaped shopping habits, and redefined concepts of service and luxury. The term, "department store" originated in America. In 19th-century England, these stores were known as emporia or warehouse shops. In London, the first department stores appeared in Oxford Street and Regent Street, where they formed part of a distinctly modern shopping precinct. When London draper, William Whiteley attempted to transform his Bayswater drapery store into a department store by adding a meat and vegetable department and an Oriental Department in around 1875, he met with extreme resistance from other shopkeepers, who resented that he was encroaching on their territory and poaching their customers. Before long, however, major department stores began to open across the US, Britain, Europe, Australia, and New Zealand from the mid-nineteenth century, including Harrods of London in 1834; Kendall's in Manchester in 1836; Selfridges of London in 1909; Macy's of New York in 1858; Bloomingdale's in 1861; Sak's in 1867; Sears in 1893; Nordstrom in 1901; JCPenney in 1902; Le Bon Marché of France in 1852; Galeries Lafayette of France in 1905; David Jones in 1838; Harris Scarfe in 1849; Myer in 1900; Harrolds in 1985; H & J Smith in 1900; and Farmers in 1909. Other twentieth-century innovations in retailing included chain stores, mail-order, multi-level marketing (pyramid selling or network marketing, c. 1920s), party plans (c. 1930s), and B2C e-commerce.

Many of the early department stores were more than just a retail emporium; rather they were venues where shoppers could spend their leisure time and be entertained. Some department stores offered reading rooms, art galleries, and concerts. Most department stores had tea rooms or dining rooms and offered treatment areas where ladies could indulge in a manicure. The fashion show, which originated in the US in around 1907, became a staple feature event for many department stores, and celebrity appearances were also used to great effect. Themed events featured wares from foreign shores, exposing shoppers to the exotic cultures of the Orient and Middle East. One such market that used themed events was the Dayton Arcade. Its opening day celebrations in 1904 used themed stalls to introduce shoppers to goods from around the world.

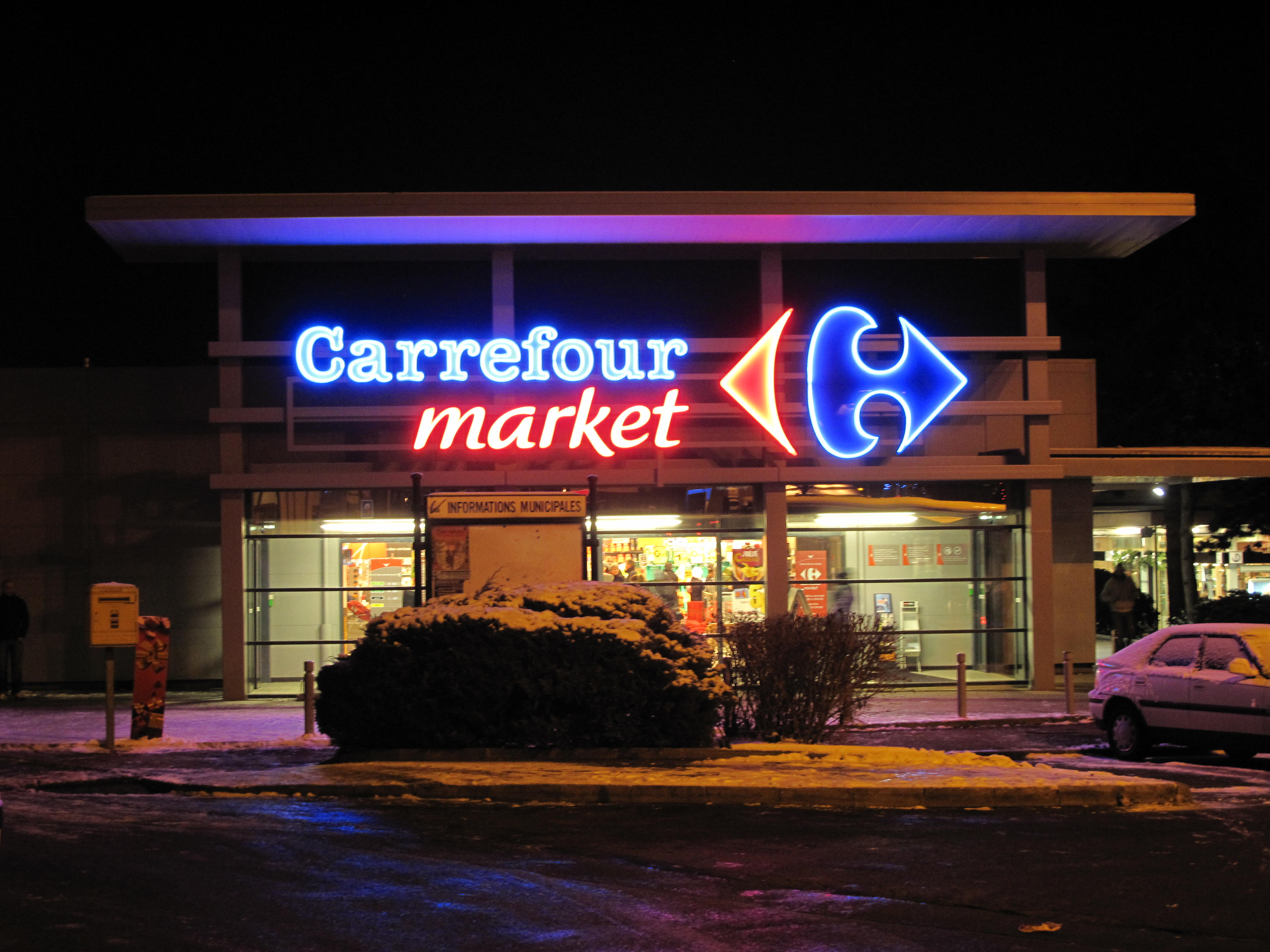
In 1963, Carrefour opened the first hypermarket in St Genevieve-de-Bois, near Paris.

During this period, retailers worked to develop modern retail marketing practices. Pioneering merchants who contributed to modern retail marketing and management methods include A. T. Stewart, Potter Palmer, John Wanamaker, Montgomery Ward, Marshall Field, Richard Warren Sears, Rowland Macy, James Cash Penney, Fred Lazarus, brothers Edward and William Filene and Sam Walton.

Retail, using mail order, came of age during the mid-19th century. Although catalogue sales had been used since the 15th century, this method of retailing was confined to a few industries such as the sale of books and seeds. However, improvements in transport and postal services led several entrepreneurs on both sides of the Atlantic to experiment with catalogue sales. In 1861, Welsh draper Pryce Pryce-Jones sent catalogues to clients who could place orders for flannel clothing which was then despatched by post. This enabled Pryce-Jones to extend his client base across Europe. A decade later, the US retailer, Montgomery Ward also devised a catalogue sales and mail-order system. His first catalogue which was issued in August 1872 consisted of an 8 in × 12 in (20 cm × 30 cm) single-sheet price list, listing 163 items for sale with ordering instructions for which Ward had written the copy. He also devised the catchphrase "satisfaction guaranteed or your money back" which was implemented in 1875. By the 1890s, Sears and Roebuck were also using mail order with great success.

Edward Filene, a proponent of the scientific approach to retail management, developed the concept of the automatic bargain Basement. Although Filene's basement was not the first ‘bargain basement’ in the U.S., the principles of ‘automatic mark-downs’ generated excitement and proved very profitable. Under Filene's plan, merchandise had to be sold within 30 days or it was marked down; after a further 12 days, the merchandise was further reduced by 25% and if still unsold after another 18 days, a further markdown of 25% was applied. If the merchandise remained unsold after two months, it was given to charity. Filene was a pioneer in employee relations. He instituted a profit-sharing program, a minimum wage for women, a 40-hour work week, health clinics, and paid vacations. He also played an important role in encouraging the Filene Cooperative Association, "perhaps the earliest American company union". Through this channel, he engaged constructively with his employees in collective bargaining and arbitration processes.

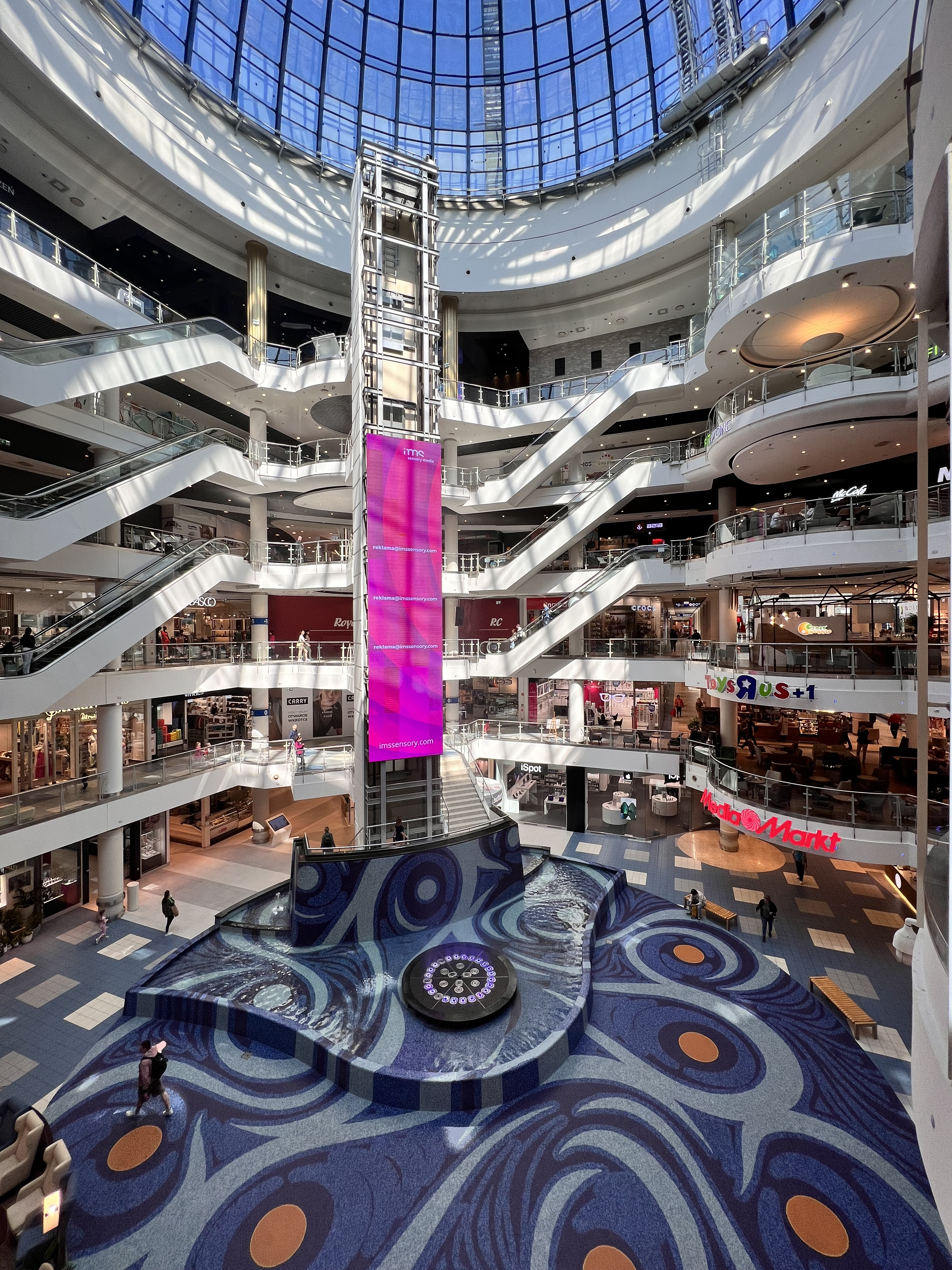
Shopping mall in Warsaw, Poland

In the post-war period, an American architect, Victor Gruen developed a concept for a shopping mall; a planned, self-contained shopping complex complete with an indoor plaza, statues, planting schemes, piped music, and car parking. Gruen's vision was to create a shopping atmosphere where people felt so comfortable that they would spend more time in the environment, thereby enhancing purchasing opportunities. The first of these malls opened at Northland Mall near Detroit in 1954. He went on to design some 50 such malls. Due to the success of the mall concept, Gruen was described as "the most influential architect of the twentieth century by a journalist in the New Yorker".

Throughout the twentieth century, a trend towards larger store footprints became discernible. The average size of a U.S. supermarket grew from 31,000 square feet (2,900 m^{2}) square feet in 1991 to 44,000 square feet (4,100 m^{2}) square feet in 2000. In 1963, Carrefour opened the first hypermarket in St Genevieve-de-Bois, near Paris, France. By the end of the twentieth century, stores were using labels such as "mega-stores" and "warehouse" stores to reflect their growing size. In Australia, for example, the popular hardware chain, Bunnings has shifted from smaller "home centres" (retail floor space under 5,000 square metres (54,000 sq ft)) to "warehouse" stores (retail floor space between 5,000 square metres (54,000 sq ft) and 21,000 square metres (230,000 sq ft)) to accommodate a wider range of goods and in response to population growth and changing consumer preferences. The upward trend of increasing retail space was not consistent across nations and led in the early 21st century to a 2-fold difference in square footage per capita between the United States and Europe.

As the 21st century takes shape, some indications suggest that large retail stores have come under increasing pressure from online sales models and that reductions in store size are evident. Under such competition and other issues such as business debt, there has been a noted business disruption called the retail apocalypse in recent years in which several retail businesses, especially in North America, are sharply reducing their number of stores or going out of business entirely.

== See also ==
- History of retail in Southern California
- History of marketing
- Merchant § History
- Marketplace § History
