= Meathouse, Kentucky =

Unincorporated community in Kentucky, United States

Meathouse
- Unincorporated community
- Location within the state of Kentucky Meathouse (the United States)
- Coordinates: 37°35′47″N 82°13′40″W
- Country: United States
- State: Kentucky
- County: Pike
- Elevation: 1,335 ft (407 m)
- Time zone: UTC-5 (Eastern (EST))
  - Summer (DST): UTC-4 (EDT)
- GNIS feature ID: 2336914

Meathouse is an unincorporated community located in Pike County, Kentucky, United States.
