= Shambles, Shepton Mallet =

Shambles in Shepton Mallet, England

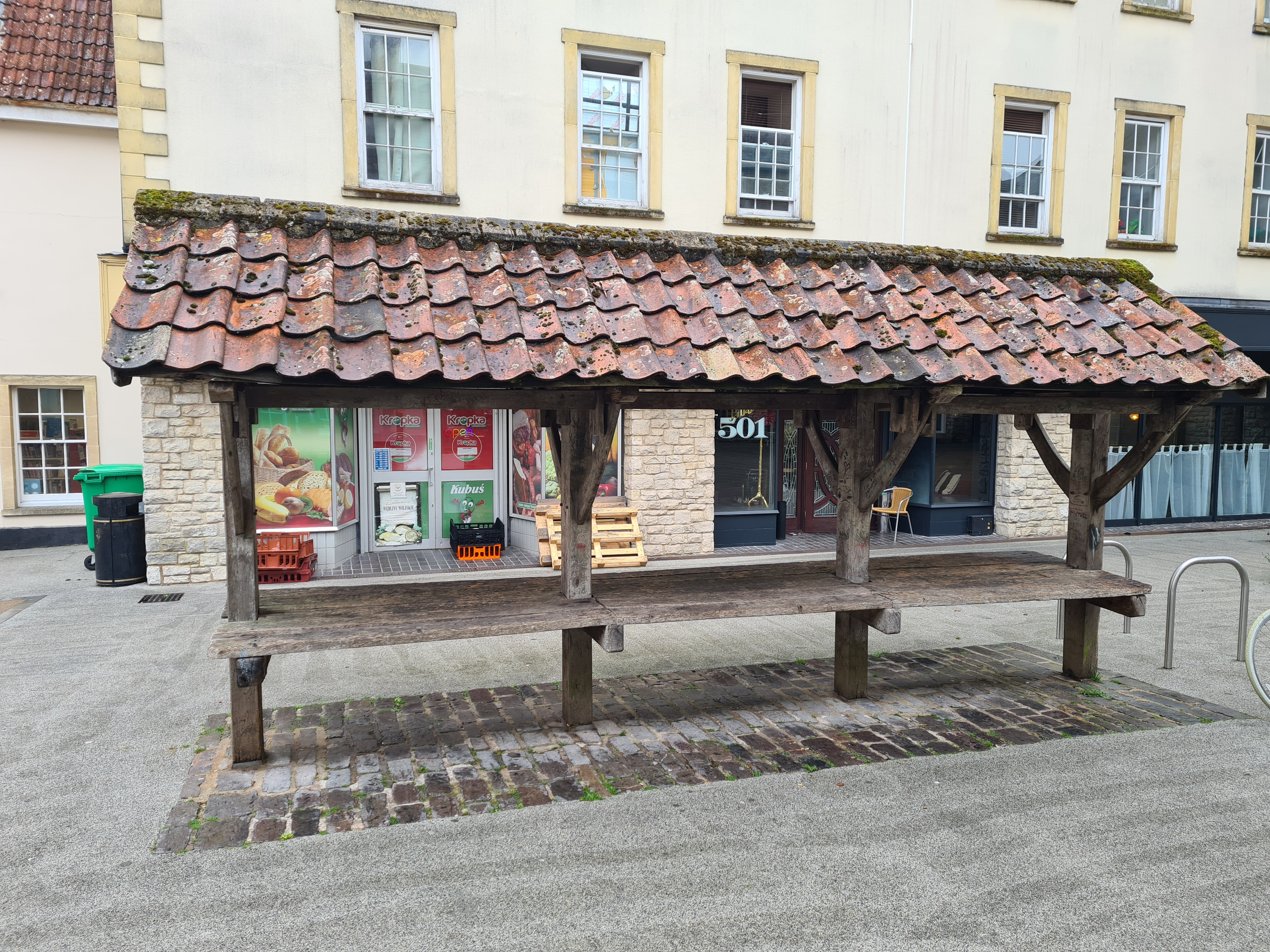
- Shambles at the Market Place

- Location within Somerset
- 51.190795°N 2.5464329°W
- Type: Market stalls
- Location: Market Place, Shepton Mallet, Somerset, England

History
- Founded: c. 1450
- Demolished: 1863 (south); 1919 (north)

Site notes
- Height: Countertop 1 metre (3.3 feet) from ground
- Architectural styles: Middle Ages timber framing, with twentieth-century restoration
- Restored: 1919 (as a monument)
- Governing body: Shepton Mallet town council

Listed Building – Grade II
- Official name: Shambles
- Designated: 20 May 1952 (74 years ago)
- Reference no.: 1173341
- SHER (Note: Somerset Historic Environment Record.): 24914

The Shambles (/ʃˈæmbəlz/) is a Grade II listed monument located in Shepton Mallet, Somerset, England. It is a twentieth-century reconstruction of butcher's market stalls that once lined the market place at Shepton Mallet. These stalls came to be known as "shambles", a term derived from the Middle English: fleshammels, lit. 'flesh shelves'. These shambles used curved roof timbers that have suggested a construction date of c. 1450. The same timbers were used in other roofs for that period, for example, the Tithe Barn at Doulting, Somerset.

The shambles came to be regarded as unhygienic, and consequently, calls were made for them to be removed. They fell gradually into disuse, and those on the south side of the market place were removed in 1863. In 1919, the town council removed the remaining shambles from the north side. In the same year, a trust was established to reconstruct three bays of shambles, and in October of that year, these bays were re‑erected in the market place. Despite later substantial reconstruction and replacement, the monument is believed to be the last example of a shambles that remains in England from the Middle Ages.

== Etymology ==
In the Middle Ages, animals were slaughtered in the street, and consequently, butchers, as well as fishmongers, were allocated market stalls away from the market place. These stalls came to be known as "shambles", a term derived from the Middle English: fleshammels, lit. 'flesh shelves'. Shammel is a descendent of the Old English: scamel, or sceamel (among its various other spellings), meaning a bench, stool, or pew. Scamel was a West Germanic borrowing from the colloquial Latin word scamellum, the Latin diminutive form of scamnum.

In Old English orthography, the voiceless postalveolar fricative /ʃ/ ⟨sh⟩ sound, when voiced before a vowel, was written as the digraph ⟨sc⟩. In Middle English orthography, it came to be written as the trigraph ⟨sch⟩, or the digraph ⟨sh⟩. The voiced bilabial plosive stop, bʷ, the ⟨b⟩ after the labial nasal ⟨m⟩ in shambles, was added by epenthesis. The first occurrence in print of the epenthetic ⟨b⟩ in shambles was in 1477, in a roll that sets out a statute for Waterford, Ireland, where "... it was ordained and enacted if only man or woman sell flesh within the city or suburbs till it come to the King's sheambles [sic]." Thus, over time, the spelling of scamel evolved to "~~sc~~[+sh]am[+b]el". Shambles was later adopted as a general term for any stalls that farmers and smallholders used to sell their produce.

== History ==
=== Origin of the market ===
The market place was likely considerably larger than the present area. In 1972, an excavation took place that found that the area was open and predated the town. However, there is little evidence that this land was occupied in the Anglo-Saxon period. In the 8th century, an Anglo‑Saxon charter granted this land to Glastonbury Abbey. By Domesday, there was a mill, a sheep farm, and possibly a village, which was held by Roger de Courcelle, feudal baron of Curry Mallet.

On 6 July 1219, Shepton Mallet was granted a market charter by Henry III of England to Hugh de Vivonne, then High Sheriff of Somerset. Hugh had married Mabel Malet, the daughter of William Malet, a later heir to the feudal barony of Curry Mallet and a Magna Carta surety. When the king became of age to rule, the charter was regranted on 23 March 1235, but it was rescinded in October of that year. Jocelin of Wells, Bishop of Bath, had objected to the grant as he believed it would have prejudiced the market at Wells, Somerset.

A charter was granted on 18 February 1318, by Edward II of England to Cecilia de Bello Campo ("Cecily Beauchamp") and her heirs. Cecily was an heir of Mabel, the wife of Hugh de Vivonne. (Note: Cecily was the daughter of William de Vivonne, the son of Hugh de Vivonne. She went on to marry John Beauchamp, 1st Baron Beauchamp of Somerset.) One part (moiety) of the manor of Shepton Mallet was passed to Cecily, and one portion to the heirs of Cecily's sister, Eleanor. A weekly Monday market was granted, along with an annual fair for three days around 11 June, the feast day of Barnabas. The fair continued to be held on this date until 1729, when it was changed to 8 August. From 7 October 1357, Reginald Fitz Herbert (or "Herberd") was holding a Friday market, and it is still held on this day.

=== Post-Middle Ages development of shambles and stalls ===
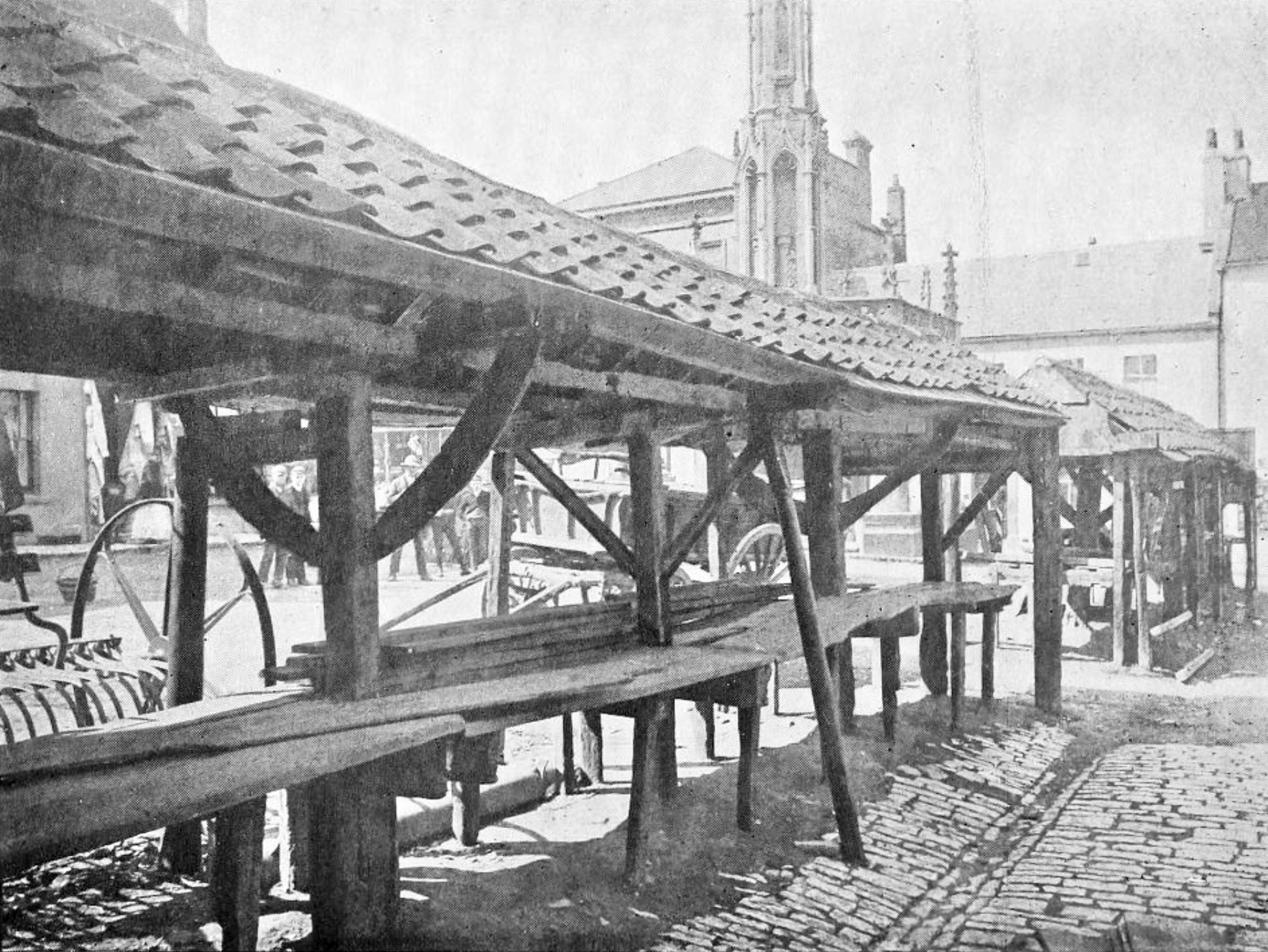
The cobblestone alley behind the shambles on the north side

The first shamble at the market place was probably erected between c. 1440 – c. 1450, made of stone, and used to sell meat. The oak cruck roof trusses, used in the roof of the re‑erected shambles, suggest a construction date of c. 1450. The same curved timbers were used in other roofs for that period, for example, the Tithe Barn at Doulting, Somerset. The market cross was erected in 1500, and market traders moved their stalls, standings, booths, and shambles around it. These wooden shambles could be permanent or temporary structures, but it was easier for the trader to leave it set up, rather than dismantle it at the end of the market day.

By 1574, Thomas Leigh of Wells, held a moiety share of the market tolls "for all the fish and flesh shambles in the Market Place of Shepton Mallet, of the void ground in the market and of the profits of the market to be kept there every Friday." According to parish records, in 1612, the market toll for hiring a stand on market day was "not exceeding 3 pennies per stand, if a butcher, not exceeding 4 pennies. Everyone has liberty to bring his own stands there, not exceeding one penny." By 1629, William Strode had granted his share to John Strode, and permanent shambles had been erected on the north and south sides of the market.

In 1695, the cost of renting a shamble for a year ranged from 16 to 20 shillings. To keep the market clean and tidy, two wardens of the shambles were appointed each year, along with bread and ale tasters. These appointments were the preserve of the Duchy of Cornwall, after the manor was devolved by the Crown to the Duke of Cornwall, following the death in 1536 of Henry FitzRoy, Duke of Richmond and Somerset.

=== Nineteenth-century decline ===
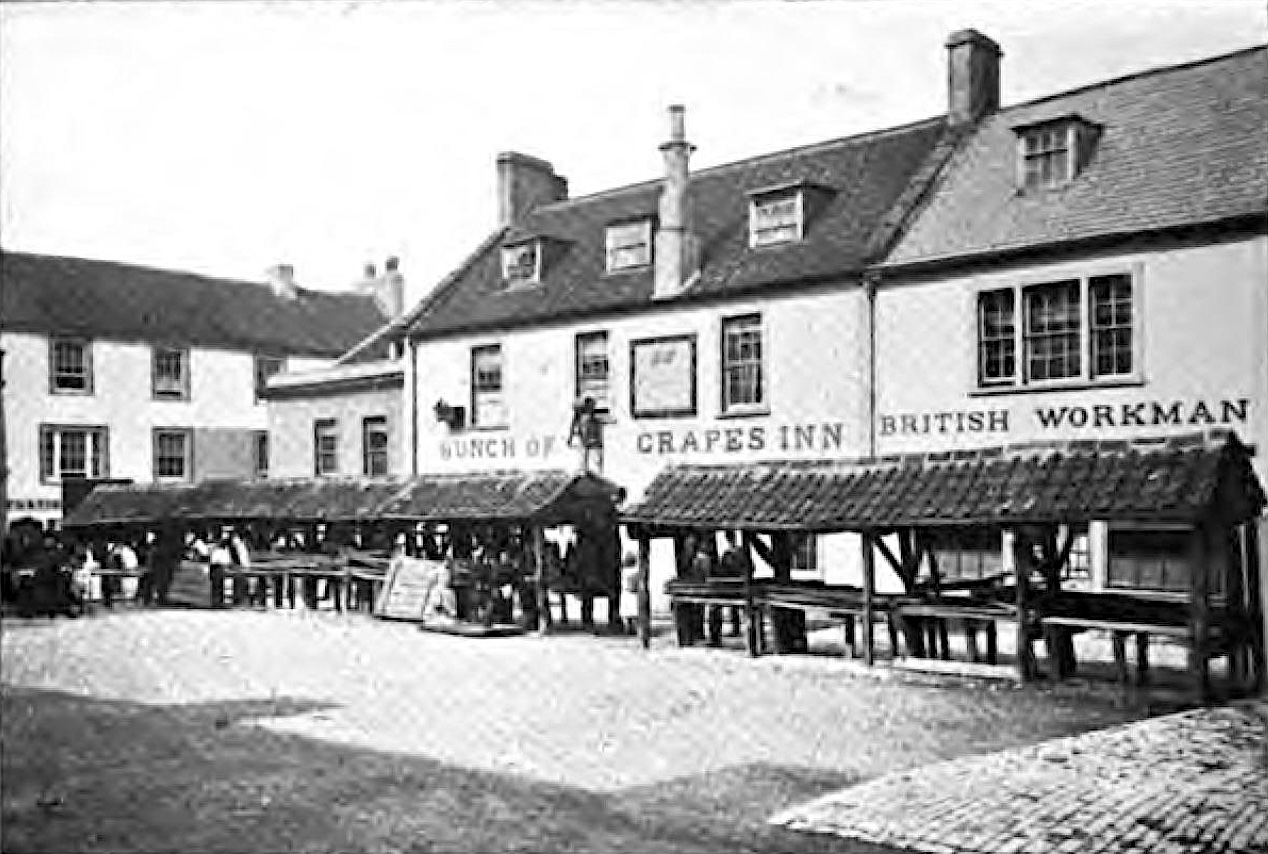
The shambles on the north side of the market

By 1824, the shambles were in a poor state of repair, and the traders asked the shamble wardens, Browne and Mines, to call a meeting with the market owners. On 26 November 1824, the traders met the owners, Thomas Curtis Leman, a Bristol solicitor, and William Stallard, the owner of the Crown Inn in Draycott Road, Shepton Mallet, at the Assembly Room behind the High Street. Leman agreed to contract a surveyor to estimate for a new shambles. However, Stallard was made bankrupt in 1827, and subsequently, his share of the moiety of market, shambles, and tolls, was auctioned on 18 October 1827, and held on the manor of Shepton Mallet for three lives.

Many carts of meat had been sold weekly, but by 1853, only four butchers were using the shambles. The shambles, and the other outdoor market stalls, came to be regarded as unhygienic, and consequently, calls were made for them to be removed. The 23 July 1858 leader column for the Shepton Mallet Journal, gave the opinion that the shambles "are a standing disgrace to us; dirty, dilapidated, and disgusting; needless, fatal disfigurements of what might be a handsome market place." On 7 August 1863, the Shepton Mallet Journal reported that the shambles on the south side of the market place had been dismantled and removed by James Burgess, a shoemaker, and the then owner of the market place and rights.

By 1871, only two of the remaining shambles were used by butchers on market days. (Note: The shambles were also used by people sheltering from inclement weather.) By the 1890s, Francis Porch Parker, and his son, Frederick James, were the lease holders, and later, the owners of the market place, shambles, and tolls. During their lifetime, the Parkers resisted all calls to remove the shambles. Around this time, members of the local natural history society expressed regret that the remaining shambles were so decayed that they could not be expected to last. They pointed out that the shambles were of great age, were rare, and likely the last remaining example of its kind in England.

=== Twentieth-century removal and reconstruction ===
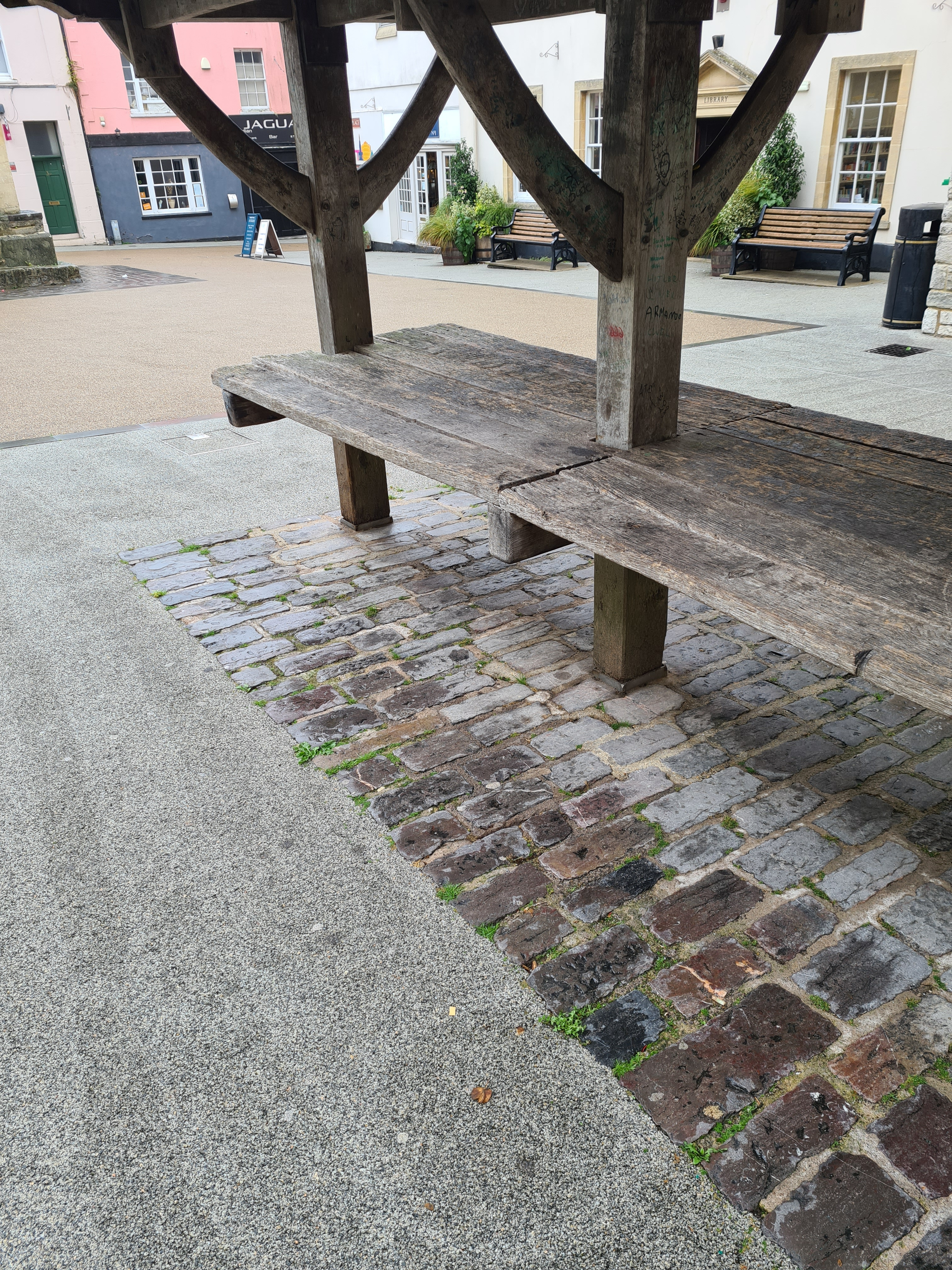
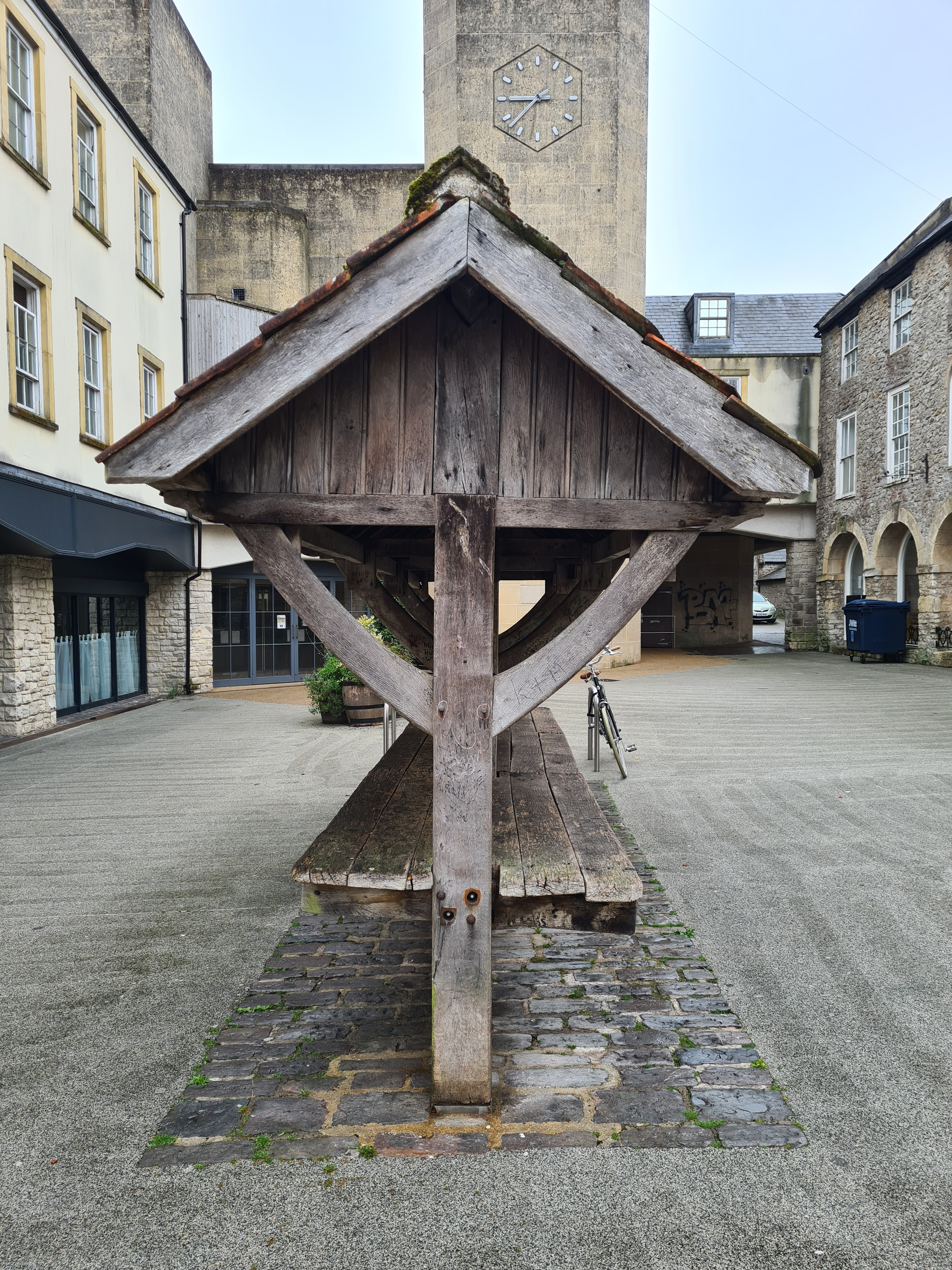
Countertop or bench, cruck roof trusses, and pitched‑brick floor

Parker died in January 1893, and Frederick James inherited his father's share of the market property. Frederick died in late 1916, and subsequently, his widow offered the property to the council for the sum of £420 (equivalent to £25,200 in 2025). On 22 January 1917, Shepton Mallet town council convened a meeting to discuss the offer at the Council Hall. It was accepted, and for the first time, the market place and shambles were under public ownership. It was also agreed to postpone any decision on the future of the shambles until the following year, once the council had looked at how they might be improved.

The council decided to obtain expert opinions from Arthur Bulleid and Frederick Bligh Bond. Bulleid suggested that they reduce the number of the shambles, by taking off two or three bays, and repair the remainder with the materials salvaged from other bays. Bligh Bond responded with detailed plans and estimates to incorporate the shambles in a war memorial. However, the scheme was judged too expensive at £550 (equivalent to £27,000 in 2025), and it would also mean the shambles would lose their original character. Instead, the council decided to form a committee to consider other options. Their recommendation was to construct three sections of shambles, about 5 metres (18 feet) in length, in front of the Black Swan Inn at the market place.

James Archibald Garton, a member of the council, offered to source the oak timbers, pantiles, and pitching‑bricks for the floor. Private donations funded the estimated £50 (equivalent to £2,200 in 2025) cost of reconstruction, with the remainder placed in trust for the upkeep of the shambles. In the week commencing 20 October 1919, three bays of the shambles were re‑erected in the market place. In January 1951, it was scheduled as an ancient monument by the Ministry of Works, and designated formally on 20 May 1952.

The Shambles, as the monument is now known, continued to be used on market days, but not for the sale of meat. By the end of 1961, it required urgent repair; the structural supports had rotted, and the iron plates, used in the past to repair the supports, had been inadequate. The wooden bars, brackets, and cleats had to be replaced, and the ridge tiles rebedded. However, much of the ancient wood was preserved and treated with insecticide. From 1966, the Ancient Monuments and Historic Buildings Directorate, embarked on a national resurvey of buildings and monuments of special historical interest. Subsequently, in 1968, the Shambles was registered as a Grade II listed building.

In November 1972, the Showering family's redevelopment of the market place resulted in the demolition of the Black Swan Inn, and the Shambles being placed in storage until the development was complete. In 1973, the area incorporating the older central core of Shepton Mallet was designated a conservation area. It contains the majority of listed buildings in the town, including the Shambles and Market Cross.

=== Contemporary preservation ===
The Shambles is essentially an original timber shed of the 15th century — a very rare and lucky survival.

— Nikolaus Pevsner, North Somerset and Bristol (First published 1958).

In 1998, the council became concerned that the Shambles would collapse after one of the legs was found to be unstable. Repairs were completed in February 1999, but shortly afterwards, the structure was vandalised. Caroe & Partners, surveyors appointed by the council, stated that it would be necessary to replace all the legs and fix them to the ground. However, English Heritage objected to the planned changes, as they were concerned that the existing posts were constructed of original wood. The council and surveyors disagreed and responded that the posts were probably replaced in the 1970s. Following the repairs, the Shambles was descheduled as an ancient monument on 21 March 2001.

In July 2007, the council decided that the Shambles required cleaning, wood preservation, and where possible, the removal of graffiti. Remedial work was completed in the following year. By 2018, the roof was missing pantiles and the oak countertop was sloping. By the end of 2022, repairs to the structure had been completed, and the cobblestones underneath the Shambles had been repointed. Despite substantial reconstruction and replacement, it remains on the National Heritage List for England, and is believed to be the last example of a shambles that remains in England from the Middle Ages.

== Architecture ==
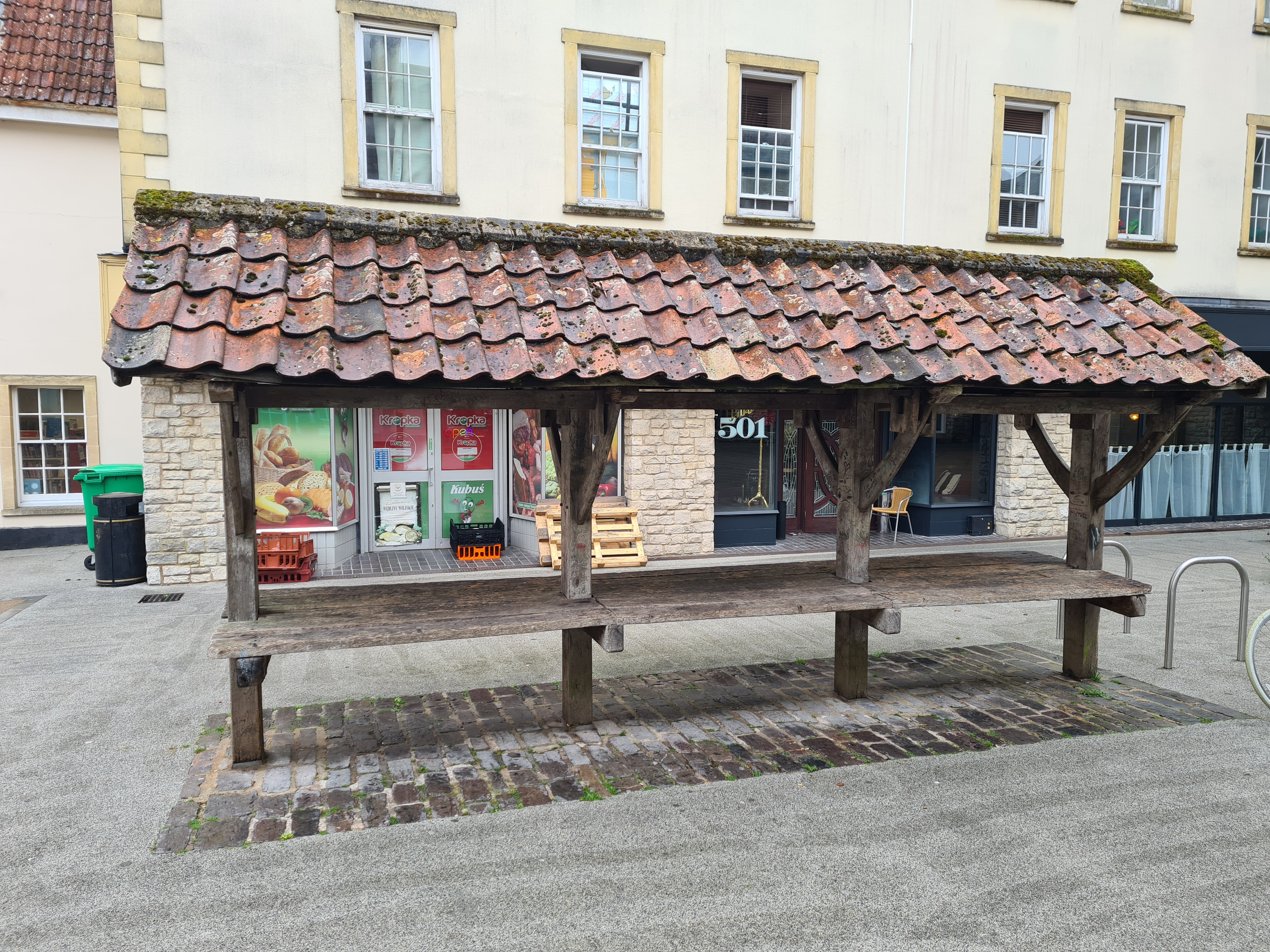
Architecture

1	Pantile roof
2	Median posts
3	Cruck roof trusses

4	Oak bench
5	Pitched‑brick floor

The Shambles is constructed from oak timbers, with an attached countertop or bench, and protected by a pantile roof. The roof is supported by a row of median posts and each post had two arms carrying the rafters. These arms were curved in the original shambles, but later renovations were realised with straight arms.

After the Shambles was repaired in 1962, a framed photograph of the old shambles was affixed to it, with a narration that read as follows:

The Shambles

A.D. 1450 (circa).

A shamble was a stall used for the sale of provisions but having a particular association with meat.

Shepton Mallet's medieval shambles once stood in rows on the north and south sides of the Market Place, separated from the adjacent houses by a gangway ten to fifteen feet wide.

The curved timbers supporting the roof suggest a date of about 1450.

In the early nineteenth century, those on the south side were demolished but those on the north remained until 1919. One bay, after renovation, was re‑erected as a permanent memento. It is still used on Market Day and remains as a unique survival from medieval days.

== In popular culture ==
On 14 January 1988, the Shambles was featured in Angela Rippon's travel documentary series Day Out, in an episode entitled "The Southern Edge of Mendip", and broadcast on BBC Two. It was also filmed for the television documentary series Cobblestones, Cottages and Castles, in an episode entitled "High Street Hype", that was broadcast on 12 October 1990 by Television South West. Courtney Milan's 2011 book, Unclaimed, employs the original shambles as a plot device to introduce the two main characters to each other. The Shepton Mallet Shambles Carnival Club, a regular participant in the West Country Carnival circuit, is named after the Shambles.

== See also ==
- History of retail
- History of Somerset
- List of scheduled monuments in Mendip
- The Shambles

== Bibliography ==
- Pevsner, Nikolaus (1995) [First published 1958]. "Shepton Mallet". North Somerset and Bristol. The Buildings of England. Harmondsworth: Penguin Books. pp. 257–260. ISBN 978-0-14-071013-7. OCLC 37512579.
