= Meet market =

Sexual term

A meet market (or meat market) is a location or activity in which people are viewed as commodities, or a business like a nightclub where people typically look for a casual sex partner. The term is also used metaphorically, for example, to refer to the process of deciding which man to "buy" for a husband, or for finding a man to date at the grocery market.

It has evolved to mean a place or activity at which single people congregate, and while formerly a pejorative, has become neutral.

== Original connotations ==
The sexual revolution of the 1960s and the internal migration of Americans to big cities meant that singles events in mid and large-size cities quickly replaced local town activities where participants previously knew each other. By the 1970s, singles events had developed a reputation as a "ritual of lies and mistrust", replete with men in search of casual sex, cold and unfriendly women, and frequent misunderstandings.

Events and bars, lounges, and nightclubs frequented by singles became known as meet/meat markets, or places where attendees rapidly sized up members of the opposite sex with objectifying criteria, such as attractiveness, wealth, and fashion sense, before taking the time to get to know attendees on a deeper level.

== Reclamation of term ==
In recent years, the term meet market has become neutral or even been reclaimed largely by commentators on the single scene and event promoters. For example, a number of singles event promoters have chosen to name their events after some variation of the term. These uses include "Meet Market" for a singles mixer, "Meet Market Adventures" for a company catering adventure experiences to singles, and "'meet market' for Moses" for a Jewish singles event designed by religious organizations trying to ensure Jewish marriage and continuity.

Dating commentators and city guides now discuss meet markets in benign or positive terms, counseling readers to make use of meet markets to find a refined established gentlemen who desires marriage, an enjoyable short-term young professional dating partner, new friends of the same sex, or a long-term committed relationship, if desired.
