= Meat market =

Marketplace selling meat

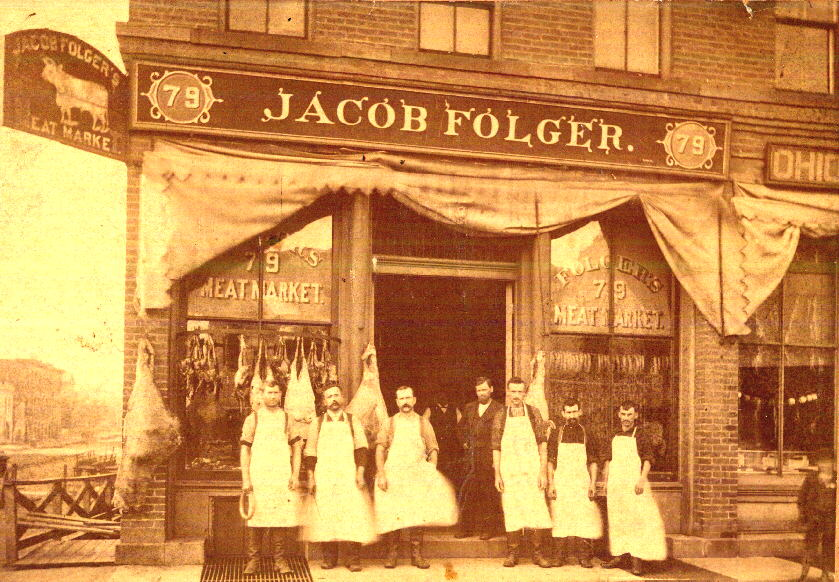
Jacob Folger Meat Market in Toledo, Ohio, approximately 1885

A meat market is, traditionally, a marketplace where meat is sold, often by a butcher. It is a specialized wet market. In North America, it may be a meat retail store or butcher's shop. During the mid and late 19th century scientific research into epidemiology, sanitation and urban planning in Western countries led to the establishment of meat markets so that the slaughtering and sale of meat could be easily monitored and the risk of disease outbreaks could be minimized.

== Overview of meat trade ==
A butcher specializes in the preparation and sale of meat. Butchers sometimes operate specialized shops selling meat, known as butcher's shops, meat stores, meat markets or butcheries. Meat may also be sold in supermarkets, grocery stores, and fish markets, and these shops may employ a butcher.

A slaughterhouse or abattoir is a facility that specializes in killing animals for meat. A meat cutter prepares primal cuts of meat into smaller portions for retail sale.

== Examples ==
Worldwide

• Butchery Market

- London wholesale meat markets:
  - Leadenhall Market
  - Smithfield Market (began as a livestock market, but became a meat, poultry and fish market)
- Medieval meat markets in the rest of England:
  - The Shambles, York
  - Shambles, Shepton Mallet
  - Stroud
- Melbourne:
  - Metropolitan Meat Market
  - Queen Victoria Market
- Plaza Juan Ponce de León meat market, Puerto Rico

== Gallery ==
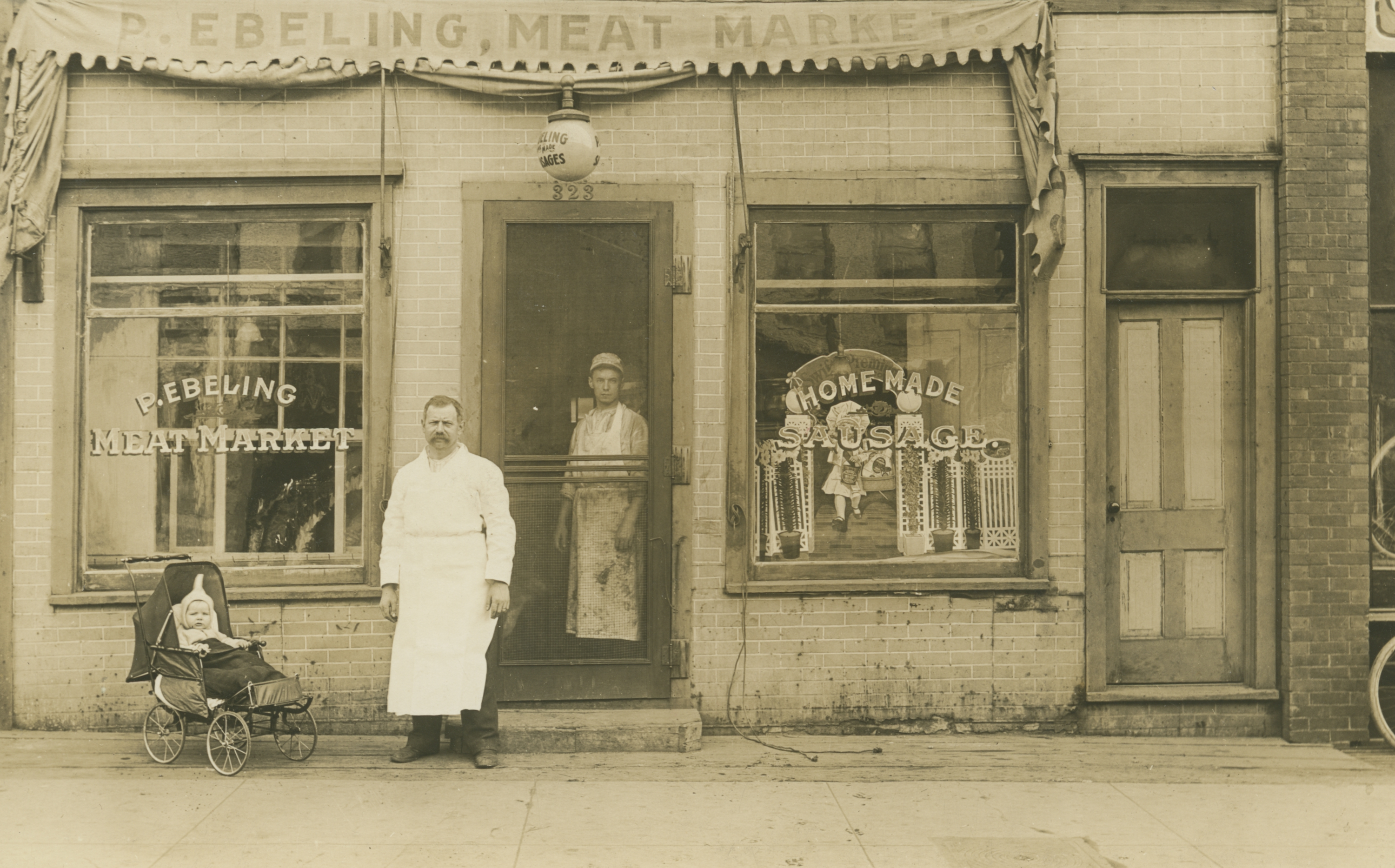
Ebeling Meat Market, Mason City, Iowa, 1914

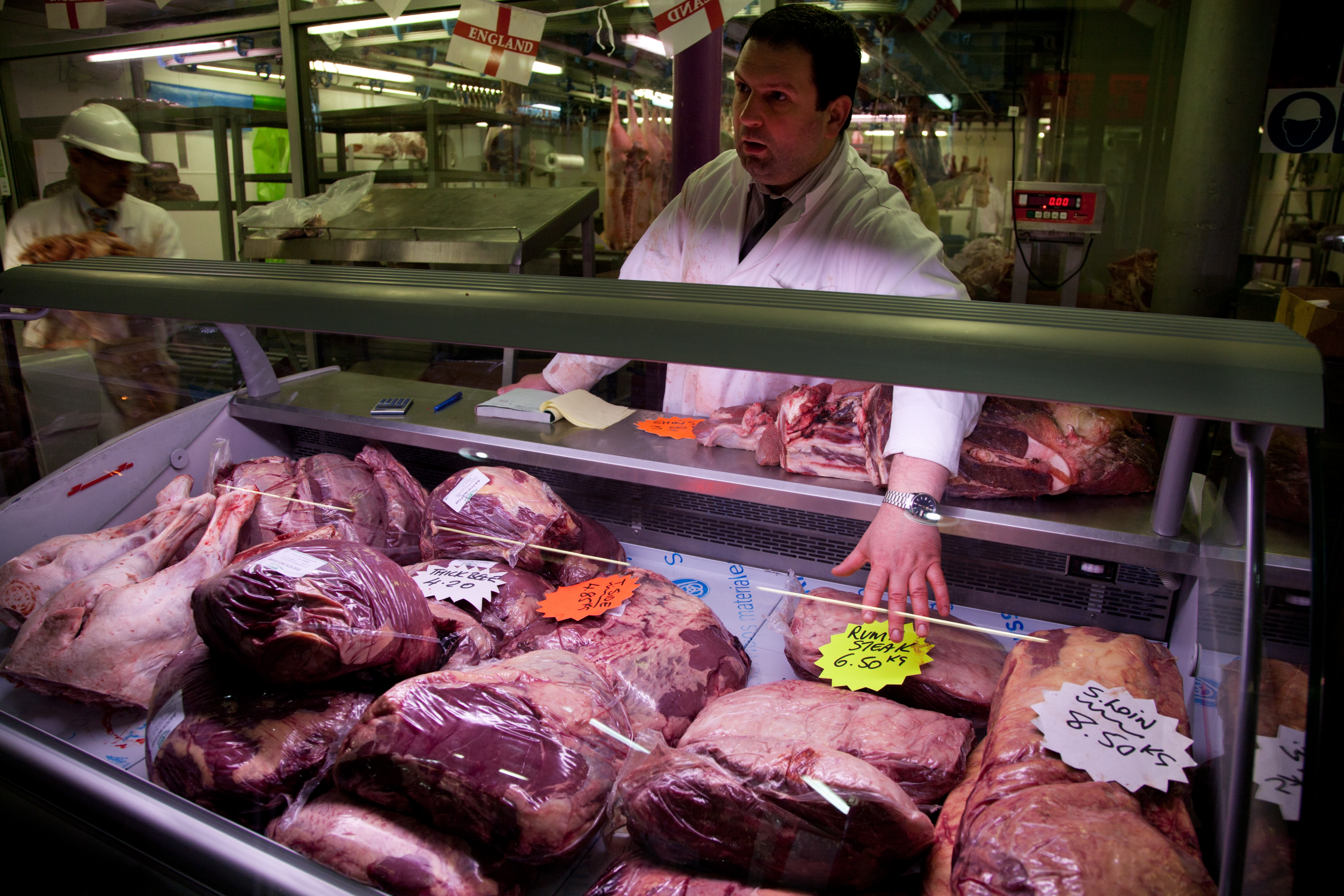
Inside the Butchery Market. The market dates back at least 800 years.

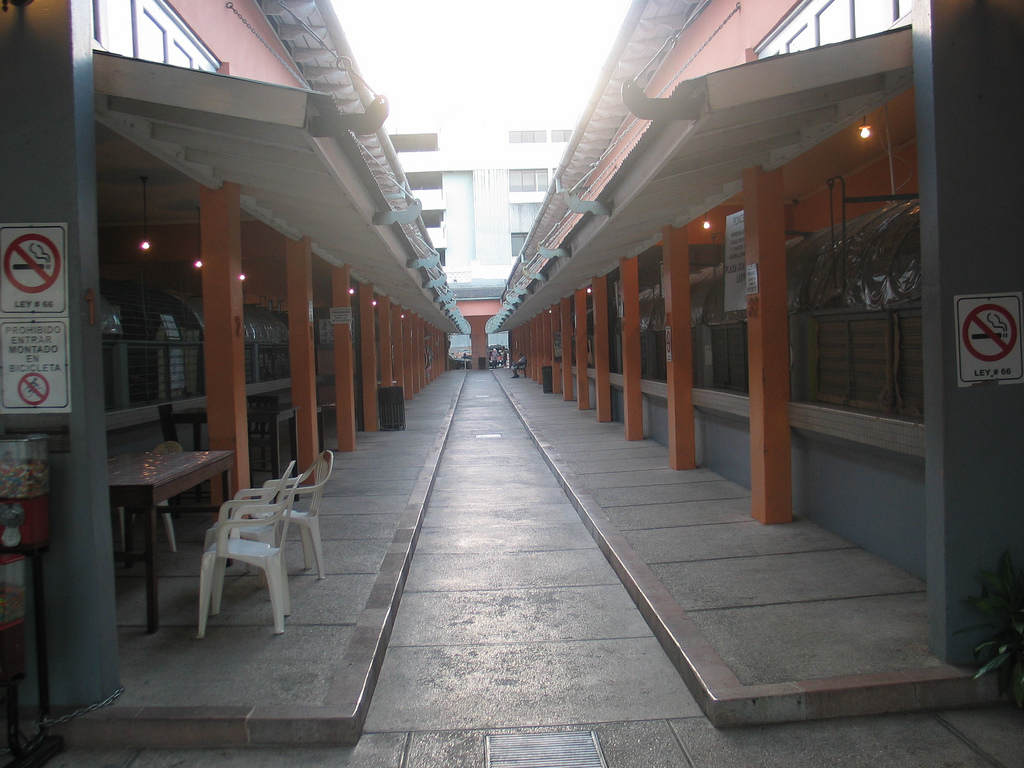
