= Church of St Mary the Virgin, Croscombe =

Church in Somerset, England

Church of St Mary the Virgin
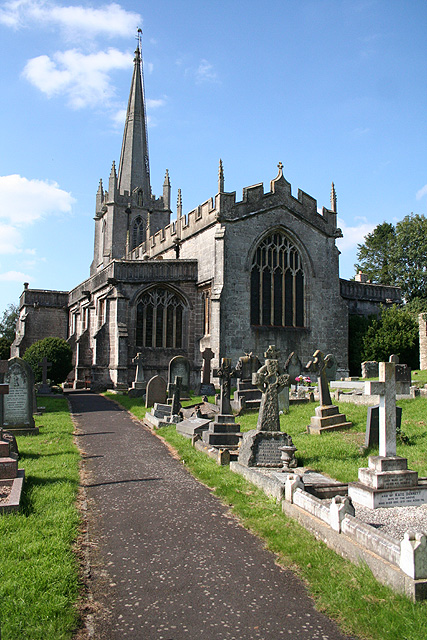

- Location within Somerset

General information
- Location: Croscombe, England
- Coordinates: 51.1975°N 2.5873°W
- Construction started: 15th century
- Completed: 16th century

The Anglican Church of St Mary the Virgin in Croscombe, Somerset, England, is primarily from the 15th and 16th centuries with 19th-century restoration. It has been designated as a Grade I listed building.

It consists of a nave, chancel and has north and south aisles. The church is unusual in Somerset in having a spire, which rises above a three-stage tower which is supported by diagonal buttresses. St Mary's includes a peal of six bells, the earliest dated 1613, (Note: List of bells. 1 (treble): Mears of Whitechapel, 1808; 2: 1613; 3: Thomas Bilbie of Bristol, 1734; 4: Mears, 1808; 5: Mears, 1820; 6 (tenor): 1658. Source: Ellacombe, Henry Thomas (1875). The Church Bells of Somerset. Exeter: Printed for the author by William Pollard. p. 43.) and an organ by Gray and Davison from 1837.

The Jacobean interior woodwork including the pulpit and rood screen are of national renown. The pulpit is decorated with the arms of Arthur Lake who was the Bishop of Bath and Wells in the 17th century.

The churchyard contains war graves of four service personnel, one of World War I and three of World War II.

The parish is part of the benefice of Pilton with Croscombe, North Wootton and Dinder within the Diocese of Bath and Wells.

== See also ==
- List of Grade I listed buildings in Mendip
- List of towers in Somerset
- List of ecclesiastical parishes in the Diocese of Bath and Wells
