= Church of St Michael, Dinder =

Church in Somerset, England

Church of St Michael
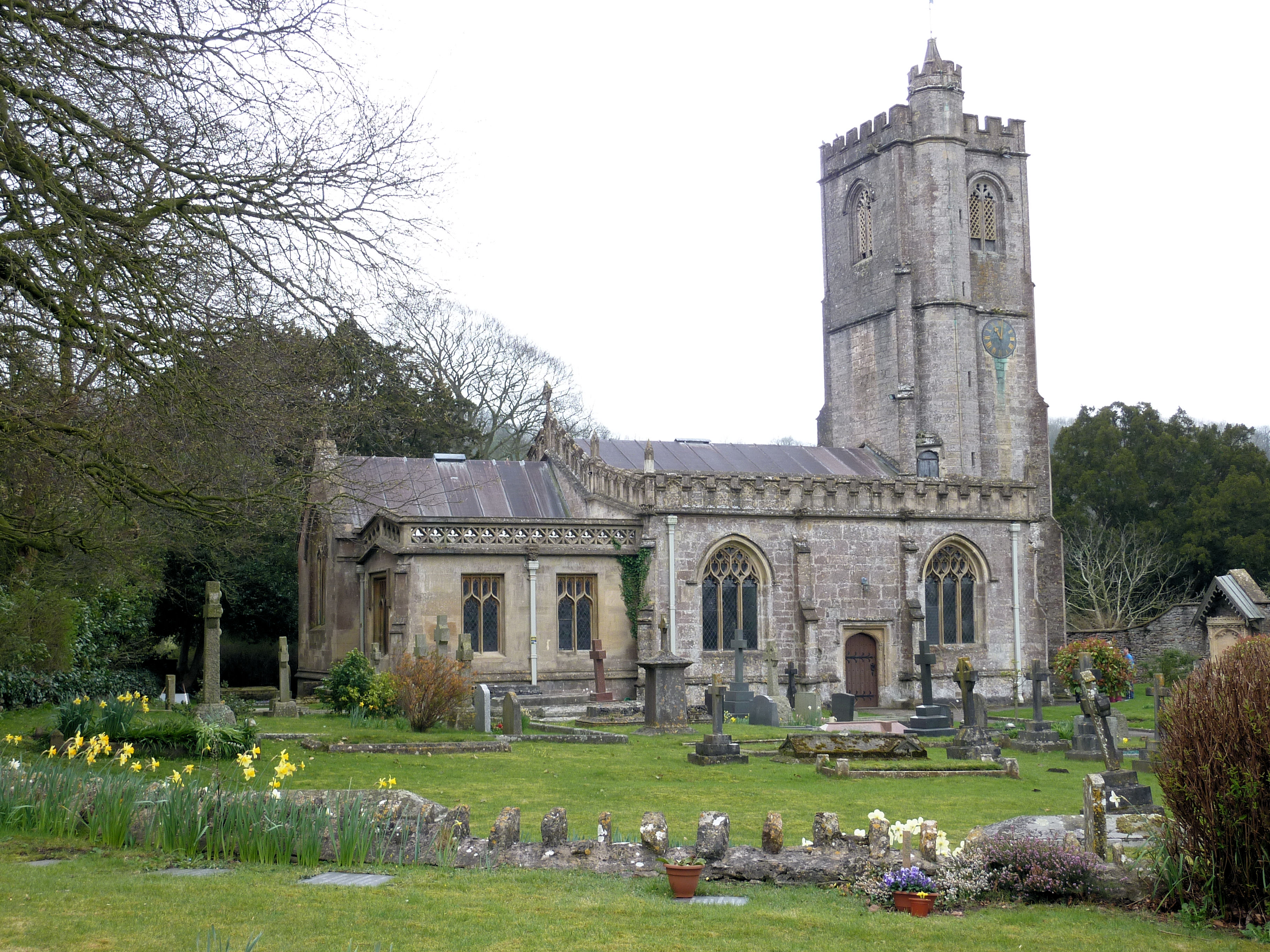

- Location within Somerset
- 51.1990°N 2.6094°W
- Location: Dinder, Somerset, England

History
- Built: 15th century

Listed Building – Grade II*
- Official name: Church of St Michael
- Designated: 22 November 1966
- Reference no.: 1345121

The Anglican Church of St Michael in Dinder, Somerset, England has Norman origins and was built in the 14th century before being rebuilt in the 15th. It is a Grade II* listed building.

== History ==
A church was established in Dinder after the Norman Conquest, however the current building was first erected in the 14th century. Major rebuilding was undertaken in the 15th century. A Victorian restoration was carried out in 1872 when the chancel was rebuilt.

The parish is within the benefice of Pilton with Croscombe, North Wootton and Dinder which is part of the Diocese of Bath and Wells.

== Architecture ==
The church consists of a three-bay nave, chancel, north aisle and a north organ chamber. The three-stage tower is supported by diagonal buttresses.

Inside the church are a stone pulpit and perpendicular font and piscina.

There is a stone carving of a two-headed dragon about the south chapel window. The legend of the Dragon of Dinder goes back for centuries, and is documented on illuminated transcript which is now preserved in Eton College Library Records. The legend goes that a terrible Dragon was terrorising both livestock and villagers. The then Bishop Jocelyn was called upon to save the people of Dinder. He rode out with his men at arms, but at the last furlong commanded them to remain at a distance while he rode on and single-handedly beheaded the beast.

The stone cross in the churchyard dates from the 14th century.

== See also ==
- List of ecclesiastical parishes in the Diocese of Bath and Wells
