= Kilver Court =

House in Shepton Mallet, Somerset, England

Coordinates: 51.1907°N 2.5360°W

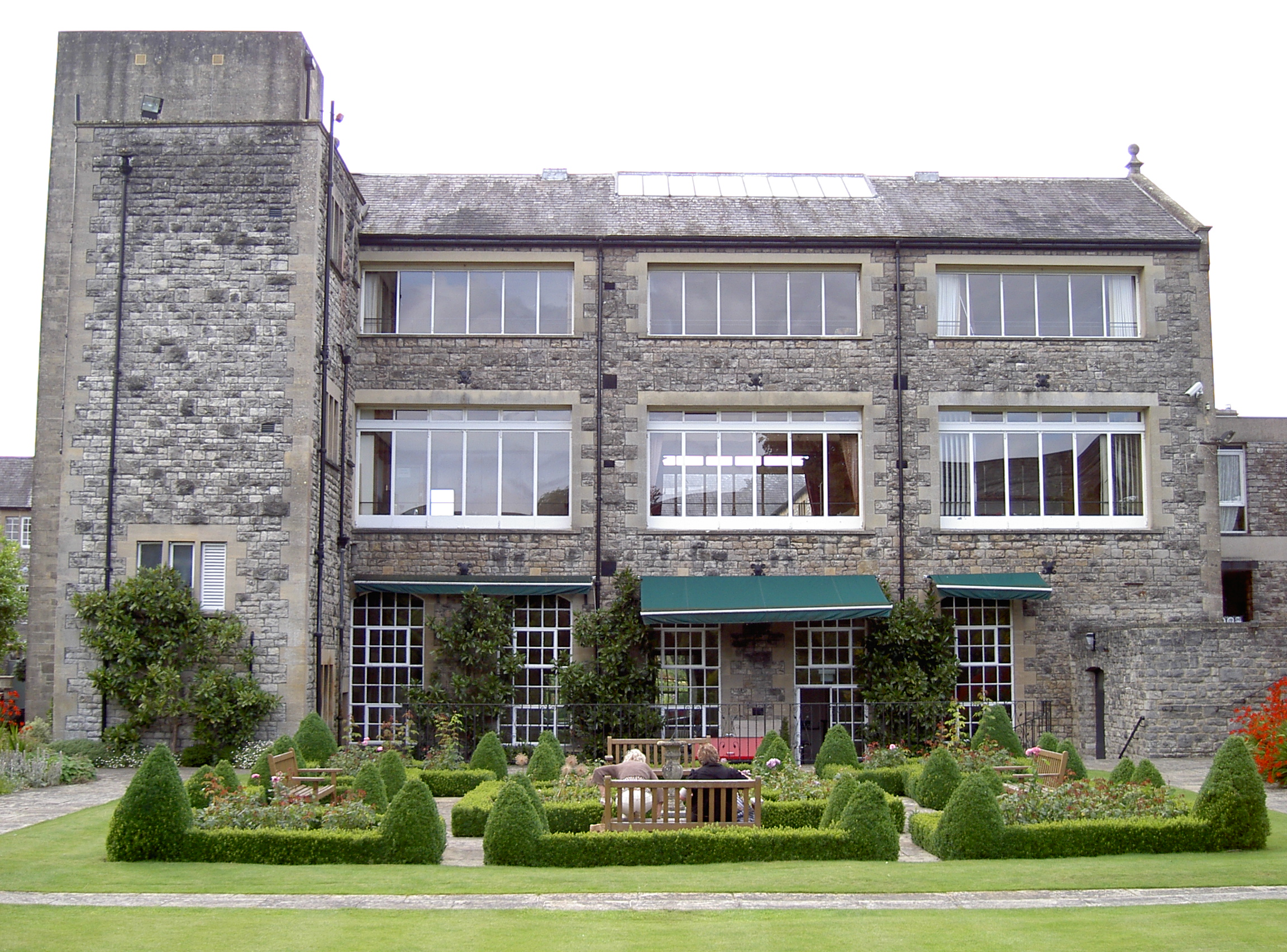
Kilver Court

Kilver Court is a historic house and gardens in Shepton Mallet in the English county of Somerset. The River Sheppey powered textile mills and it later became a factory, the headquarters of the Showerings brewing business (later part of Allied Domecq), and then the headquarters of a leather-goods manufacturer, Mulberry. It is now used as a shopping centre.

== History ==
Numbers 26, 26B and 27 Kilver Street were a country house built around 1650, since converted into offices and shops. They form a Grade II listed building. It was originally owned by the Whiting family which included Richard Whiting, who used it as their country house close to the mills used in woollen manufacturing, later converting to silk throwers and then lace production

The 19th century dovecote, known as the "Round House", and its adjacent gate piers and gates are also listed.

Over the course of the 20th century the site has been a factory, the headquarters of the Showerings brewing business (later part of Allied Domecq), and then the headquarters of a leather-goods manufacturer, Mulberry.

It has been used as a venue for the Shepton Mallet Digital Arts Festival. In 2010 the buildings were converted into a designer outlet by Roger Saul the founder of Mulberry. The stores include Mulberry, L.K.Bennett and Whistles. Following the Covid-19 pandemic, Saul decided in 2021 to sell the business, and Kilver Court was bought by the Showerings family, who had originally owned the site.

== Gardens ==
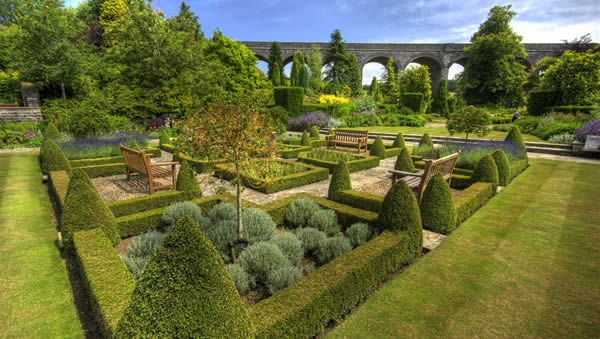
The gardens and Charlton Viaduct

The gardens are overlooked by the disused Charlton Viaduct as it crosses the River Sheppey. They were laid out in the 1880s by Ernest Jardine, the Member of Parliament for East Somerset, 1910 to 1918, for his lace workers. He used the old mill ponds as boating lakes, and also built a pub and schoolhouse. They became known as Jardine’s Park and included fruit and vegetable plots which provided food for the workers.

The current layout is a reproduction of a 1960s Chelsea Flower Show medal winning garden designed by George Whitelegg and includes a rockery and parterre. The area adjacent to the river includes hostas, day lilies and candelabra primulas.
