= Church of St Peter, North Wootton =

Church in Somerset, England

Church of St Peter
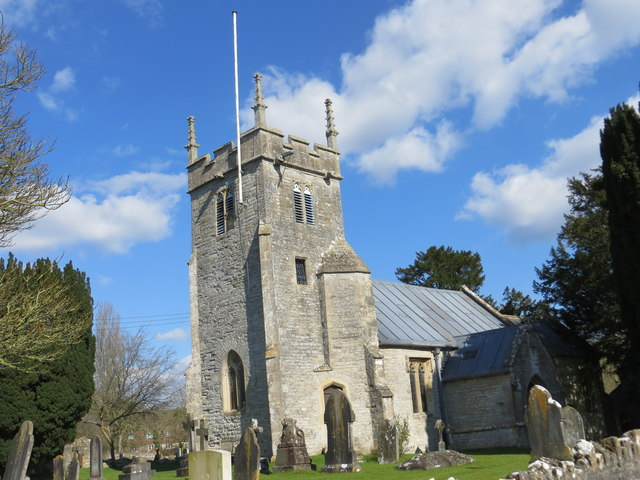

- Location within Somerset
- 51.1738°N 2.6254°W
- Location: North Wootton, Somerset, England

History
- Built: 14th or 15th century

Listed Building – Grade II*
- Official name: Church of St Peter
- Designated: 2 November 1966
- Reference no.: 1175106

The Anglican Church of St Peter in North Wootton, Somerset, England was built in the 14th or 15th century. It is a Grade II* listed building.

== History ==
A chapel existed in North Wootton in the 12th century under the control of the church in Pilton.

The current church was built in the 14th and 15th centuries and a Victorian restoration in the 19th when the chancel was rebuilt.

The parish is part of the benefice of Pilton with Croscombe, North Wootton and Dinder within the Diocese of Bath and Wells.

== Architecture ==
The small stone church has a nave and chancel each of two-bays. There is a sundial over the porch is dated 1767.

Inside the church are 15th century benches and a Norman font.

== See also ==
- List of ecclesiastical parishes in the Diocese of Bath and Wells
