= Charlton Viaduct =

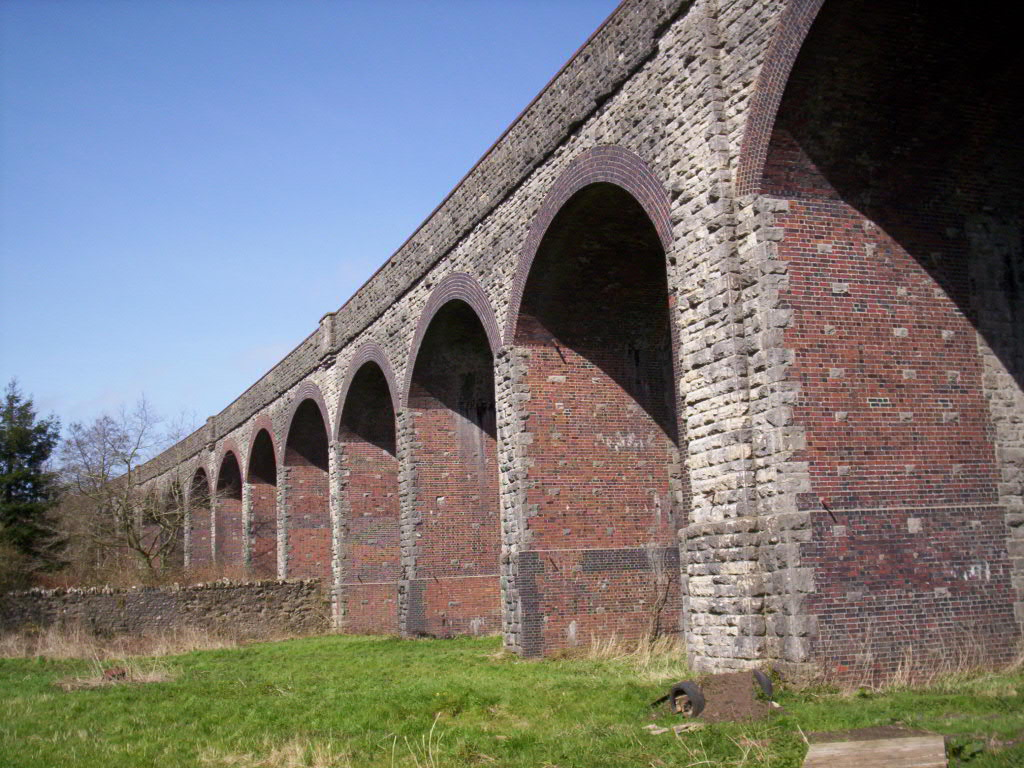
- Coordinates: 51.1895°N 2.5334°W
- Carries: Somerset and Dorset Joint Railway
- Crosses: River Sheppey
- Locale: Shepton Mallet, Somerset, England
- Heritage status: Grade II* listed building

Characteristics
- Material: Stone and brick
- Total length: 317 yards (290 m)
- Height: 45 feet (14 m)
- No. of spans: 27

History
- Construction start: 1870s
- Opened: 1874
- Closed: 1966

Location
- Interactive map of Charlton Viaduct

Charlton Viaduct is a disused railway bridge in Shepton Mallet, Somerset, in south-west England. It is a Grade II* listed building.

== History ==
The bridge was built in 1874 by the civil engineer William Henry Barlow for the Somerset and Dorset Joint Railway (SDJR) to carry its line from Evercreech to the south, through the Mendip Hills, towards Bath. It crosses the River Sheppey at the north-eastern edge of Shepton Mallet, where the railway curves around a patch of high ground. The bridge was built in locally mined grey limestone and originally carried a single track. The line was double-tracked in 1894 and the viaduct was widened with blue brick and faced with stone.

The line closed in 1966 as a result of the Beeching cuts. The viaduct is a Grade II* listed building, first listed on 20 May 1952, a status which provides legal protection from demolition. In 2023, a scheme was approved to turn part of the SDJR route into a walking and cycling trail, including the nearby Ham Wood Viaduct and Bath Road Viaduct and Windsor Hill Tunnel. The promoters of the scheme hoped to extend it to Shepton Mallet via Charlton Viaduct in a later phase.

== Design ==
The viaduct is 317 yards (290 metres). It consists of 27 segmental arches each of which has a span of 28 feet (8.5 metres) and with a maximum height of 45 feet (14 metres). It is on a curve of 30 chains (600 m) radius falling at 1 in 55 from each end to the midpoint. To cope with the curve the arches are strengthened by buttresses at every third pier. The arch barrels and piers are in brick but faced in masonry. The spandrels, and parapets are entirely in masonry.

The viaduct is one of seven on the route, all built to a similar specification. The next structure on the line, the Bath Road Viaduct, is particularly similar and is also a listed building. The Bath Road Viaduct is taller but only has six arches to Charlton's twenty-seven.

The viaduct can be seen from the grounds of Kilver Court where it forms a feature.

== See also ==
- Grade II* listed buildings in Mendip
