= James Somerville =

Royal Navy admiral (1882–1949)

Admiral of the Fleet Sir James Somerville GCB GBE DSO
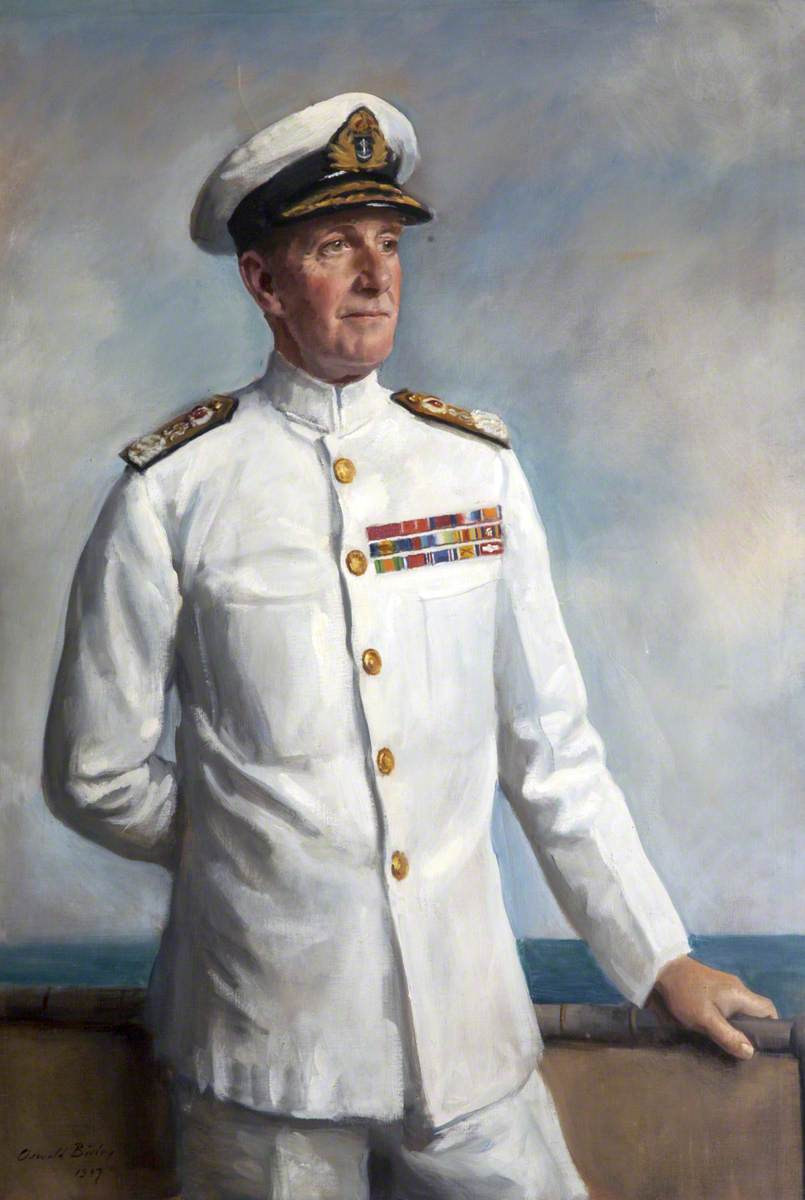
- Somerville in 1947, by Oswald Birley
- Born: 17 July 1882; Weybridge, Surrey
- Died: 19 March 1949 (aged 66); Dinder House, Somerset
- Burial place: St Michael and All Angels Church, Dinder
- Military career
- Allegiance: United Kingdom
- Branch: Royal Navy
- Service years: 1897–1946
- Rank: Admiral of the Fleet
- Commands: Eastern Fleet (1942–44); Force H (1940–42); Battlecruiser Squadron (1940); East Indies Station (1938–39); Destroyer Flotillas, Mediterranean Fleet (1936–38); HMS Norfolk (1931–32); HMS Barham (1927–29); HMS Warspite (1927); HMS Benbow (1922–23)
- Conflicts: First World War; Gallipoli Campaign; Second World War; Attack on Mers-el-Kébir; Battle of Cape Spartivento; Operation Grog; Hunt for Bismarck; Indian Ocean raid; Operation Cockpit; Operation Transom
- Awards: Knight Grand Cross of the Order of the Bath; Knight Grand Cross of the Order of the British Empire; Distinguished Service Order; Mentioned in Despatches (2); Knight Grand Cross of the Order of Orange-Nassau (Netherlands); Commander of the Legion of Merit (United States)

Admiral of the Fleet Sir James Fownes Somerville (17 July 1882 – 19 March 1949) was a Royal Navy admiral. He served in the First World War as fleet wireless officer for the Mediterranean Fleet where he was involved in providing naval support for the Gallipoli Campaign. He also served in the Second World War as commander of the newly formed Force H: after the French armistice with Germany, Winston Churchill gave Somerville and Force H the task of neutralising the main element of the French battle fleet, then at Mers El Kébir in Algeria. After he had destroyed the French Battle fleet, Somerville played an important role in the pursuit and sinking of the German battleship Bismarck.

Somerville later became Commander-in-Chief, Eastern Fleet. In April 1942 Admiral Chūichi Nagumo's powerful Indian Ocean raid inflicted heavy losses on his fleet. However, in spring 1944, with reinforcements, Somerville was able to go on the offensive in a series of aggressive air strikes in the Japanese-occupied Dutch East Indies. He spent the remainder of the war in charge of the British naval delegation in Washington, D.C.

== Early life and family ==
Somerville was born on 17 July 1882, the second son of Arthur Fownes Somerville, of Dinder House, Somerset, and his wife Ellen Somerville (née Sharland, daughter of William Stanley Sharland of New Norfolk, Tasmania). His father had studied at Trinity Hall, Cambridge, was called to the bar as a barrister in 1875 and had then become recorder of Wells, Somerset in 1916. Later he was President of the Somerset Archaeological Society. Somerville was descended in the male-line from the Fownes family of Nethway and Kittery Court, his ancestors being John Fownes the younger and John Fownes the elder were Members of Parliament for Dartmouth in the early eighteenth century and another ancestor went on to marry an heiress of the Somerville family of Dinder House, changing their surname to Somerville in 1831 in honour of this connection. Through his paternal grandmother, he was descended from the Hood family, which had a long tradition of naval service and which counted as members Vice Admiral Sir Samuel Hood, 1st Baronet, and Admiral Samuel Hood, 1st Viscount Hood.

In 1913, Somerville married Mary Main; they had a daughter and a son. His son Lieutenant-Commander John Arthur Fownes Somerville, CB, CBE served in the Royal Navy and became the deputy director of GCHQ. The news reader Julia Somerville is one of their granddaughters.

== Naval career ==
=== Early career ===
Somerville joined the training ship HMS Britannia as a cadet on 15 January 1897 and served as midshipman in the cruiser HMS Royal Arthur in the Channel Fleet and then in the cruiser HMS Warspite on the Pacific Station. He was promoted to sub-lieutenant on 15 December 1901 and to lieutenant on 15 March 1904 before joining the armoured cruiser HMS Sutlej on the China Station. He attended the torpedo school HMS Vernon in 1907 and then remained there to work on the development of wireless telegraphy.

Somerville served in the Royal Navy in the First World War, initially as a wireless officer in the battleship HMS Marlborough in the Grand Fleet and then as fleet wireless officer for the Mediterranean Fleet serving in the battleship HMS Queen Elizabeth, then the battlecruiser HMS Inflexible and then the cruiser HMS Chatham. In HMS Chatham he was involved in providing naval support for the Gallipoli Campaign. He was promoted to commander on 31 December 1915, and awarded the Distinguished Service Order and Mentioned in Despatches on 14 March 1916. He transferred to the battleship HMS King George V in the Grand Fleet in January 1917 and then joined the signals school at Portsmouth at the end of the year.

Somerville stayed in the service after the war, becoming Executive Officer in the battleship HMS Ajax in the Mediterranean Fleet in March 1920 and then Executive Officer in the battleship HMS Emperor of India also in the Mediterranean Fleet. Promoted to captain on 31 December 1921, he joined the Admiralty as Deputy Director of Signals in early 1922, before becoming Flag Captain to Sir John Kelly, commanding the 4th Battle Squadron, in the battleship HMS Benbow in August 1922. He returned to the Admiralty as Director of Signals in February 1925 before becoming Flag Captain to Sir John Kelly in his new role as Commander of the 1st Battle Squadron in early 1927, first in the battleship HMS Warspite and then, after the Warspite struck a rock, in the battleship HMS Barham. He joined the directing staff at the Imperial Defence College in 1929 and became commanding officer of the cruiser HMS Norfolk in the Home Fleet in December 1931. Promoted to commodore on 14 October 1932, he became commander of the Royal Navy Barracks at Portsmouth later that month and then, after promotion to rear admiral on 12 October 1933, he became Director of Personnel Services at the Admiralty in May 1934. As Director of Personnel Services he introduced a seaman's welfare scheme following the Invergordon Mutiny. He was appointed a Companion of the Order of the Bath on 1 January 1935.

Somerville became Flag Officer Destroyers in the Mediterranean Fleet in March 1936 and during the Spanish Civil War commanded an international force in the area of Majorca when Palma was threatened with bombardment by Republican forces. Promoted to vice admiral on 11 September 1937, he became Commander-in-Chief, East Indies, with his flag in the cruiser HMS Norfolk in July 1938. He retired with suspected tuberculosis in early 1939 but was still advanced to Knight Commander of the Order of the Bath on 8 June 1939.

=== European operations, 1939–1942 ===
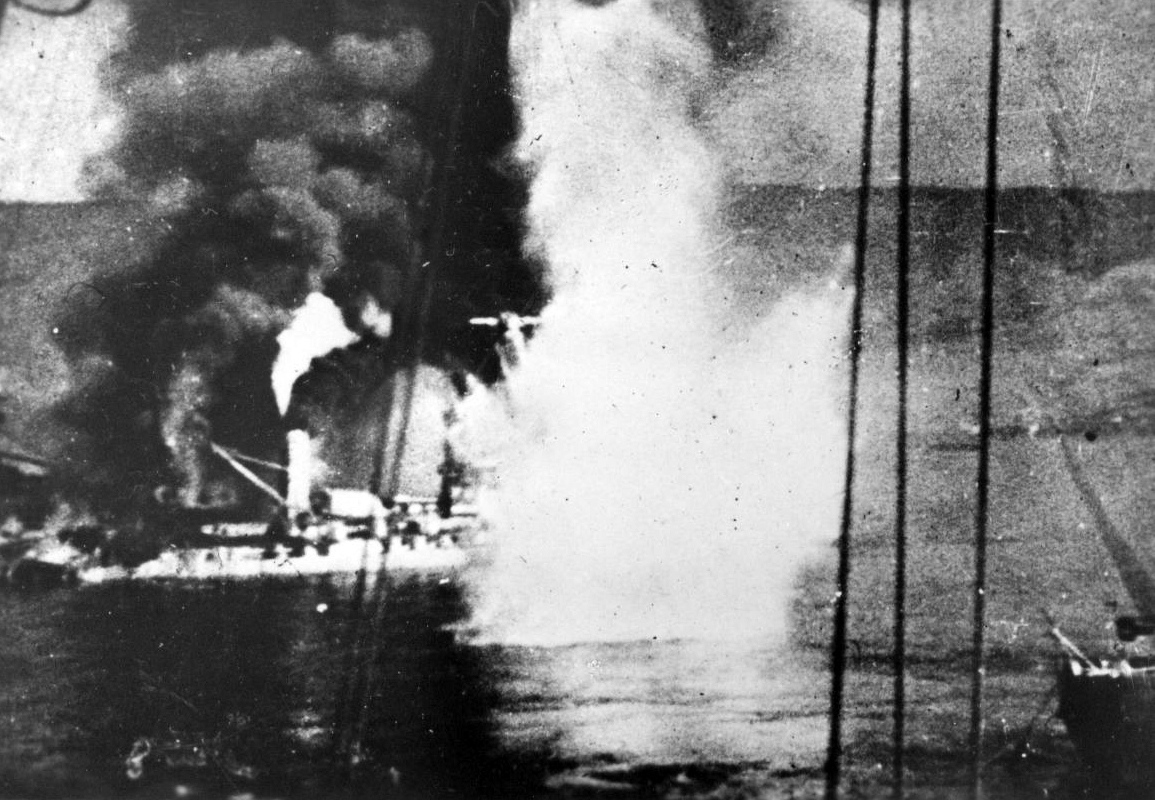
The sinking of the French battleship Bretagne at Mers El Kébir

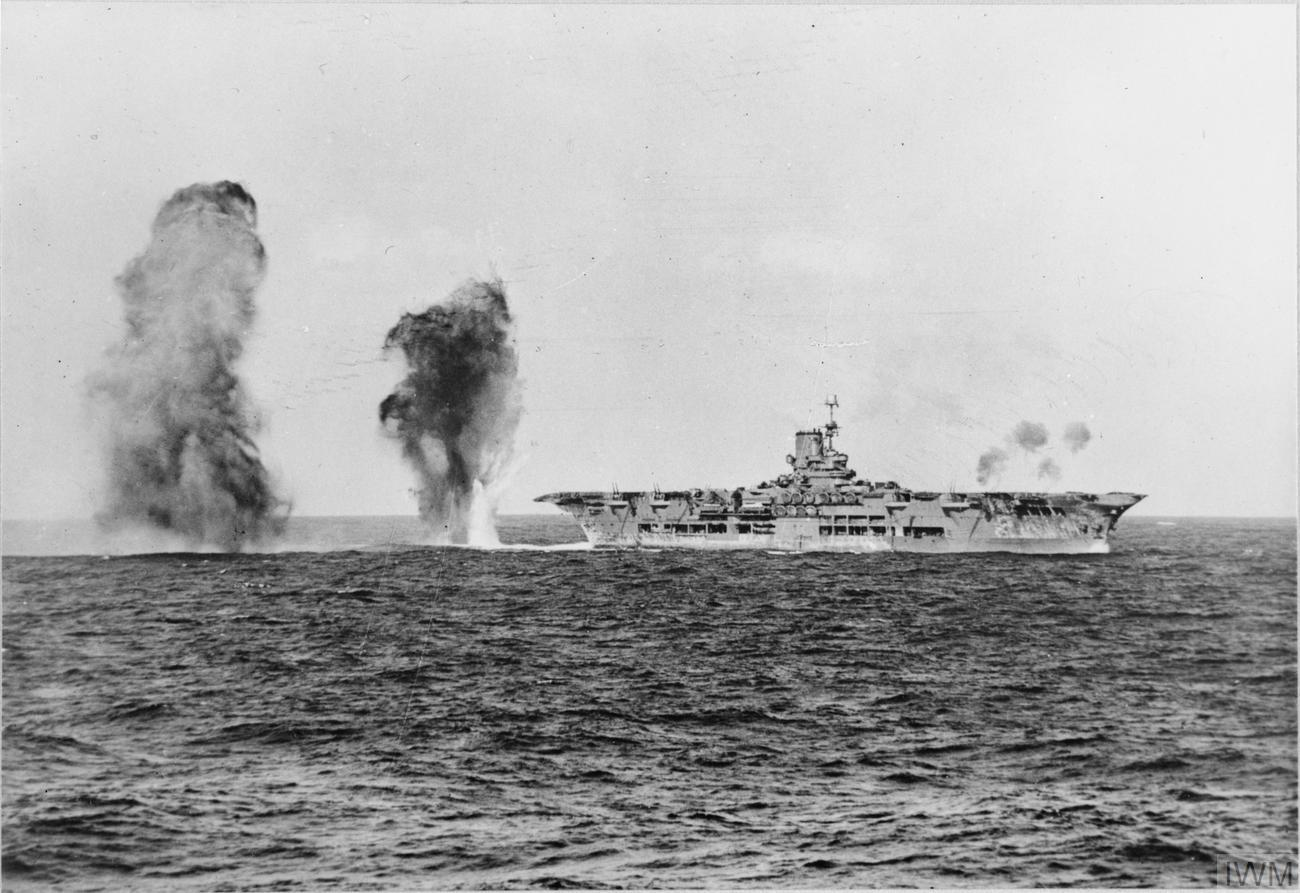
The aircraft carrier HMS Ark Royal during the Battle of Cape Spartivento

With the approach of the Second World War, Somerville was recalled to duty on special service to the Admiralty later in 1939 and performed work on naval radar development. In May 1940, Somerville served under Admiral Sir Bertram Ramsay, helping organize the Dunkirk evacuation. His next major assignment was as commander of the newly formed Force H based in Gibraltar, with his flag in the battlecruiser HMS Hood. After the French armistice with Germany on 22 June 1940, Winston Churchill gave Somerville and Force H the task of neutralizing the main element of the French battle fleet, then at Mers El Kébir in Algeria. They were to attack and destroy the French ships if all other options failed. Churchill wrote to him:

You are charged with one of the most disagreeable tasks that a British Admiral has ever been faced with, but we have complete confidence in you and rely on you to carry it out relentlessly.

Although Somerville privately felt that such an attack would be a mistake, he carried out his orders. The French refused to comply with British conditions and so on 3 July 1940, Force H attacked French ships at Mers-el-Kébir. Somerville's forces inflicted severe damage on their erstwhile allies, most notably sinking the battleship Bretagne with heavy loss of life. Several other major French ships were damaged during the bombardment. The operation was judged a success, but he admitted privately to his wife that he had not been quite as aggressive in the destruction as he could have been. He was Mentioned in Despatches on 16 August 1940.

Somerville transferred his flag to the battlecruiser HMS Renown in August 1940 and led the British forces in the Battle of Cape Spartivento in November; Churchill was outraged at Somerville for not continuing the pursuit of the Italian Navy after that battle and dispatched the Earl of Cork to conduct an inquiry, but Cork found that Somerville had acted entirely appropriately. Force H bombarded Genoa on 9 February 1941, and Somerville, still in HMS Renown in May 1941, also played an important role in the pursuit and sinking of the German battleship Bismarck later that month. Somerville transferred his flag to the battleship HMS Nelson in August 1941 and also played a major role in protecting Malta from enemy attack in autumn 1941. He transferred his flag to the battleship HMS Rodney and then to the battleship HMS Malaya. He was appointed a Knight Commander of the Order of the British Empire for his service with Force H on 21 October 1941.

=== Indian Ocean, 1942–1944 ===
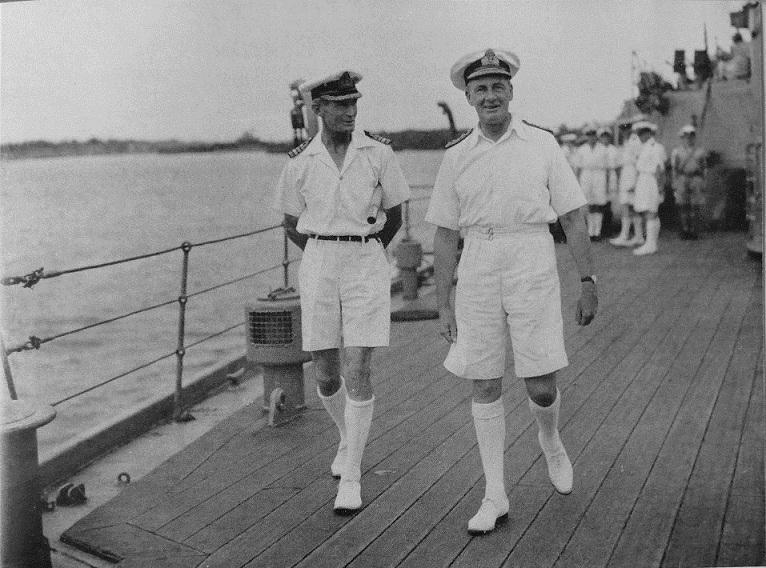
Somerville as Commander-in-Chief, Eastern Fleet with Captain G.N. Oliver on board HMS Warspite

Somerville became Commander-in-Chief, Eastern Fleet, with his flag in the battleship HMS Warspite in March 1942 and was promoted to full admiral on 6 April 1942. Following the fall of Singapore and the Indian Ocean Raid, Somerville transferred his fleet headquarters from Trincomalee in Ceylon to Kilindini in Kenya. In April 1942 Admiral Chūichi Nagumo's powerful 1st Air Fleet (Kidō Butai) centered around five fleet carriers launched the Indian Ocean raid that inflicted heavy losses on Somerville's fleet including a light aircraft carrier, two heavy cruisers, two destroyers, one corvette, five other vessels, and 45 aircraft. The damage inflicted upon Royal Navy and allied Commonwealth forces in the Indian Ocean was nonetheless minimized, being forewarned by intelligence so their heavy units sailed from their bases prior to the Japanese air attacks. Somerville avoided a direct confrontation with the Imperial Japanese Navy, preserving the Eastern Fleet's two fleet carriers and one battleship.

For most of the rest of 1942, Somerville's fleet avoided any major operations against the Japanese, barring a brief sortie into the Bay of Bengal in late July and early August 1942 during which he turned back after being spotted by a Japanese flying boat on 2 August 1942. Somerville's unwillingness to risk his ships in a diversionary attack against the Japanese in Southeast Asia during mid- and late 1942, which he saw as necessary to preserve its precariously limited strength and its ability to guard merchant convoys in the Indian Ocean, was met with derision by US Chief of Naval Operations Admiral Ernest J. King, as King believed that the Eastern Fleet doing so would greatly assist the Americans in their own operations against the Japanese as they clashed at the Battles of the Coral Sea and Midway and throughout the Guadalcanal campaign.

In Spring 1944, with reinforcements, Somerville was able to go on the offensive in a series of aggressive air strikes in the Japanese-occupied Dutch East Indies: these included attacks on Sabang in April and May 1944 and on Surabaya in May 1944. He was also advanced to Knight Grand Cross of the Order of the Bath on 22 August 1944.

=== Later career ===
Somerville was placed in charge of the British naval delegation in Washington, D.C. in October 1944 where he managed to get on very well with the anti-British Admiral Ernest King, the United States' Chief of Naval Operations. He became Deputy Lieutenant of Somerset on 8 November 1944, was promoted to Admiral of the Fleet on 8 May 1945 and was advanced to Knight Grand Cross of the Order of the British Empire on 1 January 1946. He was also appointed a Knight Grand Cross of the Order of Orange-Nassau by the Netherlands government and a Commander of the Legion of Merit by the United States.

== Later life ==
In retirement Somerville became Lord Lieutenant of Somerset in August 1946 and was appointed a Knight of the Venerable Order of the Hospital of St John of Jerusalem on 23 December 1946. He lived at the family seat of Dinder House in Somerset where he died of coronary thrombosis on 19 March 1949. His body was buried in the churchyard of St Michael and All Angels Church at Dinder.

== Cited sources ==
- Fox-Davies, Arthur Charles (1905). Armorial Families. London: Hurst & Blackett.
- Heathcote, Tony (2002). The British Admirals of the Fleet 1734–1995. Pen & Sword Ltd. ISBN 0-85052-835-6.
- Holland, James (2011). The Battle of Britain. Corgi. ISBN 978-0552156103.
- Morris, Oswald (2006). Huston, We Have a Problem: A Kaleidoscope of Filmmaking Memories. Rowman & Littlefield Education. ISBN 978-0810857063.
- Venn, J. A. (1944). Alumni Cantabrigienses, part ii, volume ii. University of Cambridge.
- Venn, J. A. (1953). Alumni Cantabrigienses, part ii, volume v. University of Cambridge.

Military offices
Preceded by Sir Alexander Ramsay	Commander-in-Chief, East Indies; 1938–1939	Succeeded by Sir Ralph Leatham
Preceded by Sir William Whitworth	Commander, Battlecruiser Squadron; 1940	Succeeded by Sir William Whitworth
Preceded by Sir Geoffrey Layton	Commander-in-Chief, Eastern Fleet; 1942–1944	Succeeded by Sir Bruce Fraser
Honorary titles
Preceded by The Marquess of Bath	Lord Lieutenant of Somerset; 1946–1949	Succeeded by The Lord Hylton
