= Julia Somerville =

British newsreader and reporter (born 1947)

Julia Somerville OBE
- Born: Julia Mary Fownes Somerville; 14 July 1947 (age 79); Wells, Somerset, England
- Occupations: Journalist, newsreader
- Years active: 1972–present
- Notable credit(s): BBC Nine O'Clock News; ITV Lunchtime News; ITV News at Ten; Rip Off Britain
- Spouses: Stephen Band (m. 1970–1975) Ray Gowdridge (m. 1984–1992)
- Partner: Jeremy Dixon
- Children: 2

Julia Mary Fownes Somerville OBE (born 14 July 1947) is an English consumer affairs journalist co-presenting the BBC One daytime television programme Rip Off Britain. She began her journalistic career with magazine publisher IPC and edited a computer group house magazine ITT Creed.

She moved into broadcast newsreading and reporting, starting in radio and eventually moving to television where she was known, for many years, as a television newsreader and reporter for the BBC and Independent Television News (ITN). Somerville joined the BBC as a radio news sub-editor in 1972 and became Labour Affairs correspondent for BBC Radio 4 in 1981 before co-presenting the BBC Nine O'Clock News bulletin from 1984 to 1987.

She joined ITN in 1987 as the reader of the ITN News at 12:30 lunchtime bulletin before becoming a co-presenter of News at Ten in 1989. Somerville co-presented News at Ten's short-lived analyst segment Focus on Britain in late 1992 until it was dropped from the bulletin. She presented the Yorkshire Television current affairs programme 3D from 1993 to 1998. Somerville left ITN in 2001 and rejoined the BBC in 2010 and began co-presenting Rip Off Britain.

== Early life and education ==
Somerville was born in Wells, Somerset, the granddaughter of Admiral of the Fleet Sir James Fownes Somerville (1882–1949) of Dinder House in Somerset. Her father, John Arthur Fownes Somerville, was a naval officer who later rose to be deputy director of GCHQ. She was educated at Airthrie Preparatory School in Cheltenham and Headington School in Oxford, graduating from the University of Sussex with a Bachelor of Arts degree in English literature in 1969.

== Career ==
After graduation, Somerville joined magazine publisher IPC to begin her career in journalism and did a training course, working on Homes & Gardens magazine, a Women's Journal, the PR section of Woman's Own. Then from 1970 to 1972 she was editor of the computer group house magazine ITT Creed.

Somerville joined the BBC in 1972 as a sub-editor in the radio newsroom, and then became a reporter in 1978. In 1981, she became Labour Affairs correspondent on BBC Radio 4 and joined BBC Television News in 1984, doing a brief stint on Nationwide and co-presenting the BBC Nine O'Clock News. She passed a film test and began an intensive news reading course at BBC Television Centre to replace Sue Lawley, before starting work in July 1984. When the Nine O'Clock News was revamped as a two-presenter bulletin on 2 September 1985, Somerville co-presented the programme with either John Humphrys or Andrew Harvey. During the 1987 United Kingdom general election campaign, she presented a round-up of the campaign trail in the BBC 2 programme On The Hustings. Somerville made her final appearance presenting the Nine O'Clock News on 14 August 1987.

She moved to Independent Television News (ITN) in Autumn 1987, where she presented the relaunched ITN News at 12:30 lunchtime bulletin as its sole presenter when ITV move the bulletin up by half an hour to accommodate the network's new programming for the autumn. Somerville cited the chance to provide breaking news and live interviews to viewers. She reviewed the preceding 12 months of the activities of the British royal family in The Royal Year in December 1987. Somerville went on maternity leave in mid-1988 and was replaced at ITN by Jon Snow until she returned to work in October 1988.

She moved in April 1989 to be one of the co-presenters on News at Ten alongside Alastair Burnet and Sandy Gall. In November 1989, Somerville became a supporter of the Pre-School Playgroups Association to help mothers with their young children throughout the 1990s. She interviewed politicians during ITN's coverage of the 1990 United Kingdom budget, and analysed ITN's exit poll for its coverage of the 1992 United Kingdom general election.

Somerville was diagnosed with a benign brain tumour in August 1992 and after neurosurgery recovered well to return to work three months later. during this time Somerville asked ITN to lower her profile because of media intrusion into her personal life. She would instead read the Sunday evening news bulletin from late 1992, and co-presented the Focus on Britain analysis segment broadcast three times a week on News at Ten until it was dropped by ITN in December 1992 following heavy criticism.

She returned full time to co-presented the Lunchtime News plus 3D, a weekly Yorkshire Television current affairs programme from 1993 to 1998. Somerville reported on the political response to the 1993 United Kingdom budget, and narrated the six-part documentary series Special Babies about the Maternity and Special Care Baby Unit at Watford General Hospital in 1994. She reported from Hyde Park during the funeral of Diana, Princess of Wales in September 1997. Somerville also provided cover for News at Ten, and was one of the launch anchors for the ITN News Channel.

Between 1999 and 2001, Somerville presented the daily LBC radio show London Life, a two-hour programme devoted to interviews with diverse artists. Following Somerville being dropped from her prime time role to younger woman newsreaders and being limited to presenting a daily radio programme, she left ITN in October 2001.

Somerville has a lifelong interest in painting and in 2001 was a member of the judging panel for the National Portrait Gallery's BP Portrait of the Year; she has also served as a judge for several years on the Royal Institute of British Architects Annual Architecture Award Panels. On 18 September 2003, Somerville was appointed Chair of the Advisory Committee of the Government Art Collection, for a period of four years.

As part of ITN's "Famous Five" with Gordon Honeycombe, Martyn Lewis, Selina Scott and Anna Ford, Somerville was brought back to the screen for one week in September 2005 for ITN's 50th anniversary. In 2010, Somerville returned to television news as a presenter on BBC News. Also in 2010, Somerville was the narrator of the experimental film Facade by artist and filmmaker Phil Coy. Somerville joined Rip Off Britain when the show returned in Autumn 2011 for its third series. She replaced Jennie Bond to host along with Angela Rippon and Gloria Hunniford. Together, they also presented Charlie's Consumer Angels. In August 2017, Somerville was a contestant on Celebrity MasterChef on BBC One.

== Personal life ==
Somerville has been married twice, to Stephen Band (1970–1975) and to BBC Radio Foreign Service journalist Ray Gowdridge (1984–1992). She is currently the partner of the architect Jeremy Dixon. Somerville has two children with Gowdridge. She was appointed Officer of the Order of the British Empire in the 2013 Birthday Honours "for services to art."

She suffered a brain tumour in 1992, for which she successfully underwent neurosurgery. As a result, Somerville agreed to become a patron of the Different Strokes charity.

=== Allegations ===
In 1995, Somerville and Dixon were arrested by the Metropolitan Police after sending photos to be printed at a branch of the pharmacy Boots in London. One photograph involved Somerville's seven year old daughter naked in a bathtub. When Dixon arrived at Boots to collect the prints the police were waiting and later his and Somerville's house was searched but nothing was seized. Both suspects were placed on police bail pending further enquiries; later the allegations were dropped.

=== Stalkers ===
In August 2001, 47-year-old David Hughes of north London was convicted of harassment after sending 390 obscene letters and specifically moving close to Somerville over a 12-year period. Hughes was found guilty of one charge under Section Two of the Harassment Act, and the judge made a hospital order under the Mental Health Act 1983. Deputy District Judge Javaid Azam subsequently issued an indefinite restraining order banning Hughes from ever contacting the journalist again. It also became known that, in 1995, Somerville took out a court injunction to stop sound engineer Geoffrey Brewis contacting her. She said he had visited her home, followed her and made nuisance phone calls.
