= Roger Saul =

British businessman (born 1950)

- Born: July 1950 (age 75); Lottisham, Somerset, England
- Education: Wells Cathedral School; Kingswood School
- Occupation: Businessman
- Known for: founder of the Mulberry fashion label
- Spouse: Monty
- Children: 3

Roger John Saul (born July 1950) is a British businessman, the founder of the Mulberry fashion label.

== Early life and education ==
Roger John Saul was born in July 1950, in Lottisham, Somerset. His father worked for Clarks Shoes in Street, Somerset. He was educated at Wells Cathedral School, followed by Kingswood School in Bath.

== Career ==
He won a scholarship to study business at Westminster College in London and worked as a trainee buyer for John Michael, the 1960s Carnaby Street fashion innovator.

Saul founded Mulberry in 1971 with his mother Joan, but was ousted in 2002.

Saul owns the 300-acre Sharpham Park estate organic farm and the Kilver Court shopping centre, in Shepton Mallet, Somerset.

Sharpham Park produces 500 tonnes of organic spelt a year, and supplies Waitrose, Ocado and Whole Foods.

== Personal life ==
He is married to Monty, a former Dior model, and they met at a Paris fashion show. They have three sons together, William, Cameron, and Freddie.
