= The Old Rectory, Croscombe =

The Old Rectory
- Location within Somerset
- 51°11′46″N 2°35′09″W
- Location: Croscombe, Somerset, England

History
- Built: 17th century

Listed Building – Grade II
- Designated: 17 October 1985
- Reference no.: 1058829

The Old Rectory in the village of Croscombe within the English county of Somerset was built in the 17th century and rebuilt in the 18th. It is a Grade II listed building.

The two storey house has a slate roof. The door has a triglyph frieze with a paterae and cornice on twin Tuscan pilasters. It has four bedrooms and three bathrooms. It is surrounded by gardens separated from the road by walls.

The house was sold for £755,000 in 2007, when it was seen as being "unsuitable for the clergy".

In 2014 it was announced by the Church Commissioners that the house would be purchased, for £900,000 as a residence for Peter Hancock the incoming Bishop of Bath and Wells as an alternative to living at the traditional Bishop's Palace in Wells, to provide him with more privacy. The controversial decision was opposed by local clergy and residents, who criticised the lack of consultation. The decision was later reversed after a committee appointed by the Archbishops' Council ruled that the Bishop should continue to live at the Palace in Wells.
