= Shepton Mallet Digital Arts Festival =

Arts festival in Shepton Mallet, Somerset, England

The Shepton Mallet Digital Arts Festival (also known as the Shepton Digi Fest) is a British annual public arts festival and creative industry showcase based in the Somerset town of Shepton Mallet at venues including Kilver Court.

The Festival was founded in 2009 and marked its third year with a three-day programme of events from 6 to 8 October 2011.

The 2011 festival featured contributions from Merlin Crossingham, the creative director of Aardman Animation's Wallace and Gromit, Aardman model maker Jim Parkyn, film composer William Goodchild, Natural History film-maker Paul Appleby, Icon Film's Dominic Weston and camera workshops from award-winning director of photography Jeremy Humphries.

The festival describes itself as "The South West Showcase of New Film, Photography & Performance" and states its aims as connecting young talent in the digital arts with established businesses and professionals and showcasing digital creative talent in the whole of the South West, including Bristol and Bath.

2011 also saw the festival's first engagement with the gaming industry, linking up with Edinburgh Interactive and Sean Dromgoole of industry research company GameVision.

The festival is non-profit, and is supported by the Arts Council; The Open Innovation partners South West One, IBM, Plymouth University and Somerset County Council; Shepton Mallet Town Council and a number of other public and industry bodies.
