= Dinder =

Village in Somerset, England

Coordinates: 51.199351°N 2.607506°W

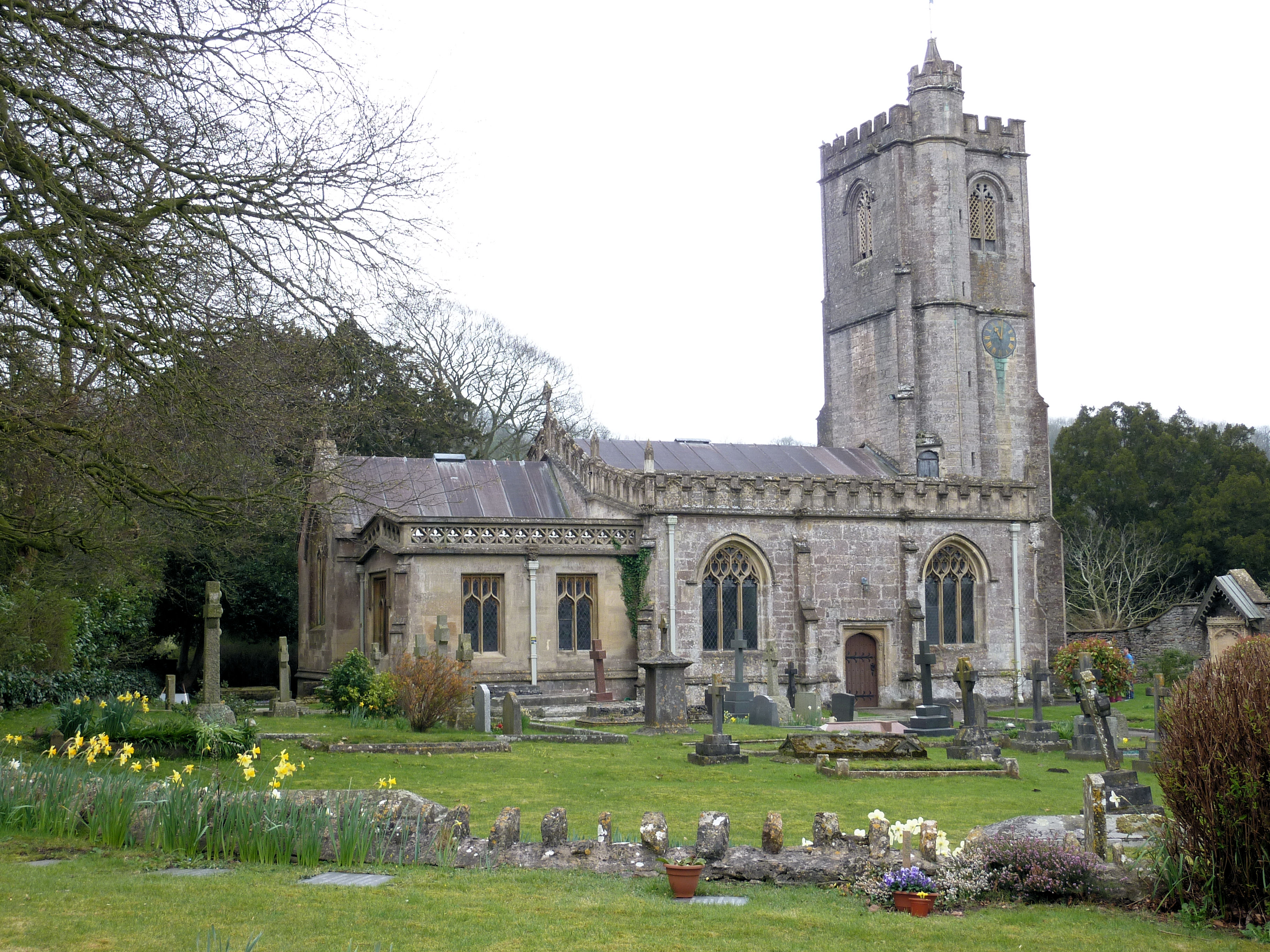
- St Michael and All Angels, Dinder

- Location within Somerset
- OS grid reference: ST576446
- Civil parish: St Cuthbert Out
- Unitary authority: Somerset Council
- Ceremonial county: Somerset
- Region: South West
- Country: England
- Sovereign state: United Kingdom
- Post town: WELLS
- Postcode district: BA5
- Dialling code: 01749
- Police: Avon and Somerset
- Fire: Devon and Somerset
- Ambulance: South Western
- UK Parliament: Wells and Mendip Hills

Dinder (which means 'the house in the valley') is a small village and former civil parish, now in the parish of St Cuthbert Out, in the Somerset district, in the ceremonial county of Somerset. It is 2 1/2 miles west of Shepton Mallet, and 2 miles east of Wells. In 1961 the parish had a population of 198.

The river Sheppey runs alongside the main street of the village.

== History ==
The manor containing the village formed part of the endowment of the bishopric of Wells, which is located only 2 miles north-west of the village. By the 12th century it had been granted to William Fitzjohn, whose descendants were known as Harptree or Flemining. By 1327, the manor was owned by a Richard de Rodney, whose family retained possession until it was sold in the mid 17th century to Richard Hickes, through whose descendants it passed to the Somerville family who built Dinder House and whose most famous member, Admiral James Somerville, was in charge of the British naval force which sank the French fleet at Oran in 1940.

The parish was part of the hundred of Wells Forum. In 1894 under the Local Government Act 1894, A.F.Somerville was elected as first councillor for the parish for Wells Rural District, but there was no election for parish council as parishes of under 300 inhabitants were not obliged to elect one. On 1 April 1986 the parish was abolished and merged with St. Cuthbert Out.

== Buildings ==
The Anglican Church of St Michael is of Norman origins and has been designated by English Heritage as a Grade II* listed building. It includes nave, chancel, north aisle, porch, and square tower. Within the church are an ornamental font and stone pulpit, with some monuments to the Somerville family. A cross in the churchyard dates back to the 14th century.

Dinder House is a small country house in landscaped grounds. It was built in 1799–1801, possibly by Nicholls of Bath. The outer bays were added around 1850 by Vulliany, and a further single-storey addition to the north dates from 1929. The gate piers, quadrant walls and flanking piers include panelled central piers with pagodal caps, and one with iron lamp at its apex. A bridge over the River Sheppey predates the house.

Several other buildings in the village are also of historic interest including Church View Cottage, which dates from the 16th century, the 18th-century Road View and Downside House and Wistaria House.

== Notable residents and culture ==
The crest of the Somerville family (Admiral of the Fleet James Somerville, author and poet Christopher Somerville and newsreader Julia Somerville) features a dragon and wheel.

Reverend Charles Woodmason (ca. 1720–March 1789), author, poet, Anglican clergyman, American loyalist, and West Gallery psalmodist, who is best remembered for his journal documenting life on the South Carolina frontier in the late 1760s and for his role as a leader of the South Carolina Regulator movement, served as curate of St. Michael and All Angels Parish from at least February 1776 through December 1777. Extracts of some of the sermons he preached at Dinder are in Richard Hooker's volume on Woodmason.

== Dinder Worm ==
The legend of the Dragon of Dinder goes back for centuries, and is recorded in a fifteenth-century copy of Ranulf Higden's Polychronicon, now Eton College Library, MS 213. The legend goes that a terrible Dragon was terrorising both livestock and villagers. The then Bishop Jocelin was called upon to save the people of Dinder. He rode out with his men at arms, but at the last furlong commanded them to remain at a distance while he rode on and single-handedly beheaded the beast. The legend of the Dragon of Dinder lives on. Every 50 years since then a celebration of the slaying of the Dragon has been held. The legend says that should this tradition be forgotten and the slaying not re-enacted by a left-handed man of the cloth the Dragon may return. There is a Mosaic depicting the story made by the children of nearby Wells and Dinder set in stone on the perimeter walk of the Bishop's Palace. Nearby hamlet, Worminster and the hill Worminster Sleight are likely named after this legend and the Old English word for a dragon, "worm".
