= Croscombe =

Village and civil parish in Somerset, England

Coordinates: 51°11′54″N 2°34′44″W

- Village and civil parish
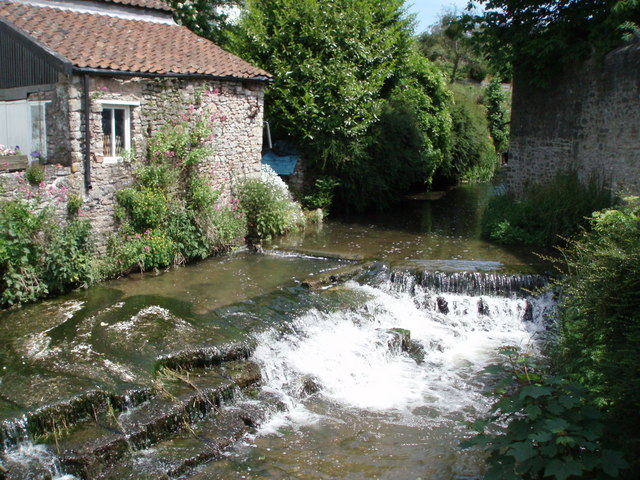
- The course of the River Sheppey has been substantially 'managed' on its way through Croscombe, as this weir area demonstrates. The Sheppey was the main power source for many of the mills which operated in Croscombe in the 18th and 19th centuries.

- Location within Somerset
- Population: 603 (2011)
- OS grid reference: ST595445
- Unitary authority: Somerset Council
- Ceremonial county: Somerset
- Region: South West
- Country: England
- Sovereign state: United Kingdom
- Post town: WELLS
- Postcode district: BA5
- Dialling code: 01749
- Police: Avon and Somerset
- Fire: Devon and Somerset
- Ambulance: South Western
- UK Parliament: Wells and Mendip Hills

Croscombe is a village and civil parish 2 miles (3 km) west of Shepton Mallet and 4 miles (6 km) from Wells, in the county of Somerset, England. It is situated on the A371 road in the valley of the River Sheppey.

Croscombe has a village hall, a shop, a public house, a Church, a chapel and a school.

== History ==
North-east of the village and within the parish boundary is Maesbury Castle, an Iron Age hill fort.

It was first recorded in 706 when King Ine of Wessex referred to the village as Correges Cumb. The parish of Croscombe was part of the Whitstone Hundred. Croscombe emerged in the 16th and 17th centuries with a boom in the wool trade. During this period many houses, cottages and hostelries were built and the church was reconstructed.

During the Industrial Revolution, silk, mining, quarrying and milling replaced the wool trade. In 1848 the River Sheppey powered two mills for grinding corn, one for winding silk, and another used as a stocking manufactory.

The Old Manor was built around 1460–89 as a rectorial manor house for Hugh Sugar, the Treasurer of Wells Cathedral. It was altered in the 16th and 18th centuries, and in the 20th century by the Landmark Trust. It has been designated as a Grade I listed building.

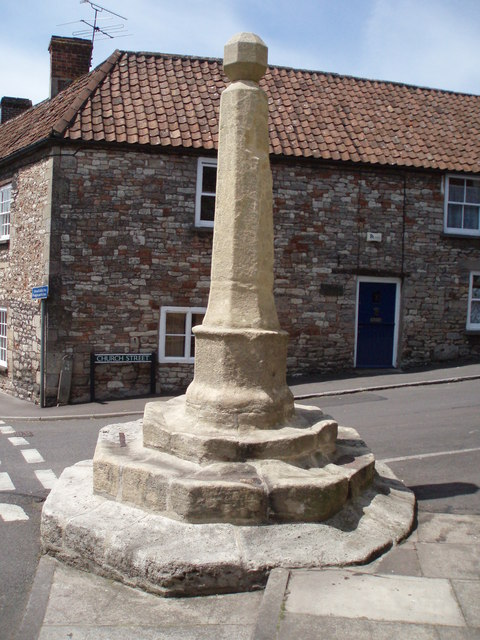
Village cross

The village cross was put in place in the 19th century, replacing an older one which had been there since the 14th century. It is heavily weathered (the rock type is oolite - a soft limestone), especially on the front right where it served as a seat for patrons of the adjacent former public house now known as The Cross bed and breakfast.

In August 1861 the local waywardens decided that the village cross was a hindrance to the public way and endeavoured to remove it. The villagers were much against this and when masons from a neighbouring city began the act of despoiling it, the villagers gathered around the cross in its defence and a mêlée ensued involving both men and women inhabitants. The demolishing party were eventually driven off but not before the shaft had been broken and its finial broken in two. A flag was hoisted by the villagers bearing upon it the legend "Be Faithful" . During that night around 30 villagers volunteered to bivouac around the cross to guard it during the night. No other attempt has been made to remove the cross since.

The village's remaining public house is The George Inn.

== Governance ==
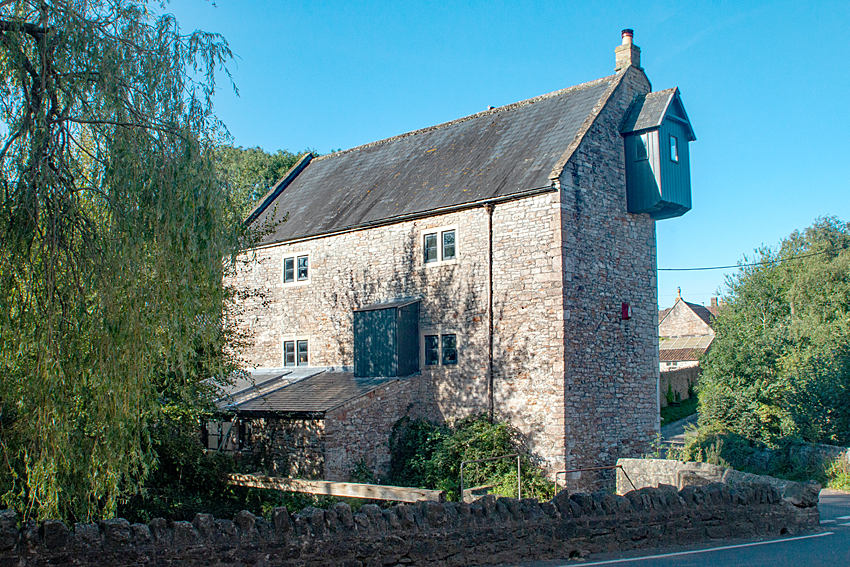
Higher Mill, Croscombe

The parish council has responsibility for local issues, including setting an annual precept (local rate) to cover the council’s operating costs and producing annual accounts for public scrutiny. The parish council evaluates local planning applications and works with the local police, district council officers, and neighbourhood watch groups on matters of crime, security, and traffic. The parish council's role also includes initiating projects for the maintenance and repair of parish facilities, as well as consulting with the district council on the maintenance, repair, and improvement of highways, drainage, footpaths, public transport, and street cleaning. Conservation matters (including trees and listed buildings) and environmental issues are also the responsibility of the council.

For local government purposes, since 1 April 2023, the parish comes under the unitary authority of Somerset Council. Prior to this, it was part of the non-metropolitan district of Mendip (established under the Local Government Act 1972). It was part of Wells Rural District before 1974.

The village falls in the 'Croscombe and Pilton' electoral ward. The ward stretches from Croscombe in the north east to Pilton in the south. North Wootton is also included. The total parish population at the 2011 census was 2,284.

It is also part of the Wells and Mendip Hills county constituency represented in the House of Commons of the Parliament of the United Kingdom. It elects one Member of Parliament (MP) by the first-past-the-post system of election.

== Religious sites ==
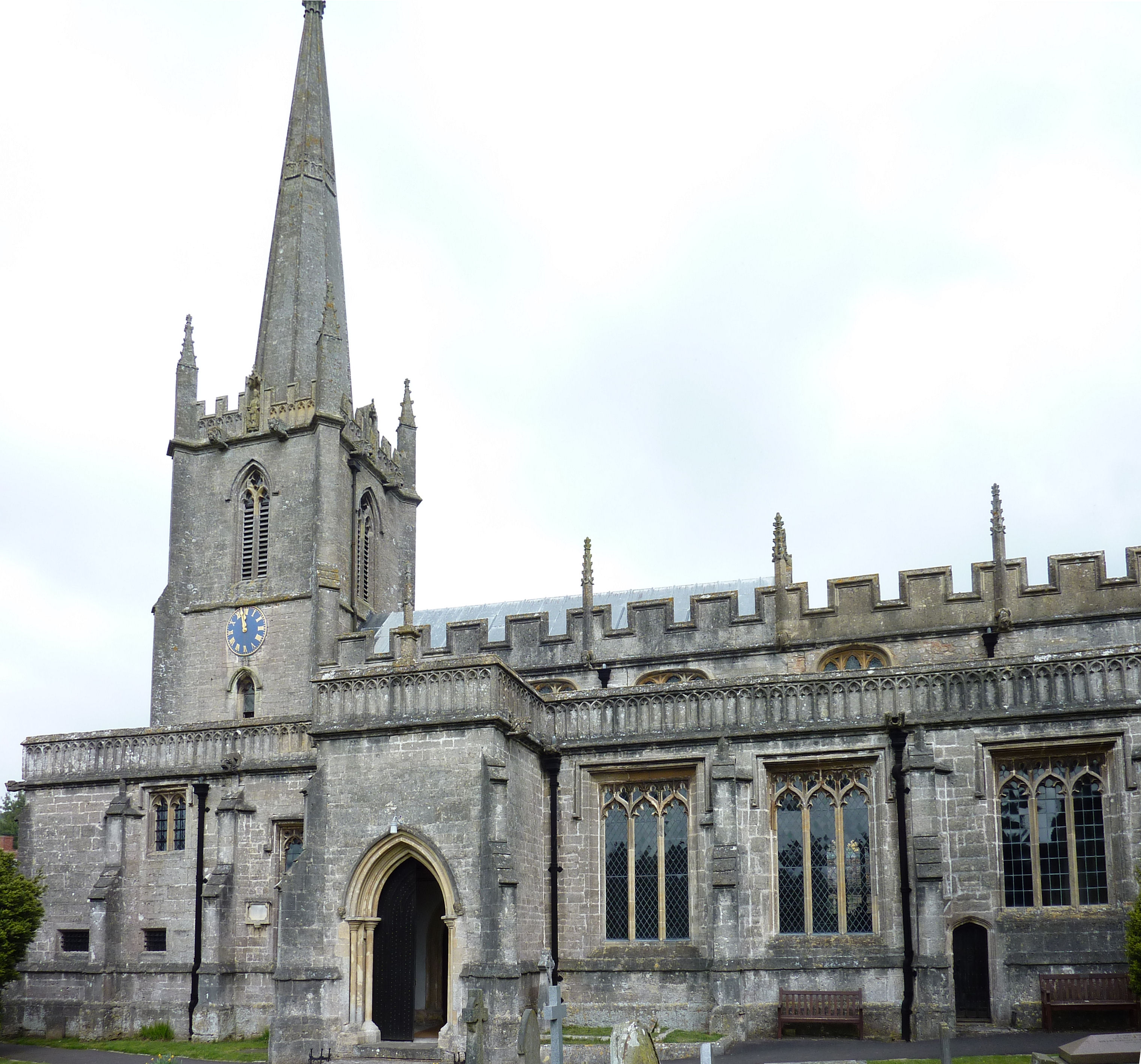
St Mary's Church Croscombe

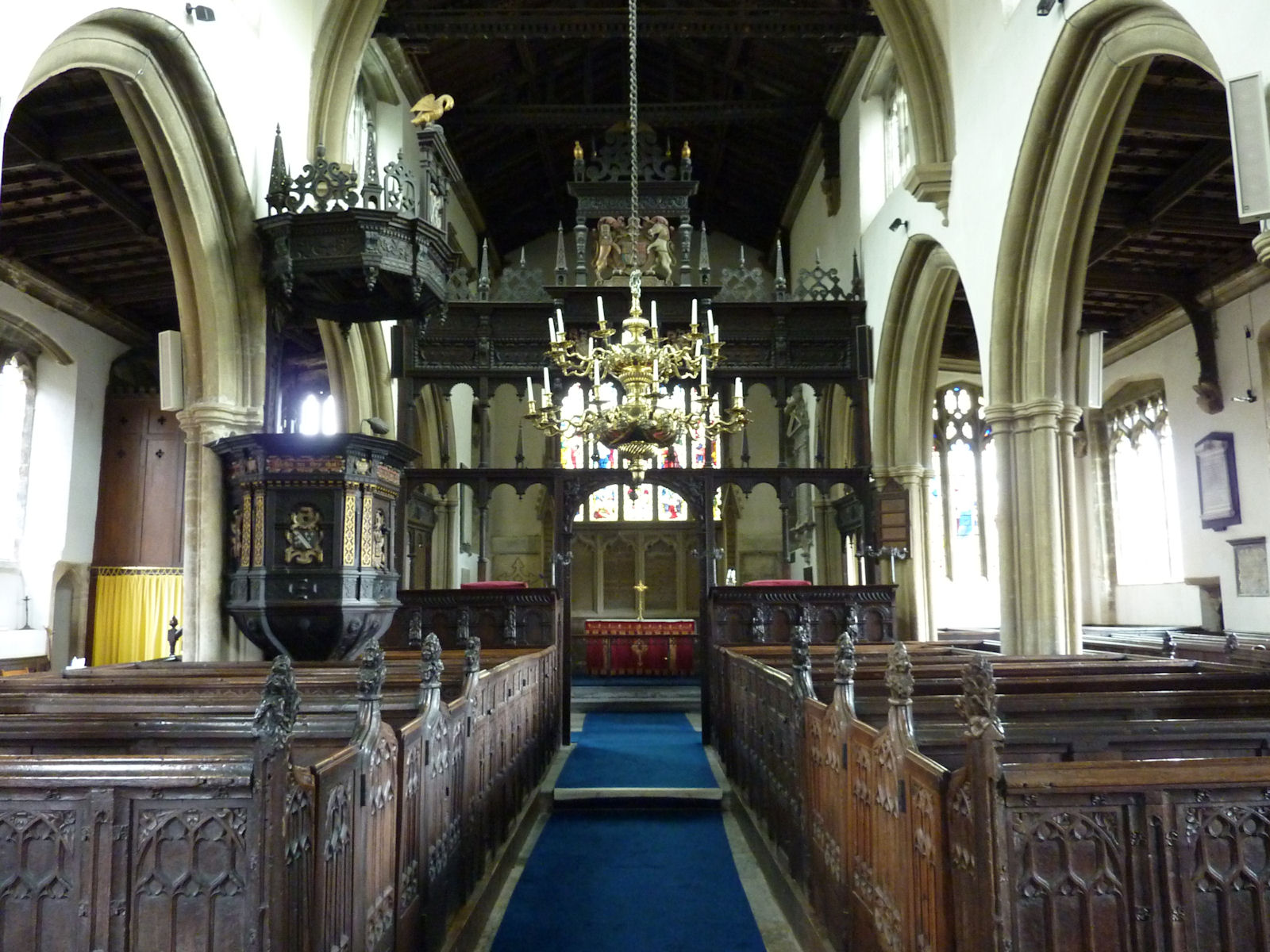
Interior of St Mary's Church

The large Church of St Mary the Virgin is of particular interest, having an unusual spire for Somerset, and Jacobean interior woodwork of national renown. It is primarily from the 15th and 16th centuries with 19th-century restoration. It includes a peal of six bells, the earliest dated 1613, and an organ from 1837. It has been designated by English Heritage as a Grade I listed building.

The Old Rectory (also known as Parsonage House) was built in the 17th century and rebuilt in the 18th. It is a Grade II listed building. In 2014 it was announced by the Church Commissioners that the house would be purchased, for £900,000 as a residence for Peter Hancock the incoming Bishop of Bath and Wells as an alternative to living at the traditional Bishop's Palace in Wells, to provide him with more privacy. This proposition was strongly opposed by the populace and eventually abandoned. The rectory was resold.
