= Mulberry Group =

Fashion company founded in England in 1971

Mulberry Group PLC
- Type: Public
- Traded as: AIM: MUL
- Industry: Fashion
- Founded: 1971; 55 years ago, in Somerset, England
- Founder: Roger Saul
- Headquarters: Somerset, England
- Area served: Worldwide
- Products: Leather goods, accessories
- Owners: Challice Limited (56.4%); Frasers Group (37%)
- Website: mulberry.com

Mulberry Group PLC is a British fashion company founded in 1971, best known for its luxury leather goods, particularly women's handbags.

== History ==
=== Early years ===
The company was founded in 1971 by Roger Saul and his mother, Joan. In 1973, they opened a factory in Chilcompton, Somerset, England. The area was already well-known for leather fabrication, notably by Clarks shoes.

Mulberry established itself as a British lifestyle brand that was noted for its leather poacher bags, including the binocular bag and dispatch bag. The range includes male and female fashions, leather accessories, and footwear. Mulberry Group plc is listed on the London Stock Exchange as MUL, and shareholders with 500 or more shares are entitled to a 20% discount at Mulberry's shops.

In 2000, Saul recruited Scott Henshall as Mulberry's Creative Director. At that time, the company was in the red and Henshall was enlisted to transform the company. He produced jewel items and was responsible for the fashion and accessory collections, as well as Mulberry's rebranding and advertising, where Henshall chose Anna Friel as the face of Mulberry. He placed the brand on major celebrities, including Victoria Beckham, Kate Winslet, Cameron Diaz and Zara Tindall. Henshall departed from Mulberry in 2001 to focus on his own mainline collection.

=== Stuart Vevers, 2005–2007 ===
In 2006, Mulberry launched an apprenticeship programme to encourage local youths to learn production skills, and to provide training and employment for the local community. Apprentices that graduate from the programme are offered a job at the factories in Somerset.

=== Emma Hill, 2008–2013 ===
Emma Hill joined Mulberry in 2007. She is credited with creating items for the company such as the Alexa Chung handbag. Profits for the firm were initially strong after Hill's appointment, however the brand struggled during the credit crisis, and has issued two profit warnings in the past year.

The company reported revenue in 2012 of £168.5 million, and an operating income of £35.4 million, with a net income of £36.0 million.

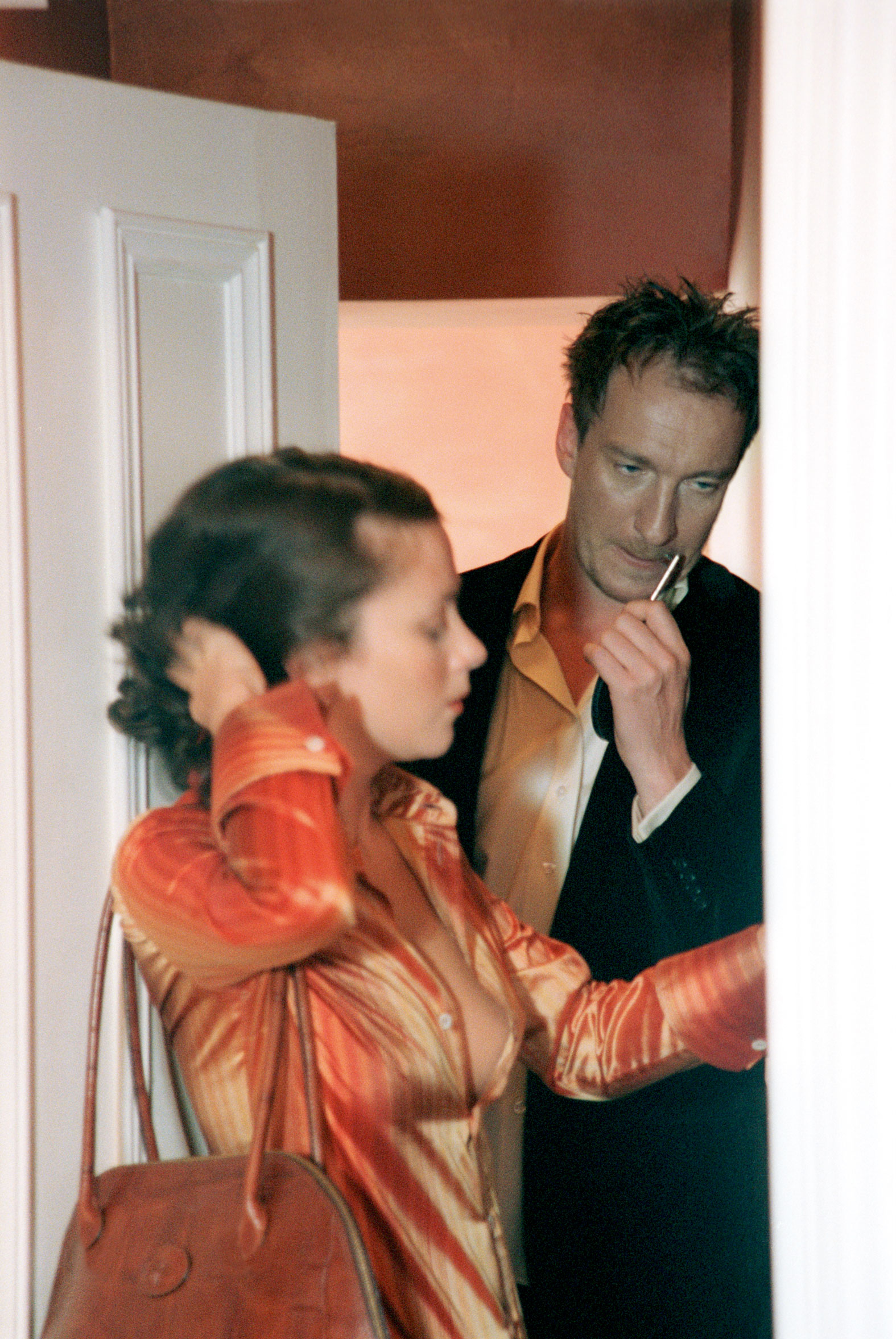
Mulberry A/W 2001, Henry Bond's photo of Anna Friel with David Thewlis. The couple were reported to have been paid £50,000 to appear in the campaign.

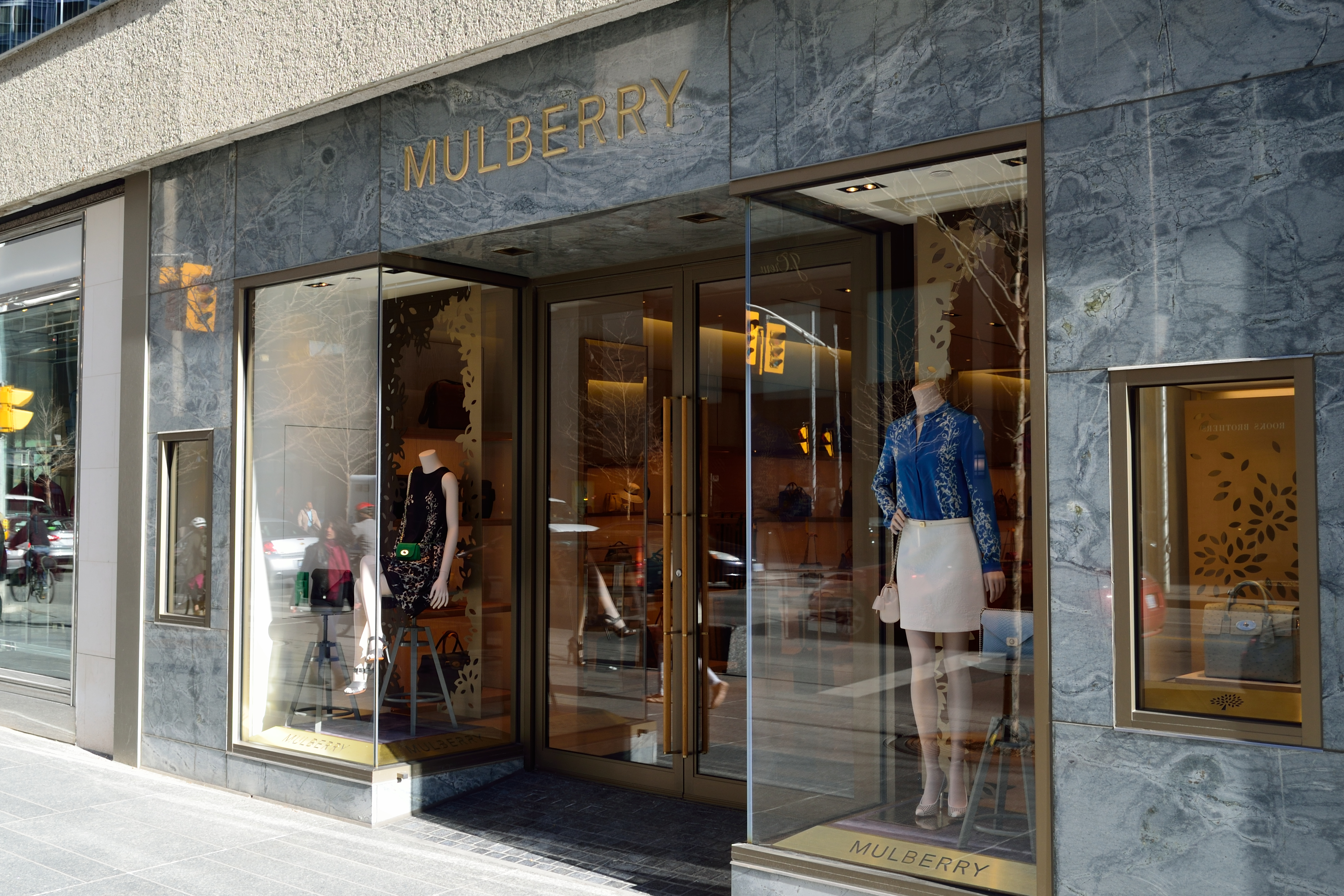
Mulberry in Toronto

In 2013, it was announced that Hill would be leaving the brand due to creative differences. Company share prices fell in the wake of the announcement.

In 2013, Ian Scott, director of a group supply at Mulberry Chilcompton Somerset, was interviewed by Luke Leitch of The Telegraph. He stated that many items (including all men's bags) are made in three Turkish factories also used by brands including Dunhill and Givenchy. The "small leather goods" (such as purses, wallets and phone-holders) are made in China, as is the Mulberry scotch-grain luggage.

During the year 2014, four new directly operated stores were opened in the US and in Germany, one new concession was opened in France and the Stansted Airport store was temporarily closed due to the redevelopment of the terminal. As of 31 March 2015, there were 70 directly operated stores.

For the year ended 31 March 2015, the Mulberry Group announced that the company’s total revenues were 148.7 million pounds (229.5 million dollars), down 9 percent from 163.5 million pounds (252.5 million dollars) in 2013, reflecting a small growth in retail sales which was offset by a decline in wholesale sales.

=== Johnny Coca, 2015–2020 ===
In 2017, Mulberry launched its Mulberry Asia business with Challice, a joint venture partner. Shortly after, Mulberry signed a deal with Onward Global Fashion in Japan to form a joint venture named Mulberry Japan, to be headquartered in Tokyo.

In October 2018, the shareholder discount scheme was changed with the qualifying shareholding increased from the original minimum of 250 shares to a new minimum of 500 shares.

In February 2020, Mike Ashley's Frasers Group bought a 12.5 per cent stake in Mulberry, estimated by The Times at the time to be worth around £19 million. In May 2023 has upped to 37%. In October 2024, Frasers Group made two unsuccessful bids to acquire the company for up to £111 million, but they were rejected by Mulberry's majority investor, Challice, which owns 56.4 per cent of the company.

In 2025, the brand signed new wholesale agreements in the U.K. with key partners, including John Lewis, Liberty and Harvey Nichols.

=== Christopher Kane, 2026–present ===
In 2026, Mulberry appointed Christopher Kane as creative director of its ready-to-wear collection. His debut collection, and Mulberry's first catwalk presentation since 2017, was presented at London Fashion Week on September 20th, 2026.

== Stores and factories ==
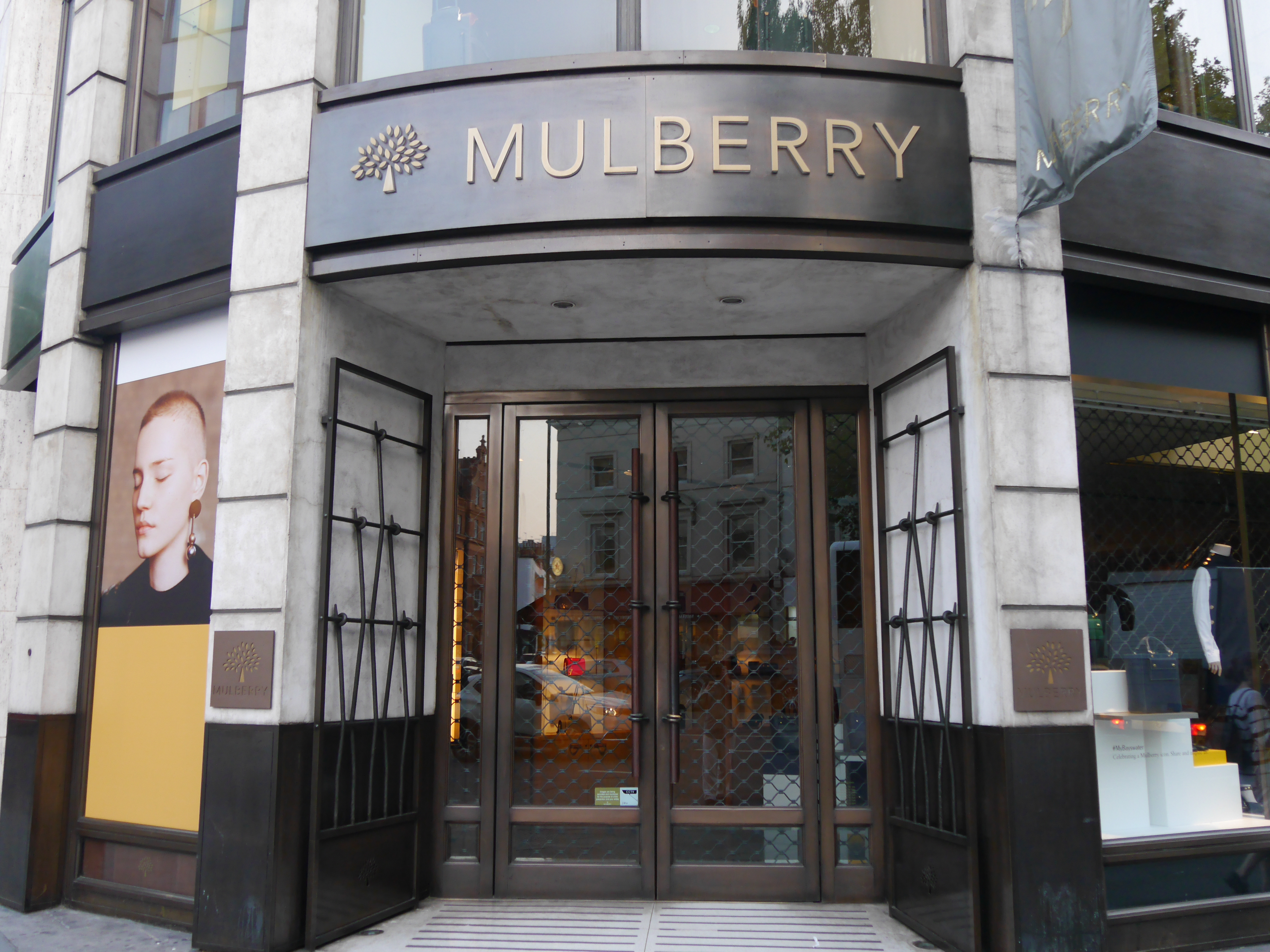
Mulberry store, Brompton Road, London, 2016

Mulberry has stores throughout the UK and all over the world including Europe, the US, Australia and Asia. It has registered offices in Shepton Mallet, London and New York City. Mulberry continues to make designer leather goods at its original Somerset factory, called The Rookery. In summer 2013 Mulberry's second factory, also based in Somerset, started production. It was formally named 'The Willows' in March 2014, after the nearby Willow Man sculpture.
