= Dinder House =

Coordinates: 51°11′58″N 2°36′32″W

Dinder House & Estate
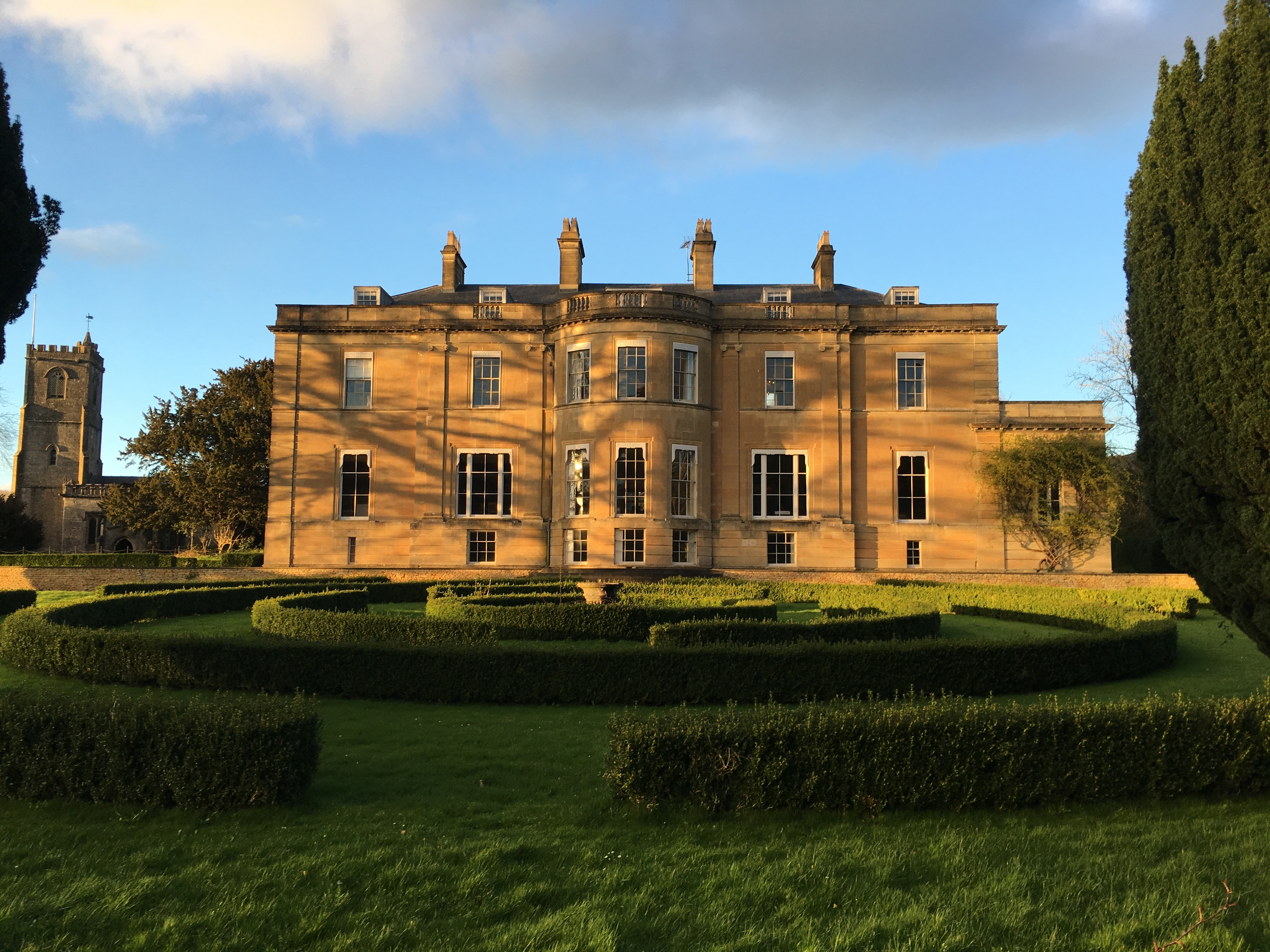
- Dinder House and grounds

General information
- Architectural style: Regency
- Location: Dinder, Somerset, England
- Construction started: 1799
- Completed: 1801
- Renovated: 2003
- Client: Rev William Somerville

Design and construction
- Architect: Nichols of Bath
- Other designers: Ilse Crawford

Dinder House, is a Somerset estate with a small country house Grade II Regency listed building in the village of Dinder, in the civil parish of St Cuthbert Out in Somerset. Dinder House was formerly a manor house dating back to the 12th century, but the existing building was constructed between 1799 and 1801 by the Rev William Somerville on the original site. The estate remained as the seat of the Somerville family until the late twentieth century.

== History ==
The Dinder estate formed part of the early endowment of the Bishopric of Wells. By the 12th Century it has been granted away to William Fitzjohn whose descendants were known as 'Harptree' or 'Fleming' By 1327 the manor was held by Richard de Rodney and his family until sold in the mid 17th Century to Richard Hickes. The Hickes heiress brought it to her husband, George Somerville who died in 1776. His son Rev William Somerville rebuilt the present Dinder House in 1801, on the site of the original manor house, and subsequently died shortly after the completion in 1803. On the death of Rev William Somerville's widow in 1830, the estate passed to his nephew, James Somerville Fownes, who took the surname Somerville to ensure the Somerville name survived.

The Dinder Estate encompassed many properties around the village including Dinder House, Dinder Lodge, The Coach House, The Old Rectory, West House, Gardeners Cottage, Pond Cottage in addition to large tracts of agricultural land and farms.

The last Somerville resident of the house was Admiral of the Fleet Sir James Somerville, who was in command of the British force that sank the French fleet at Mers-el-Kébir, near Oran, Algeria, on 3 July 1940. After World War II, Somerville, who was made Lord Lieutenant of Somerset in August 1946, lived in the house before he died in 1949. He was buried at the Church of St Michael and All Angels Church at Dinder.

The house was completely restored and renovated under the guidance of designer Ilse Crawford and Swiss landscape designer Augusto Calonder. The interior, gardens and grounds have subsequently been featured in many publications .

Dinder House and Estate was sold in March 2017 to private owners.

== Architecture ==
Dinder House is listed as being of architectural and historical importance Grade II and its bridge over the River Sheppey is also listed as a Grade II listed building.

The house is included in Pevsner's Buildings of England as a small country house constructed of ashlar stone with a hipped slate roof and ashlar chimney stacks. The original house was constructed between 1799 and 1801 and Nichols of Bath (William Nichols (architect)) are thought to be the architects. The outer bays were added around 1850 by Vulliamy, and a further single-storey addition to the north dates from 1929.

The house is of a classic Regency style with mellowed ashlar stone elevations and sash windows under a hipped slate roof. The house has a symmetrical front, a full height bow window, ionic pilasters, moulded dentil cornicing, fanlights and parapet wall. The house is linear in plan with bays arranged symmetrically, with the side bays slightly stepped back. The house has three storeys, and serving quarters located on the lower ground floor. The kitchen on the lower ground floor contains the original range and dresser and the former scullery retains the original ovens and washing copper.

Interior features include an oval-shaped vestible with curved panelled doors, a marble fireplace, decorated plaster ceilings and a geometrical stone cantilever staircase, with a mahogany handrail and wrought iron balustrading.

The gate piers, quadrant walls and flanking piers include panelled central piers with pagodal caps, and one with iron lamp at its apex. A bridge over the River Sheppey predates the house.
