= River Sheppey =

River in Somerset, England

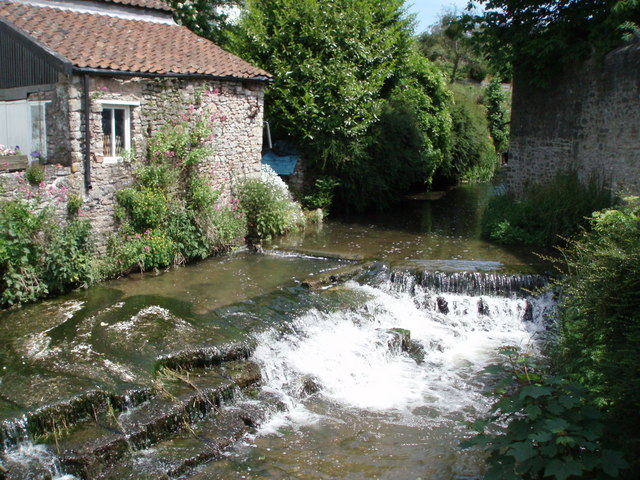
- River Sheppey at Croscombe

Location
- Country: England
- County: Somerset
- City: Shepton Mallet

Physical characteristics
- Source: St Aldhelm's Well
  - location: Doulting, Mendip, Somerset, England
  - coordinates: 51°11′13″N 2°30′31″W
- Mouth: River Brue
  - location: near Westhay, Mendip District, Somerset, England
  - coordinates: 51°10′44″N 2°47′41″W

The River Sheppey has its source in a group of springs west of the village of Doulting, near Shepton Mallet in Somerset, England. It flows through the wetlands to the north of the Polden Hills and ultimately joins the River Brue.

== Route ==
From Doulting, the Sheppey flows south west to Charlton, where parts of its course have been culverted. The river has been diverted underground for much, though not all, of its passage through Shepton Mallet. It reappears at Darshill and then flows south west through Croscombe to Dinder where it flows through the grounds of Dinder House which was built in 1801 and under a bridge which pre-dates the house. It then continues west past Dulcote, Woodford and Coxley. At Coxley it is joined by the Keward Brook which carries the water from the springs in Wells which fill the moat of the Bishop's Palace.

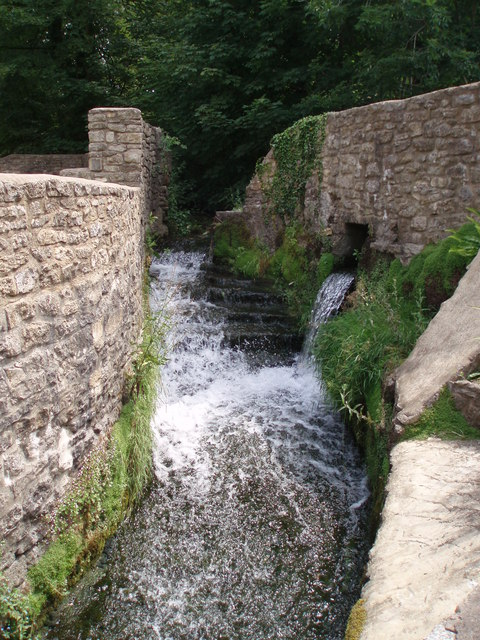
River Sheppey at Darshill

From Coxley, the river flows north through Hay Moor and North Moor, west through Ash Moor, then sharply south through Frogmore and west through Godney.

At Lower Godney (where this is a public house named after the river), it is channelled through the James Wear River and the Decoy Rhine to Westhay Level, where it joins Whites River and then the River Brue near Westhay.

== Ecology ==
The water quality is generally good; however, there have been some discharges from sewage treatment works in the area that can contribute to nutrient levels in rivers. Signs of nutrient enrichment are noticeable at times of low flow and the ecology of the Sheppey is adversely affected in its upper reaches.

== History ==
It would appear that the Sheppey was only so called in the late 19th century. Prior to this, it may have been named Doulting Water or the River Brae.

The Sheppey has been used in the past to power local industry, for example corn and textile mills in the Shepton Mallet area. There may have been more than thirty mills powered by the river and its tributaries in the area of Shepton Mallet, Bowlish and Darshill, although fewer than this number of sites have been positively identified.
