= North Wootton, Somerset =

Village and civil parish in Somerset, England

Coordinates: 51.1710°N 2.6215°W

North Wootton
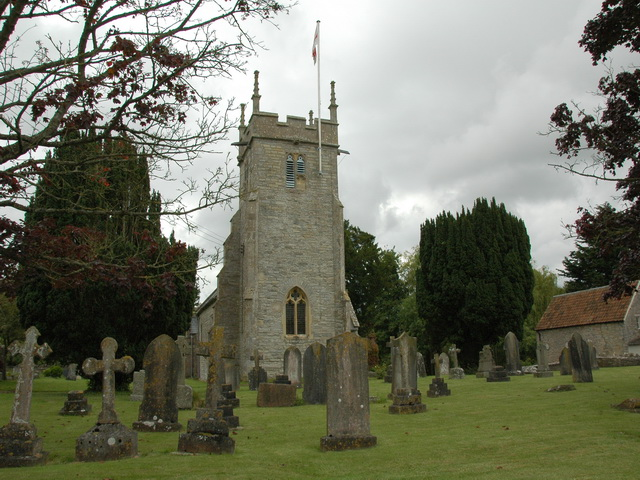
- St Peters Church

- Location within Somerset
- Population: 317 (2011)
- OS grid reference: ST565415
- Unitary authority: Somerset Council
- Ceremonial county: Somerset
- Region: South West
- Country: England
- Sovereign state: United Kingdom
- Post town: SHEPTON MALLET
- Postcode district: BA4
- Dialling code: 01749
- Police: Avon and Somerset
- Fire: Devon and Somerset
- Ambulance: South Western
- UK Parliament: Wells and Mendip Hills

North Wootton is a village and civil parish, on the River Redlake, 2.5 miles (4.0 km) south east of Wells, and 3.5 miles (5.6 km) south west of Shepton Mallet in the county of Somerset, England.

The village is on the Monarch's Way long-distance footpath.

== History ==
The name Wootton means the settlement in or by a wood. The North being added in the 20th century to distinguish it from Wootton Courtenay.

The estate was granted by King Edmund to Aethelnoth, his minister in 946, and then to Glastonbury Abbey.

The parish was part of the hundred of Glaston Twelve Hides.

== Governance ==
The parish council has responsibility for local issues, including setting an annual precept (local rate) to cover the council's operating costs and producing annual accounts for public scrutiny. The parish council evaluates local planning applications and works with the local police, district council officers, and neighbourhood watch groups on matters of crime, security, and traffic. The parish council's role also includes initiating projects for the maintenance and repair of parish facilities, as well as consulting with the district council on the maintenance, repair, and improvement of highways, drainage, footpaths, public transport, and street cleaning. Conservation matters (including trees and listed buildings) and environmental issues are also the responsibility of the council.

For local government purposes, since 1 April 2023, the parish comes under the unitary authority of Somerset Council. Prior to this, it was part of the non-metropolitan district of Mendip (established under the Local Government Act 1972). It was part of Wells Rural District before 1974.

It is also part of the Wells and Mendip Hills county constituency represented in the House of Commons of the Parliament of the United Kingdom. It elects one Member of Parliament (MP) by the first past the post system of election.

== Commerce ==
Despite its small size, the village of North Wootton is home to several businesses, including the popular campsite Greenacres Camping, and Honey Tree Publishing Ltd.

== Religious sites ==
The Church of St Peter dates from the 14th century and is a Grade II* listed building.
